= BIW Technologies =

Software company in United Kingdom

BIW Technologies Limited
- Type: Private
- Industry: Computer software
- Founded: 2000; 26 years ago London, England
- Headquarters: Woking, Surrey
- Area served: United Kingdom; Vadodara, Gujarat, India; Dubai
- Key people: Colin Smith, CEO
- Products: BIW; BIW viewer
- Revenue: £5.9m (2009)
- Number of employees: 47
- Website: www.biwtech.com

BIW Technologies (BIW) was a privately held British company providing web-based electronic construction collaboration technologies (also sometimes described as project management or project extranet systems), to customers in the construction and property sectors. It was acquired by a German company, Conject, in December 2010, and adopted its parent company's branding in April 2012. In March 2016, the Conject group was acquired by Australia-based rival, Aconex, which, in December 2017, was acquired by Oracle Corporation.

== History ==
Having purchased the rights to a prototype Software-as-a-Service (SaaS) application already being piloted by Sainsbury's and BAA, CEO Colin Smith and his fellow founder directors established the company in London in early 2000 as interest in construction-oriented dot.com businesses began to peak in the UK. Working with such 'blue chip' clients helped BIW market the platform to both existing project supply chains and to new customers, and the business grew rapidly.

By 2003, according to independent research by Compagnia, BIW could claim 26.4% of the UK market, and it was achieving annual revenues of £2.7m, comfortably ahead of its then nearest UK rival, BuildOnline. For a period 2001–2004, BIW also provided its software to Asite which traded as a reseller of BIW's platform until it launched its own collaboration system and became a direct competitor.

In 2003, BIW was a founder member of the Network of Construction Collaboration Technology Providers (NCCTP), then managed by CIRIA and later part of Constructing Excellence. From 2000–2005, Sir Michael Latham, author of the influential Latham Report, served as non-executive Deputy Chairman of BIW.

In January 2005, the company relocated its head office from London to Woking in Surrey. It has maintained a UK software development centre in Nottingham since 2000, and established an offshore software development centre in Vadodara, Gujarat, India in October 2007.

It opened a Middle East office in Dubai in 2006. In 2008, it formed a partnership with Sage to deliver its collaboration solutions to clients in North America.

In April 2006, BIW Technologies won the 'Entrepreneur of the Year' category in the industry's annual Building Awards, being described as a "firm that seems intent on wiping paper use out of the industry altogether".

BIW's customers included Robertson, Sainsbury's, BAA, Argent Group plc, Mace, Bovis Lend Lease, Land Securities, Defence Estates, Interserve and Marks & Spencer. By 2010, it claimed its software was used by over 190,000 registered users in over 14,000 organisations.

== Finances ==
BIW remained independent of construction industry investors, with most of its initial funding coming from private investors, who held shares in a holding company, BIW plc.

According to Companies House submissions, BIW Technologies Ltd achieved revenues of £7.3m in the year to 30 September 2008, generating a profit of £1.1m. At this time, the company was reported to be planning a £25m to £40m listing on London's AIM. However, the company suffered during the Great Recession, partly due to its exposure to the Dubai market, with revenues cut to £5.9m and BIW declaring a pre-tax loss of £731,000.

The company recapitalised in September 2009, with BIW plc being put into administration, a process that rendered the company debt-free.

== Acquisition and merger ==
In December 2010 BIW Technologies was acquired by German-based Conject Holdings GmbH in a deal to unite providers of ILM software applications for the engineering, construction and real estate industries. BIW and Conject AG formed a new group offering applications to support asset-based projects throughout their infrastructure lifecycle: from concept, design and construction through to facilities management. With offices in nine countries, the group had combined revenues of around €18 million, with 180 employees and approximately 170,000 active users.

In March 2016, the Conject group was acquired by Australia-based rival, Aconex. In December 2017, Aconex was acquired by Oracle Corporation.
