= Saturn's Children =

Saturn's Children may refer to:

- the children of Saturn (mythology) in Roman myth; Saturn, fearing his children usurping him, ate them at birth
- Saturn's Children (Duncan and Hobson book), a 1995 political science book by Alan Duncan and Dominic Hobson
- Saturn's Children (novel), a 2008 science fiction novel by Charlie Stross

== See also ==
- Saturn Devouring His Son, a painting by Francisco Goya
