= Construction engineering =

Subdiscipline of civil engineering focused on construction and operations

Construction engineering, also known as construction operations, is a professional sub-discipline of civil engineering that deals with the designing, planning, construction, and operations management of infrastructure such as roadways, tunnels, bridges, airports, railroads, facilities, buildings, dams, utilities and other projects. Construction engineers learn design and project management techniques that are similar to those used by civil engineers.

At the educational level, civil engineering students concentrate primarily on more analytical design, gearing them toward a career as a design professional. This requires them to take engineering science and design courses as part of obtaining a 4-year accredited degree. Education for construction engineers is primarily focused on construction procedures, methods, costs, schedules and personnel management. Their primary concern is to deliver a project on time within budget and of the desired quality.

Regarding educational requirements, construction engineering students take basic design courses in civil engineering, as well as construction management courses.

== Work activities ==
Being a sub-discipline of civil engineering, construction engineers apply their knowledge of business, technical and management skills to oversee projects including bridges, buildings and housing projects. Construction engineers are heavily involved in the design and management of project funds. They are in charge of risk analysis, costing and planning. A career in design requires a professional engineer license (PE). Individuals who pursue this career path are advised to sit for the Engineer in Training exam (EIT), also referred to as the Fundamentals of Engineering Exam (FE), while in college, as it takes five years' (4 years in USA) post-graduate to obtain the PE license. Some states have recently changed the PE license exam pre-requisite of 4 years work experience after graduation to become a licensed Professional Engineer where an EIT is eligible to take the PE Exam in as little as 6 months after taking the FE exam.

Entry-level construction engineers position is typically project engineers or assistant project engineers. They are responsible for preparing purchasing requisitions, processing change orders, preparing monthly budgeting reports and handling meeting minutes. The construction management position does not necessarily require a PE license; however, possessing one does make the individual more marketable, as the PE license allows the individual to sign off on temporary structure designs.

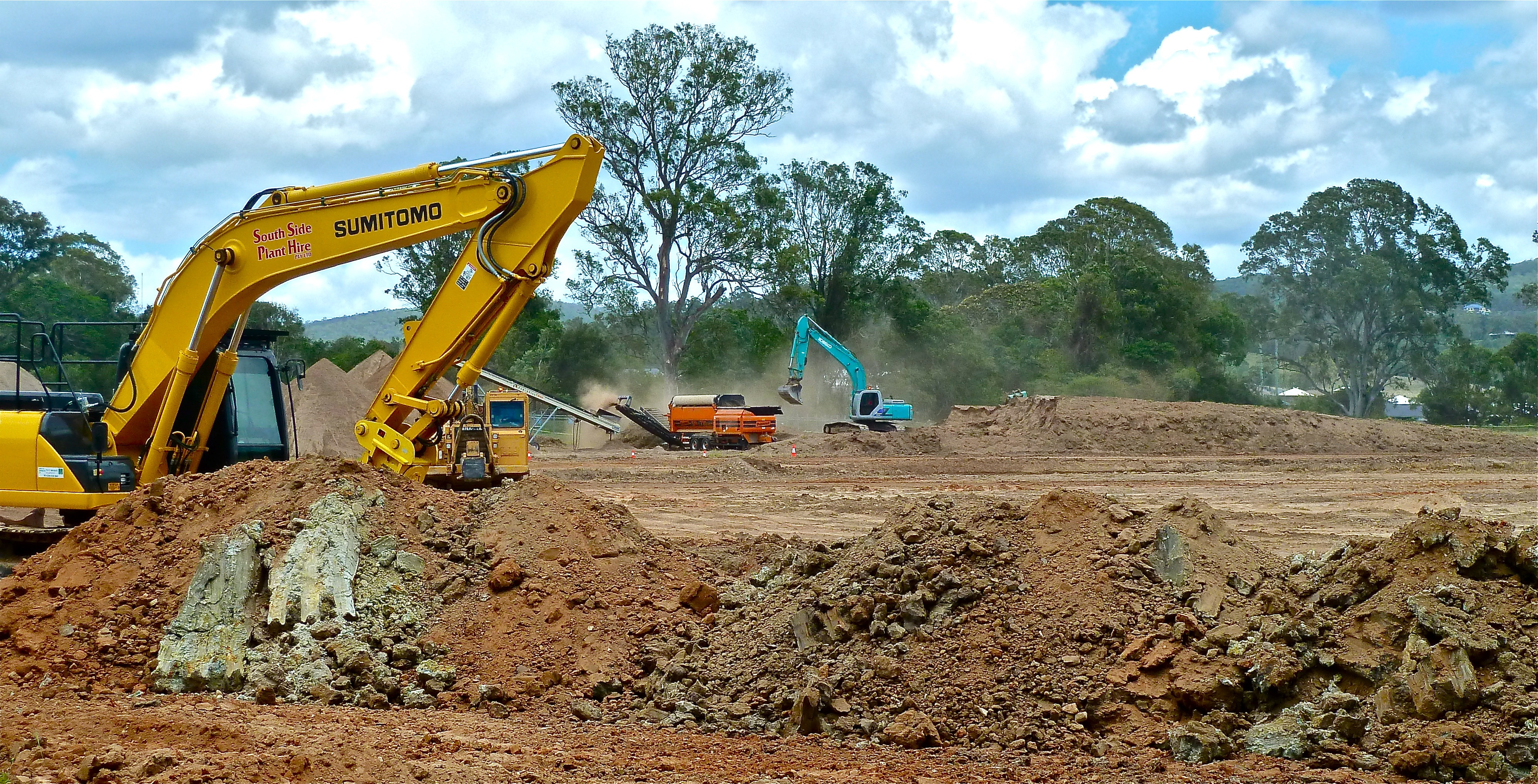
A construction project

== Abilities ==
Construction engineers contribute to the creation of infrastructure that meets the unique demands of its environment. They must be able to understand infrastructure life cycles.

== Educational requirements ==
Individuals looking to obtain a construction engineering degree must first ensure that the program is accredited by the Accreditation Board for Engineering and Technology (ABET). ABET accreditation is assurance that a college or university program meets the quality standards established by the profession for which it prepares its students. There are 4,863 ABET accredited institutions worldwide..

A typical construction engineering curriculum is a mixture of engineering mechanics, engineering design, construction management and general science and mathematics. This usually leads to a Bachelor of Science degree. The B.S. degree along with some design or construction experience is sufficient for most entry-level positions. Graduate schools may be an option for those who want to go further in depth of the construction and engineering subjects taught at the undergraduate level. In most cases construction engineering graduates look to either civil engineering, engineering management or business administration as a possible graduate degree.

== Job prospects ==
Job prospects for construction engineers generally have a strong cyclical variation. For example, starting in 2008 and continuing until at least 2011, job prospects have been poor due to the collapse of housing bubbles in many parts of the world. This sharply reduced demand for construction, forced construction professionals towards infrastructure construction and therefore increased the competition faced by established and new construction engineers. This increased competition and a core reduction in quantity demand is in parallel with a possible shift in the demand for construction engineers due to the automation of many engineering tasks, overall resulting in reduced prospects for construction engineers. In early 2010, the United States construction industry had a 27% unemployment rate, this is nearly three times higher than the 9.7% national average unemployment rate. The construction unemployment rate (including tradesmen) is comparable to the United States 1933 unemployment rate—the lowest point of the Great Depression—of 25%.

== Remuneration ==
The average salary for a civil engineer in the UK depends on the sector and more specifically the level of experience of the individual. A 2010 survey of the remuneration and benefits of those occupying jobs in construction and the built environment industry showed that the average salary of a civil engineer in the UK is £29,582. In the United States, as of May 2013, the average was $85,640. The average salary varies depending on experience, for example the average annual salary for a civil engineer with between 3 and 6 years' experience is £23,813. For those with between 14 and 20 years' experience the average is £38,214.

== See also ==
- Architectural engineering
- Building officials
- Civil engineering
- Constructability
- Construction communication
- Construction estimating software
- Construction law
- Construction management
- Cost engineering
- Cost overrun
- Earthquake engineering
- Engineering, procurement and construction (EPC)
- Engineering, procurement, construction and installation, (EPCI)
- Index of construction articles
- International Building Code
- List of BIM software
- Military engineering
- Quantity surveyor
- Structural engineering
- Work breakdown structure
