= Construction communication =

Construction communication, within an organizational context, is to convey an instruction to influence the actions/behaviors of others, or may involve an exchange of, or request for information during a construction project.

== Background ==
Communication usually involves the transfer of information, a generic term that embraces meaning such as knowledge, processed data, skills and technology.

Communication within project-based environments presents special challenges. This is especially true within the construction industry, where interaction tends to be characterised by unfamiliar groups of people coming together for short periods before disbanding to work on other endeavours.

== Importance ==
Per M.E.L. Hoezen, the author of The problem of communication in construction.

The efficiency and effectiveness of the construction process strongly depend on the quality of

communication. In literature four reasons are mentioned why improvements in communication are

needed. The first reason is that an improvement in the communication within the building team, in project teams and between project manager and contractors, could reduce failure. Second, more open communication at all levels could lead to innovations and better technical solutions. Third, communication improvements in early phases of projects would positively influence the quality as perceived by all stakeholders involved. Finally, improved communication during the briefing might lead to better decision making, for example less haste in moving to solutions and better ways of looking at the requirements first.

Communication is essential to all business activities; it enables an organization, and is an integral part of the construction process. Beyond the argument, any improvement in communication can improve an organization's operating effectiveness. Good communication within an organization and between organizations contributing to the construction project can improve motivation levels and improve the processes. Conversely, inadequate communication can result in a demotivated workforce and lead to problems in construction.

Construction projects are complex and risky, requiring the active participation of all contributors. Co-operation and co-ordination of activities through interpersonal and group communication are essential in ensuring the project is completed successfully. Poor communication, lack of consultation and inadequate feedback are to be found as the root cause of defects in many constructed works. Poor co-ordination and communication of design information lead to design problems that cause design errors. Communication is the one aspect of the management of projects that pervades all others.

Given that construction is such a fragmented, dynamic and disparate sector, the challenges of communicating effectively are greater than in most other production environments. Contractually driven relationships, conflict and a lack of mutual respect and trust, all combine to hinder open communication and render the role of the project manager extremely demanding and problematic. Nevertheless, addressing communication in the industry can be seen as a principal enabler for improving the industry in the future.

== Issues ==
Since the early 1940s, literature on communication in construction has appeared, mainly based on the situation in the UK.

Many problems concerning communication have been reported, with a focus on intra-supplier communication within the construction sector; demand-supply communication during the design phase; and communication between and within single demand and supply side parties, during whole the construction process.

With the globalization of the construction industry, emerging issues in construction communication in international contexts, such as problem-solving in international projects, have started to receive more attention.

== See also ==
- Construction collaboration technology
- Extranet
- List of collaborative software
