= Feminization of poverty =

Poverty phenomena that most frequently affect women

Feminization of poverty refers to a trend of increasing inequality in living standards between men and women due to the widening gender gap in poverty. This phenomenon largely links to how women and children are disproportionately represented within the lower socioeconomic status community in comparison to men within the same socioeconomic status. Causes of the feminization of poverty include the structure of family and household, employment, sexual violence, education, climate change, "femonomics" and health. The traditional stereotypes of women remain embedded in many cultures restricting income opportunities and community involvement for many women. Matched with a low foundation income, this can manifest to a cycle of poverty and thus an inter-generational issue.

Entrepreneurship is usually perceived as the cure-all solution for deprivation depletion. Advocates assert that it guides to job design, higher earnings, and lower deprivation prices in the towns within it happens. Others disagree that numerous entrepreneurs are generating low-capacity companies helping regional markets.

This term was originated in the U.S. towards the end of the twentieth century and maintains prominence as a contested international phenomenon. Some researchers describe these issues as prominent in some countries of Asia, Africa and areas of Europe. Women in these countries are typically deprived of income, employment opportunities and physical and emotional help putting them at the highest risk of poverty. This phenomenon also differs between religious groups, dependent on the focus put on gender roles and how closely their respective religious texts are followed.

Feminisation of poverty is primarily measured using three international indexes. These indexes are the Gender Development Index, the Gender Empowerment Measure and the Human Poverty Index. These indexes focus on issues other than monetary or financial issues. These indexes focus on gender inequalities and the standard of living, and highlight the difference between human poverty and income poverty.

== History ==
The concept of the 'feminization of poverty' dates back to the 1970s and became popular in the 1990s through some United Nations documents. It became a prominent in popular society after a study focusing on gender patterns in the evolution of poverty rates in the United States was released.

The feminization of poverty is a relative concept based on a women-men comparison. For instance, feminization of poverty exists if poverty in a society is distinctly reduced among men and is only slightly reduced among women. For example, in the United States during the year of 2016, 14.0% of women and 11.3% of men were below the poverty threshold.

== Definitions ==
The feminization of poverty is a contested idea with a multitude of meanings and layers. The International Poverty Centre defines feminization of poverty in two parts: feminization, and poverty. Feminization designates gendered change; something becoming more feminine, by extension more familiar or severe among women or female-headed households. Poverty is a deficit of resources or abilities. The International Poverty Centre likewise depicts the escalating role that gender discrimination has in determining poverty. For instance, an increase of wage discrimination between males and females can also exacerbate poverty among women and men of all types of families. This phenomenon highlights the relationship between poverty and sexism against women.

The concept also served to illustrate the many social and economic factors contributing to women's poverty.

The term originates in the U.S., which has a higher level of female poverty than other wealthy countries. The proportion of female-headed households whose incomes fall below the "poverty line" has been broadly adopted as a measure of women's poverty. In many countries, household consumption and expenditure surveys show a high incidence of female-headed households among the "poor," defined as those whose incomes fall below the poverty line.

There are two assumptions underlying income-based measures of poverty according to researcher Sharon Bessell. First, there is that tendency to equate income with the ability to control income. While women may control earned income, the limits on poor women's financial sovereignty have been well demonstrated. An income-based measure may hide the extent and nature of poverty when women earn an income but have no control over those earnings, claims Bessel. While the question of who controls income is a delicate matter for women, it is also relevant to the position and well-being of men. Societies that place upon individuals a heavy communal, kinship or clan-based obligation may end in both women and men having limited control over their individual incomes. Second is the assumption that income creates equal access and generates equal benefits. Access to education illustrates the point. While lack of financial resources may result in low enrollment or high drop-out rates among poor children, social values around the role of women and the importance of formal education for girls are likely to be more meaningful in demonstrating the difference between male and female enrollment rates.

== Causes ==
Factors that place women at high risk of poverty include change of family structure, gender wage gaps and women's prevalence in low-paid occupations, a lack of work-family supports, and the challenges involved in accessing public benefits. Feminization of poverty is more severe in developing countries.

Although low income is the major cause, there are many interrelated facets of this problem. Single mothers are usually at the highest risk for extreme poverty because their income is often insufficient to rear children. The image of a "traditional" woman and a traditional role still influences many cultures in today's world and is still not in full realization that women are essential part of the economy. In addition, income poverty lowers their children's possibilities for good education and nourishment. Low income is a consequence of the social bias women face in trying to obtain formal employment, which in turn deepens the cycle of poverty. Beyond income, poverty manifests in other dimensions such as time poverty and capability deprivations. Poverty is multidimensional, and therefore economic, demographic, and socio-cultural factors all overlap and contribute to the establishment of poverty. It is a phenomenon with multiple root causes and manifestations.

=== Single mother households ===
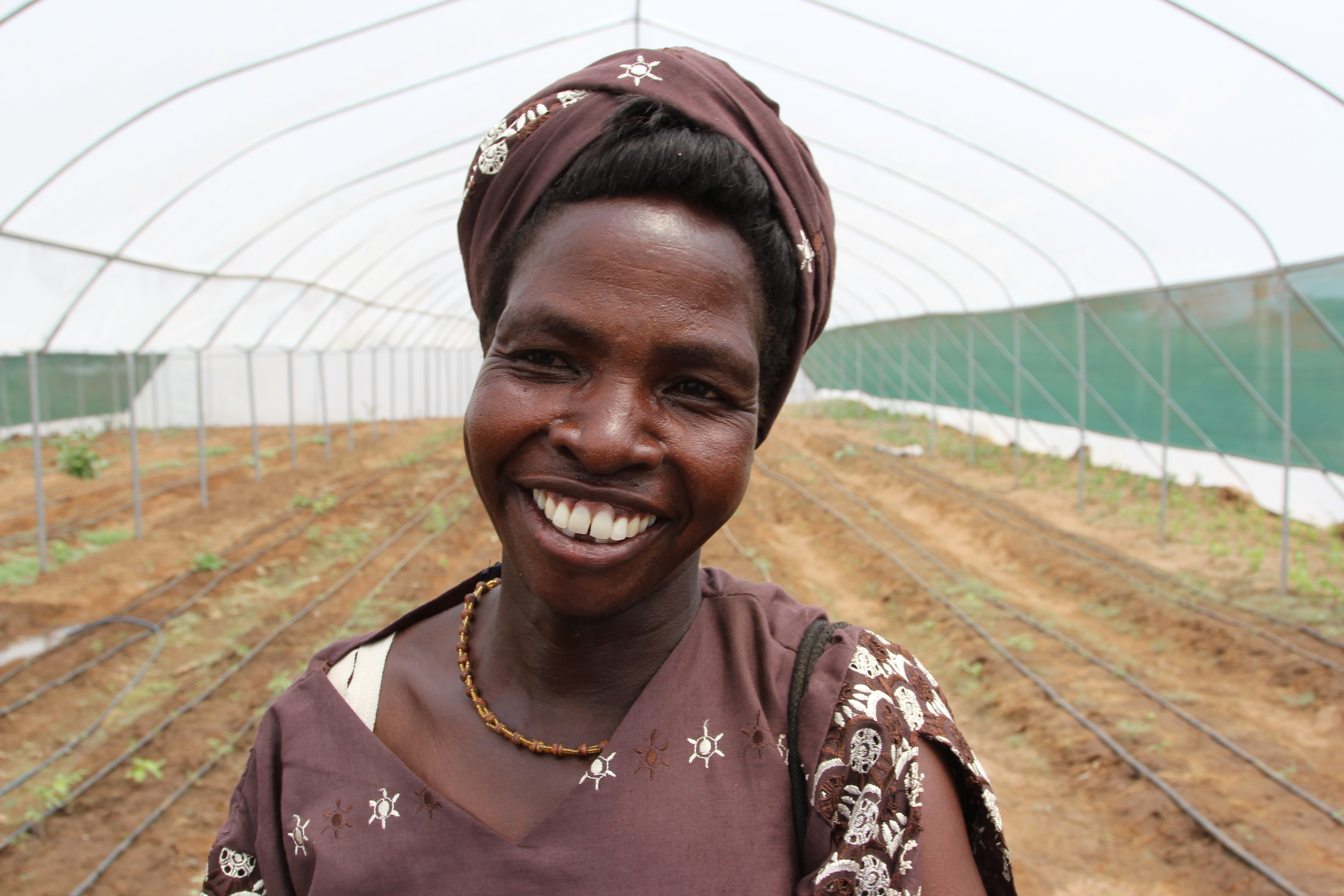
Mothers often experience poverty more extremely because they have more demands on time, energy and resources. This woman farmer in Northern Kenya is part of a mother support group that creates peer support across 13 mothers, to learn about parenting and economic practices.

Single mother households are critical in addressing feminization of poverty and can be broadly defined as households in which there are female headships and no male headships. Single mother households are at the highest risk of poverty for women due to lack of income and resources. There is a continuing increase of single mother households in the world, which results in higher percentages of women in poverty. Single mothers are the poorest women in society, and their children tend to be disadvantaged in comparison to their peers.

Different factors can be taken into account for the rise in the number of female headship in households. While never-married heads of household are also at economic risk, changes of family structure, particularly divorce, are the major cause of initial spells of poverty among female-headed households. When men become migrant workers, women are left to be the main caretaker of their homes. Those women who have the opportunity to work usually don't get better jobs. They are left with jobs that don't offer financial sustainability or benefits. Other factors such as illnesses and deaths of husbands lead to an increase in single mother households in developing countries.

Female headed households are most susceptible to poverty because they have fewer income earners to provide financial support within the household. According to a case study in Zimbabwe, households headed by widows have an income of approximately half that of male-headed households, and de facto female headed households have about three-quarters of the income of male headed households. Additionally, single mother households lack critical resources in life, which worsens their state of poverty. They do not have access to the opportunities to attain a decent standard of living along with basic needs such as health and education. Single mother households relate to gender inequality issues as women are more susceptible to poverty and lack essential life needs in comparison to men.

Many factors contribute to becoming impoverished. Some of these factors are more prevalent in the lives of single mothers. When demographic attributes of single mothers are surveyed, a few factors showed up in higher rates. Marital status (divorced or widowed), education, and race correlated strongly with levels of poverty for single mothers. Specifically, very few mothers on the poverty line had a college degree and were having to "work to make ends meet". The likelihood of getting a full-time job decreases with certain factors. When these certain factors were surveyed in single moms they occurred at higher rates: co-inhabiting, lack of education, and use of welfare. All of these factors are ones that the researchers, Brian Brown and Daniel Lichter, identified as contributing to single mothers' poverty.

==== Effects on mental health ====
Parenting in poverty-ridden conditions can cause emotional instability for a child and their relationship with a single mother.

Not only do demographic attributes affect parenting in poverty, emotional attributes provided an instability as well when viewed by Dr. Bloom. Mothers have been noted as the "caregivers" or "nurturer" of families. Some stereotypical things that are expected of mothers are harder to provide in a low-income household when a mother is the main provider. Dr. Bloom's example of a stereotypical mother job in Western Societies was bringing treats to school on birthdays and expected to go to parent teacher conferences.

A researcher, Denise Zabkiewicz, surveyed single mothers in poverty and measured rates of depression over time. Since recent studies in 2010 had brought the idea that work was beneficial for mental health, Zabkiewicz thought to research if jobs were mentally beneficial to poverty line single mothers. Those results concluded to be true; mothers' rates of depression were significantly lower when one held a stable, long-term job.

=== Employment ===
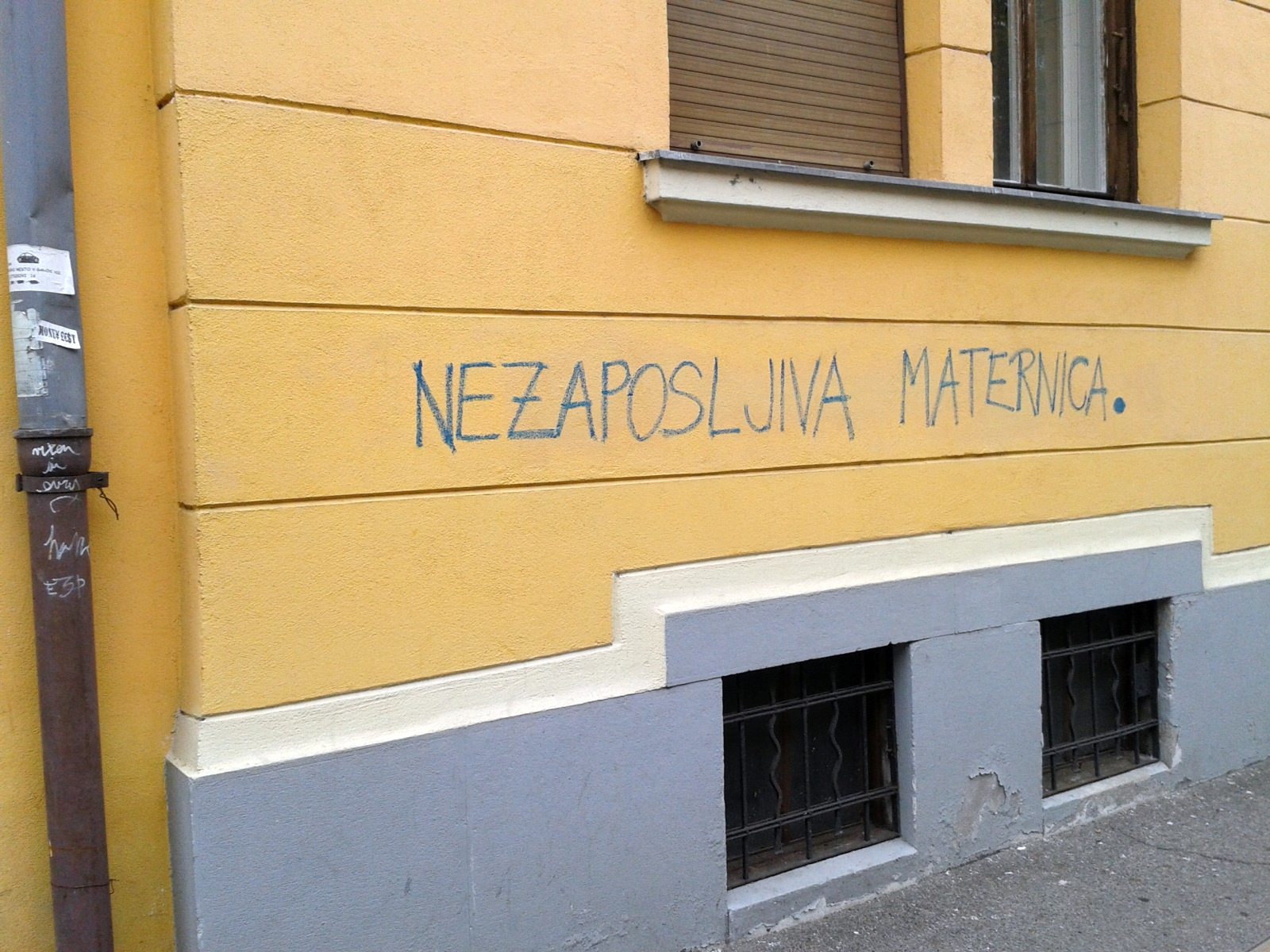
"Unemployable uterus", a graffito in Ljubljana, Slovenia

Employment opportunities are limited for women worldwide. The ability to materially control one's environment by gaining equal access to work that is humanizing and allows for meaningful relationships with other workers is an essential capability. Employment impacts go beyond financial independence. Employment establishes higher security and real world experience which elevates regard within families settings and increases bargaining positions for women. Though there has been major growth in women's employment, the quality of the jobs still remains deeply unequal in both poor and rich countries. Teenage motherhood is a factor that corresponds to poverty.

There are two kinds of employment: formal and informal. Formal employment is government regulated and workers are insured a wage and certain rights. Informal employment takes place in small, unregistered enterprises. It is generally a large source of employment for women. The burden of informal care work falls predominantly on women, who work longer and harder in this role than men. This affects their ability to hold other jobs and change positions, the hours they can work, and their decision to give up work. However, women who have University degrees or other forms of higher learning tend to stay in their jobs even with caring responsibilities, which suggests that the human capital from this experience causes women to feel opportunity costs when they lose their employment. Having children has also historically affected women's choice to stay employed.

=== Sexual violence ===
A form of sexual violence on the rise in the United States is human trafficking. Poverty can lead to increased trafficking due to more people on the streets. Women who are impoverished, foreign, socially deprived, or at other disadvantages are more susceptible to being recruited into trafficking. Many laws stated in Kelsey Tumiel's dissertation, have recently been made to try to combat the phenomenon, but it is predicted that human trafficking will surpass illegal drug trafficking amounts in the US. Women that are victims of sexual human trafficking acts have a difficult time escaping the life due to abuse of power, organized crime, and insufficient laws to protect them. There are more people current enslaved in trafficking than there were during the African slave trade. "Branding" of human trafficking brings awareness to the issue, which allows for public assertion and intervention. Reducing poverty may thus lead to a decrease in trafficking from the streets.

=== Education ===
Women and girls have limited access to basic education in developing countries. This is due to strong gender discrimination and social hierarchies in these countries. Approximately one quarter of girls in the developing world do not attend school. This impedes a woman's ability to make informed choices and achieve goals. Enabling female education leads to the reduction of household poverty. Higher education is a major key to reducing women's poverty.

The limited number of girls who are enrolled in education in developing countries have a higher drop out rate than boys. This is caused by the high rape and sexual assault rates by teachers, which can lead to an unwanted pregnancy, and male prioritization of education. Males will be receiving an education while females are learning domestic skills, including cleaning, cooking and looking after children. Sexual harassment by both students and teachers is common in universities in Africa.

Paradoxically, the enrollment rates of women in universities worldwide have risen to a greater amount than men. A research survey asked Americans without degrees of both genders why did they not pursue one. Men were more likely to answer that they did not want one, while women were more likely to answer that they could not afford one. This implies that, in the United States, women generally consider superior education more important to their future in the workforce than men. Even with more women than men enrolled in higher education, STEM fields, which represent jobs of higher average income, are still largely dominated by men, furthering income disparities by specialized professionals of both genders.

=== Climate change ===
According to MacGregor, women are more likely to be poor, and to be responsible for the care of poor children, than men. Furthermore in MacGregor's article, approximately 70 percent of the world's poor are women; rural women in developing countries are among the most disadvantaged groups on the planet. They are therefore unlikely to have the necessary resources to cope with the changes brought by climate change, and very likely to suffer a worsening of their everyday conditions, says MacGregor. MacGregor also says that poor women are more likely to be hurt or killed by natural disasters and extreme weather events than men. MacGregor also claims that there is evidence to suggest that when households experience food shortages, women tend to go without so that their children may eat, with all the health implications this brings for them. Since poverty and climate change are closely linked, the poorest and most disadvantaged groups often depend on climate-sensitive livelihoods like agriculture, which makes them disproportionately vulnerable to climate change. These groups lack the resources required to weather severe climatic effects like better houses and drought-resistant crops. This diminished adaptive capacity makes them even more vulnerable, pushing them to take part in unsustainable environmental practices such as deforestation in order to maintain their well-being. The extent to which people are impacted by climate change is partially a function of their social status, power, poverty, and access to and control over resources. Women are more vulnerable to the influences of climate change since they make up the bulk of the world's poor and are more dependent for their livelihood on natural resources that are threatened by climate change [more dependent than men on natural resources??]. Limited mobility combined with unequal access to resources and to decision-making processes places women in rural areas in a position where they are disproportionately affected by climate change. There are three main arguments in association to women and climate change. Firstly, that women need special attention because they are the poorest of the poor; secondly, because they have a higher mortality rate during natural disasters caused by climate change and thirdly because women are more environmentally conscious. While the first two refer mainly to the women in the South, the last is especially apparent in the literature on gender and climate change in the North. The feminization of poverty has been used to illustrate differences between male and female poverty in a given context as well as changes in male and female poverty over time. Typically, this approach has fed the perception that female-headed households, however, defined, tend to be poorer than other households. In some developing nations, such as Guatemala, women are frequently more disadvantaged than men by poor household infrastructure or the lack of piped water and less-consuming energy sources, according to Gammage.

=== Femonomics ===
In addition to lower earnings due to income gaps, women may encounter "Femonomics", or gender of money, a term created by Reeta Wolfsohn, CMSW, to reflect many of the inequities women face that increase their likelihood [how?] of suffering from financial difficulties. The image of a "traditional" woman and a traditional role still influences many cultures in today's world and is still not in full realisation that women are essential part of the economy. Women have unique healthcare problems/access problems related to reproduction increasing both their healthcare costs and risks. Research also suggests that females tend to live five years longer on average than men in the United States. The death of a spouse is an important determinant of female old-age poverty, as it leaves women in charge of the finances. However, women are more likely to be financially illiterate and thus have a harder time knowing how to manage their money.

In 2009 Gornick et al. found that older women (over 60) were typically much wealthier than their national average in Germany, US, UK, Sweden and Italy (data from 1999 to 2001). In the US their wealth holdings were four times the national median.

=== Health ===
Women in poverty have reduced access to health care services and resources. Being able to have good health, including reproductive health, be adequately nourished, and have proper shelter can make an enormous difference to their lives. Gender inequality in society prevents women from utilizing care services and therefore puts women at risk of poor health, nutrition, and severe diseases. Women in poverty are also more vulnerable to sexual violence and risk of HIV/AIDS, as they are less able to defend themselves from influential people who might sexually abuse them. HIV transmission adds to the stigma and social risk for women and girls. Other ailments such as malnutrition and parasite burden can weaken the mother and create a dangerous environment, making sex, birth, and maternal care riskier for poor women. In Korea poor health is a key factor in household poverty.

=== Women as a solution to poverty ===
Due to financial aid programs for impoverished families assuming only women to be responsible for the maintenance of a household and caring for children, the burden may fall on women to ensure this financial aid is properly managed. Such programs also tend to assume that women all have the same social standing and needs, even though this is not the case. This effect is exacerbated by the increased number of NGOs targeting solely female development. Women are expected to maintain the household as well as lift the family out of poverty, responsibilities which can add to the burden of poverty that females face in developing nations. In many areas, Conditional Cash Transfer (CCT) programs provide direct financial assistance to women with the goal of lifting them out of poverty, but they often end up limiting women's income-earning potential. The programs typically expect women to be responsible for the health and educational outcomes of their children, as well as require them to complete other program activities that don't allow them the time to pursue vocational or educational opportunities that would result in higher income-earning potential.

== Forms of poverty ==
=== Decision-making power ===
Decision-making power is central to the bargaining position of women within the household. It is how women and men make decisions that affect the entire household unit. However, women and men often have very different priorities when it comes to determining what is most important for the family. Factors that determine which member of the household has the most power in decision-making vary across cultures, but in most countries there is extreme gender inequality in the household. Men of the household usually have the power to determine what choices are made towards women's health, their ability to visit friends and family, and household expenditures. The ability to make choices for their own health affects both women and children's health. How household expenditures are decided affects women and children's education, health, and well-being. Women's freedom of mobility affects their ability to provide for their own needs as well as for the needs of their children.

Gender discrimination within households is often rooted in patriarchal biases against the social status of women. Major determinants of the household bargaining power include control of income and assets, age, and access to and level of education. As women's decision-making power increases, the welfare of their children and the family in general benefits. Women who achieve greater education are also more likely to worry about their children's survival, nutrition, and school attendance.

=== Disparate income ===
Lack of income is a principal reason for women's risk of poverty. Income deprivation prevents women from attaining resources and converting their monetary resources into socioeconomic status. Not only does higher income allow greater access to job skills; obtaining more job skills raises income as well. As women earn less income than men and struggle to access public benefits. They are deprived of basic education and health care, which eventually becomes a cycle to debilitate women's ability to earn higher income.

=== Energy poverty ===
Energy poverty is the inability of a household to secure a socially and materially necessary level of domestic energy services. In developing countries it usually means lacking electricity or clean cooking facilities; in developed countries it usually means being unable to afford adequate heating, cooling and lighting. In 2024, an estimated 655 million people had no access to electricity, more than 560 million of them in sub-Saharan Africa, and about two billion cooked with polluting fuels and technologies.

In developing countries, poor women and girls living in the rural areas are significantly affected by energy poverty, because they are usually responsible for providing the primary energy for households. In developed countries, old women living alone are mostly affected by energy poverty due to the low income and high cost of energy service.

Household energy access is increasingly important for health as the climate warms, for example through cooling, but a 2019 review found that most research on household energy does not take climate change into account.

Women and children do most fuel and water collection in households without modern energy. World Health Organization survey data from 13 countries found that girls in sub-Saharan African homes using polluting cookstoves spend about 18 hours a week collecting fuel or water, compared with 15 hours for boys. In homes that mainly use cleaner stoves and fuels, the figures are 5 and 2 hours.

=== Lack of assets ===
According to Martha Nussbaum, one central human functional capability is being able to hold property of both land and movable goods. In various nations, women are not full equals under the law, which means they do not have the same property rights as men; the rights to make a contract; or the rights of association, mobility, and religious liberty. Assets are primarily owned by husbands or are used for household production or consumption, neither of which help women with loan repayments. In order to refund their loans, women are usually required to undergo the 'disempowering' process of having to work harder as wage laborers, while also encountering a growing gendered resource divide at the domestic level. One of the major factors influencing women to greater poverty are the limited opportunities, capabilities, and empowerment in terms of access to and control over production resources of land, labor, human capital assets including education and health, and social capital assets such as participation at various levels, legal rights, and protection.

=== Time poverty ===
Time is a component that is included in poverty because it is an essential resource that is oftentimes distributed inequitably across individuals, especially in the context of the inadequacy of other resources. It is extremely relevant to gender, with a marked difference in gender roles and responsibilities observed across the world. Women are certainly more time-poor than men across the income distribution. Women concentrate on reproductive or unremunerated activities, while men concentrate in productive or compensated activities. Women generally face more limited access to leisure and work more hours in the sum of productive and reproductive work than do men. Time poverty can be interpreted in regards to the lack of sufficient time to rest and sleep. The greater the time devoted to paid or unremunerated work, the less time there is available for other activities such as relaxation and pleasure. A person who lacks adequate time to sleep and rest, levies and works in a state of 'time poverty'. The allocation of time between women and men in the household and in the economy, is a major gender issue in the evolving discourse on time poverty. According to the capabilities approach, any inquiry into people's well-being must involve asking not only how much people make but also how they manage their time in order to obtain the goods and services to meet their livelihoods. Time poverty is a serious constraint on individual well-being as it prevents having sufficient rest and sleep, enjoying leisure, and taking part in community or social life.

=== Capability deprivations ===
Since the last twenty-five years, feminist research has consistently stressed the importance of more holistic conceptual frameworks to encapsulate gendered privation. These include: 'capability' and 'human development' frameworks, which identify factors such as deprivations in education and health. Another is 'livelihoods' frameworks, which indicate social as well as material assets. Also, 'social exclusion' perspectives, which highlight the marginalization of the poor; and frameworks which stress the significance of subjective dimensions of poverty such as self-esteem, dignity, choice, and power. A higher share of women than of men are poor, women undergo greater depth or severity of poverty than men, women are likely to experience more persistent and longer-term poverty than men, women's irregular burden of poverty is increasing relative to men, women face more difficulties in lifting themselves out of poverty, and women-headed households are the 'poorest of the poor' are the common characterizations of the 'Feminization of poverty'.

=== Deprivation of health outcomes ===
Poor women are more vulnerable to chronic diseases because of material deprivation and psychosocial stress, higher levels of risk behavior, unhealthy living conditions and limited access to good quality healthcare. Women are more susceptible to diseases in poverty because they are less well-nourished and healthy than men and more vulnerable to physical violence and sexual abuse. Being able to have good health, including reproductive health, be adequately nourished, and have adequate shelter can make an enormous difference to their lives. Violence against women is a major contributing factor to HIV infection. Stillwaggon argues that in sub-Saharan Africa poverty associated with high-risk for HIV transmission adds to the stigma and social risk for women and girls in particular. Poverty and its correlates like malnutrition and parasite burden can weaken the host and create a dangerous environment, making sex and birth and medical care riskier for poor women.

=== Social and cultural exclusions ===
Other metrics can be used besides the poverty line, to see whether or not people are impoverished in their respective countries. The concept of social and cultural exclusion helps to better convey poverty as a process that involves multiple agents. Many developing countries have social and cultural norms that prevent women from having access to formal employment. Especially in parts of Asia, North Africa, and Latin America, the cultural and social norms do not allow women to have much labor productivity outside the home as well as an economic bargaining position within the household. This social inequality deprives women of capabilities, particularly employment, which leads to women having a higher risk of poverty. This increase in occupational gender segregation and widening of the gender wage gap increases women's susceptibility to poverty.

== Measures of poverty ==
An important aspect of analyzing the feminization of poverty is the understanding of how it is measured. It is inaccurate to assume that income is the only deprivation that affects women's poverty. To examine the issue from a multidimensional perspective, there must first be accurate and indices available for policy makers interested in gender empowerment. Often aggregate indices are criticized for their concentration on monetary issues, especially when data on women's income is sparse and groups women into one large, undifferentiated mass. Three indexes often examined are Gender-related Development Index, Gender Empowerment Measure, and Human Poverty Index. The first two are gendered- indices, in that they specifically gather data on women to evaluate gender inequalities, and are useful in understanding disparities in gender opportunities and choices. HPI, however, focuses on deprivation measures rather than income measures.

GDI adjusts the Human Development Index in three ways:

- Shows longevity, or life-expectancy of females and males
- Education or knowledge
- Decent standard of living

The aim of this index is to rank countries according to both their absolute level of human development and relative scores on gender equality. Although this index has increased government attention to gender inequality and development, its three measures have often been criticized for neglecting important aspects. Its relevance, however, continues to be integral to the understanding of the feminization of poverty, as countries with lower scores may then be then stimulated to focus on policies to assess and reduce gender disparities.

GEM measures female political and income opportunities through:

- Analyzing how many seats of government are occupied by women
- Proportion of management positions occupied by women
- Female share of jobs
- Estimated female to male income ratio

HPI is a multidimensional, non-income-based approach. It takes into consideration four dimensions:

- Survival
- Knowledge
- Decent standard of living
- Social participation

This index is useful in understanding and illuminating the differences between human poverty (which focuses on the denial of basic rights, such as dignity and freedom) and income poverty. For example, despite the U.S.'s high income stability, it is also ranked among the highest developed nations in human poverty. In her article, "Towards a Gendered Human Poverty Measure", Elizabeth Durbin critiques HPI and expands on the possibility of a gender-sensitive index. She argues that HPI incorporates three dimensions of poverty: life span measured by the proportion of the population expected to die before age 40, lack of knowledge measured by the proportion who are illiterate, and a decent standard of living measured by a composite index of access to health services, access to safe water, and malnutrition among children less than 5, that could specifically account for gender disparities. Despite its uses, however, HPI cannot be a true measure of poverty because it fails to examine certain deprivations, such as lack of property ownership and credit, that are essential to a stronger bargaining position in the household for women.

== Religion ==
Within many of the major religious groups in the world, focus is placed upon traditional gender roles and each individual's duty. Many devout followers of each religion have used their respective religious texts or rulings to further the poverty cycle of women around the world.

=== Islam ===
In a 2004 report by the Norwegian Institute for Urban and Regional Research, Muslim women were found more likely to work part-time jobs than Muslim men because of their religion's emphasis on the role of women as caregivers and housekeepers. The study found that these women are more likely to be financially dependent than men because they choose to participate less in the labor market. Muslim women who choose to wear traditional female Muslim accessories such as henna and hijabs may have a more difficult time finding employment than those who do not wear such clothing. On the local level, a woman was fired from a Jiffy Lube for refusing to remove her hijab at work because it violated the company's "no hat" rule. In the 2008 case Webb versus Philadelphia, the court ruled that an officer wearing her hijab with her uniform, was in violation of the states' standard of neutrality. Because of the violation of this standard, she was not allowed to legally wear the hijab while on duty.

=== Judaism ===
Under traditional Halachic law, Jewish women are also considered to be household caregivers rather than breadwinners. Within the Jewish text, the Mishnah, it states "she should fill for him his cup, make ready his bed and wash his face, hands and feet," when describing the role of women under Jewish law.

=== Christianity ===
Certain sects of Christianity also regard women as more family-oriented than men.

== Female poverty by region ==
Many developing countries in the world have exceptionally high rates of women under the poverty line. Many countries in Asia, Africa, and parts of Europe deprive women of access to higher income and important capabilities. Women in these countries are disproportionately put at the highest risk of poverty and continue to face social and cultural barriers that prevent them from escaping poverty.

=== East Asia ===
Although women in East Asia had greater access to employment, they faced job segregation in export industries, which placed them at a high risk of poverty.

China is a country with a long history of gender discrimination. In order to address gender inequality issues, Chinese leaders have created more access for women to obtain capabilities. As a result, Chinese women are granted greater access to health services, employment opportunities, and general recognition for their important contributions to the economy and society. Although China has grown tremendously in its economy over the past years, its economic growth has had minimal effect on decreasing the number of women below the poverty line. Economic growth did not reduce gender gaps in income or provide more formal employment opportunities for women. Instead, China's economic growth increased its use of informal employment, which has affected women disproportionately.

In the Republic of Korea, low wages for women helped instigate an economic growth in Korea since low-cost exports were mostly produced by women. Similar to China, Korean women mostly had the opportunity for informal employment, which deprives women of financial stability and safe working environments.

=== Africa ===
Women in Africa face considerable barriers to achieving economic equality with their male counterparts due to a general lack of property rights, access to credit, education and technical skills, health, protection against gender-based violence, and political power. Although women work 50% longer workdays than men, they receive two-thirds of the pay of their male counterparts and hold only 40% of formal salaried jobs. The longer workdays can be attributed to the cultural expectations of women to perform forms of unpaid labor such as gathering firewood, drawing water, childcare, eldercare, and housework. Women face greater challenges in finding employment because of their lack of education. According to Montenegro and Patrinos, one additional year of primary, secondary, and tertiary school can increase future wages by 17.5%, 12.7%, and 21.3% respectively. Unfortunately, due to factors such as child marriage, early pregnancy, and cultural norms, only 21% of girls complete tertiary school. Without formal property rights, women in Africa only own 15% of the land, which makes them more vulnerable to be economically dependent on male family members or partners and diminishes their ability to use property to access financial systems such as banks and loans. As a result of having less economic power, women are generally more vulnerable to gender-based violence and risk of HIV/AIDS.

=== Morocco ===
The female population, especially in rural areas, dominantly represents the face of poverty in Morocco. There have been two major methods to measure poverty in Morocco, which include the 'classic approach' and a second approach that pertains more towards the capabilities approach. The 'classic approach' uses the poverty line to statistically determine the impoverished population. This approach quantifies the number of poor individuals and households but does not take into account how the impoverished population lacks basic needs such as housing, food, health and education. The second approach focuses on satisfying this lack of basic needs and emphasizes the multidimensional nature of poverty.

Moroccan women represent the most economically insecure social group in the country. One of six Moroccan households are lone-mother households, which represent the most impoverished households in the country. Women are categorized to have the highest levels of socio-economic and legal constraints, which exclude them from obtaining their basic needs. Although recent surveys show that women actively help in providing for their families economically, Moroccan legal texts discourage women's participation in economic productivity. Article 114 of the Moroccan Family Law states, "every human being is responsible for providing for his needs by his own powers except the wife whose needs will be taken care of by her husband." The patriarchal social structure of Morocco puts women as being inferior to men in all aspects. Women are denied equal opportunities in education and employment before the law, as well as access to resources. As a result, the female population in Morocco suffers from deprivation of capabilities. Young girls are often excluded from educational opportunities due to limited financial resources within the household and the burden of household chores expected from them.

Over time, Moroccan women have gained more access to employment. However, this quantitative increase in labor participation for women has not been accompanied by higher qualitative standards of labor. The labor of rural women in Morocco remain unacknowledged and unpaid. Women are put into a higher risk of poverty as their domestic workload is added onto their unpaid labor. This balance of domestic labor and work outside the home imposes a burden on rural women. Since the socioeconomic exclusion of women deprive them of the capabilities to be educated and trained for certain employment skills, their susceptibility to poverty is heightened. Low educational skills of women directly relate to the limited employment options they have in society. Although both men and women are affected by unemployment, women are more likely to lose their jobs than men. Recent research in Morocco shows that economic recessions in the country affect women the most.

=== United Kingdom ===
An investigation of women below the poverty line in the United Kingdom between 1959 and 1984 discovered a substantial increase in the percentage of women who are in poverty in the 1960s. The percentage remained relatively constant in the 1970s, and then decreased between 1979 and 1984. The increase of women below the poverty line in the 1960s was determined to be from an increase of women in one-sex households. This was more adverse for black women than white women.

=== Dominican Republic ===
Dominican women make generally forty-four cents on the dollar as compared to men. This wage gap often leads to a high level of food insecurity among women in the Dominican Republic. Those in poverty have an increased likelihood to participate in dangerous behaviors such as unprotected sex and drug use. These behaviors put them at a greater risk for contracting HIV and other diseases. There is a negative stigma around HIV positive women in the Dominican Republic. For this reason, women are more likely to be subjected to health screenings when applying for a job. If the screening reveals a person is HIV positive, they are less likely to be given employment.

=== United States ===
In 2016, 14.0% of women and 11.3% of men were below the poverty threshold. The 2016 poverty threshold was $12,228 for single people and $24,339 for a family of four with two children.

In response, the United States government provides financial assistance to those who do not earn as much money. In 2015, 23.2% of women were given financial assistance compared with 19.3% of men. More women are given financial assistance than men in all government programs (Medicaid, SNAP, housing assistance, SSI, TANF/GA). Women were given 86% of child-support in 2013.

=== India ===
The poverty that women experience in India is known as human poverty, or issues of inadequate food, housing, education, healthcare, sanitation, poor developmental policies, and more. Poverty has been prevalent in India for many years, but there was a noticeable increase after globalization in 1991 when the International Monetary Fund instilled a structural adjustment program (SAP) in order to give India a loan. Large amounts of capital flowed into the country but also led to the exploitation of the Indian market, particularly of women for their cheap labor. This reduced their opportunities for education and escape from the poverty trap.

The Indian Constitution has proclaimed that all citizens have equal rights, but this is not always practiced by all Indians. Sex-selective abortion is a wide phenomenon in India in which boys are preferentially selected. In order to get married, it is normal to see the woman's family paying dowry to the man's family. This leads to more sex-selective abortion as girls are more costly for the family, and less focus on female development.

==== Home life ====
Women are restricted in India due to a heavy dependency of social status on a woman's appearance and activity around the home. Poor behavior on their part results in lower social status and shame for the male head of the family. Women are expected to maintain the household with a strict schedule. Husbands often move to the city to find work and leave their wife as the primary earner in their absence. Women in these situations may resort to using favors or borrowing money in order to survive, which they must later return in cash with interest. Young girls are especially vulnerable to prostitution or bribing as a form of repayment. Competition amongst women around water, food, and employment is also prevalent, especially in urban slums.

==== Employment ====
The expectation for Indian women is to be the sole care taker and maintainer of the home. If women leave their children and work, the children are often left in the hands of an inadequate care taker (possibly the eldest daughter) and do not get enough resources for development. In many areas, working outside of the home is seen as symbolic of having low status. Upper-class women have similar social restrictions, although lower class women frequently have a larger necessity of the added income than upper class women. Men tend to send money back to extended family, whereas money that a woman makes goes to her husband. This reduces the incentive of the family to urge their daughter to find work as they wouldn't receive money but would face shame in society.

Conceptual barriers prevent women from being accepted as equally paid and equally able laborers. In many ways women are seen as excess reserve labor and get pushed into roles that are known as being dirty, unorganized, arduous, and underdeveloped. They are hurt by the mechanization of industries. While self-employment is a viable option, there is always a large risk of failure and exploitation.

==== Healthcare ====
Healthcare is difficult to access for women, particularly elderly women. Public clinics are overcrowded, understaffed, and have high transportation costs, while private clinics are too expensive without insurance. Females are more likely to get ill than males, although males receive medical advice with higher frequency. Women frequently feel as if they are a burden to their husband or son when they get sick and require money to purchase the correct medicines. Some believe that their symptoms are not serious or important enough to spend money on. When women do receive some form of care, many times medical providers are biased against them and are partial to treating men over women. Many mothers also die during childbirth or pregnancy as they suffer from malnutrition and anemia. Over 50% of women in the National Family Health Surveys were anemic.

==== Nutrition ====
Poverty is a large source of malnutrition in women. Women in poverty are not allowed to eat the nutritious food that men are when it is available. While it is the women's job to obtain the food, it is fed to the men of the household. The 2005-2006 National Family Health Survey found that more men drink milk and eat fruit in comparison to women, and that less than 5% of women and girls in the states of Punjab, Haryana, and Rajasthan eat meat or eggs. Poor nutrition begins at a young age and gets worse as women mature and become mothers.

==== Education ====
Effective policies to aid in expanding female education are not productively enforced by the Government of India. Data from the 2001 census showed that primary school completion rates were around 62% for boys and 40% for girls. Teenage girls are generally taught how to care for their siblings and cook food and not taught math or science. Some families may believe men to be more qualified than women to get a higher paying job. In many instances this inequality between male and female education leads to child marriage, teenage pregnancies, and a male dominated household. Evidence suggests that educating girls results in reduced fertility, due to an urge to work and pursue higher social status. This lessens the financial burden on families.

== Policies ==
=== Conditional cash transfer ===
Conditional cash transfer is a possible policy for addressing current and intergenerational poverty where poor women play a central role. Women in the role as mothers are given the additional work burdens imposed. Conditional cash transfers are not ideal for addressing single-mother poverty.

=== Microcredit ===
Microcredit can be a potential policy for assisting poor women in developing countries. Microcredit is a tool design to hopefully alleviate poverty given that women living in developing countries have very few resources and connections for survival due to not having a solid financial foundation.

=== Welfare reform in the U.S. ===
In light of welfare reforms as of 2001, federal legislation required recipients of welfare (mainly aided to families) to participate in an educational or vocational school and work part-time in order to receive the benefits. Recipients attending a college now have 3 years to complete those degree in order to get people to work as quickly as possible. To try towards a system of reward, Mojisola Tiamiyu and Shelley Mitchell, suggest implementing child care services to promote employment. Women with children work in either low-paying or part-time jobs that are insufficient to raise a family. Single parenting in the United States has increased to 1 in 4 families being headed by a single parent. It is estimated that children living in single parent homes are as much as 4 times more likely to become impoverished (Juvenilization of poverty).

== See also ==
- Reproductive labor – Type of domestic labor
- Capability approach – Normative approach to human welfare
- Cycle of poverty – Vicious cycle that reinforces poverty
- Employment discrimination – Form of discrimination
- Female education – Complex set of issues and debates surrounding education for girls and women
- Feminization (sociology) – Shift in cultural norms
- Health – Desirable level of functional or metabolic efficiency of a living being
- Impact of health on intelligence
- Intra-household bargaining – Negotiations within a household
- Occupational segregation – Distribution of workers across and within occupations
- Participation
- Poverty – Lack of economic resources
- Sexism – Prejudice or discrimination based on a person's sex or gender
- Single parent – Parent raising a child alone
- Single person – Person not in a marital, romantic or sexual relationship
- Stereotype threat – Situational predicament
- Unintended pregnancy – Pregnancy that is mistimed, unplanned or unwanted at the time of conception
- Juvenilization of poverty – Processes by which children are at a higher risk for being poor
- Feminisation of survival – Trend towards inclusive modes of working
- Welfare queen – Derogatory term for welfare abusers
