= Construction collaboration technology =

Construction collaboration technology refers to software applications used to enable effective sharing of project-related information between geographically dispersed members of a construction project team, often through use of a web-based software as a service platform.

== History ==
The terms "construction collaboration" and "construction collaboration software" were coined in Australia by Aconex in 2001. It was later adopted in 2003 in the UK when seven UK-based vendors joined together to form the Network for Construction Collaboration Technology Providers (NCCTP), to promote the benefits and use of collaborative technologies in the architecture, engineering, construction (AEC) and related industries.

The phrase was taken on in the UK as it was preferred to the then commonly used term 'project extranet' which was felt might exclude use of the platforms for multi-project programmes of work, or for post-construction collaboration - e.g.: for facilities management. It also supported progressive moves within the UK construction industry to promote more collaborative or integrated approaches following the 1994 Latham and 1998 Egan Reports. For example, Sir John Egan's follow-up report, Accelerating Change in 2002, recommended:

'Integrated teams, created at the optimal time in the process and using an integrated IT approach, that fully release the contribution each can make and equitably share risk and reward in a non-adversarial way.' (p.10, emphasis added)

Other descriptions such as 'construction project management' or 'construction document management' were seen as confusing or misleading, being associated more with scheduling tools (e.g.: Microsoft Project) or with generic electronic document management systems (e.g.: Documentum) that could not easily handle AEC-oriented requirements for dispersed teams.

== Characteristics ==
Essentially, construction collaboration technologies are deployed to support the requirements of a multi-disciplinary construction project team. This is typically drawn from multiple companies, all based in different locations with their own IT systems, and is brought together – usually temporarily – to plan, design, construct and, in some cases, to operate and maintain the resulting built asset. It is common for construction collaboration technology to be cloud based, or hosted as a centralised database. These platforms enable information to be shared and accessed in real-time by all team members.

Construction collaboration technologies replace localised sets of data held by individual team members or companies. A centralised repository or data store is created that can be accessed by all authorised team members, usually using a lowest common denominator technology: a computer equipped with a web browser and a telecommunications link to the internet. The platforms' functionality also reflects the industry's extensive use of graphical information - most notably design drawings - and the need to be able to access, view, mark-up and comment on designs.

The core characteristics of construction collaboration technologies can be summarised as:

- Organisation features (i.e.: security settings, user administration, information administration)
- Communication features (i.e.: file publication, management, feedback)
- Management features (i.e.: management of specific workflows, teams, work packages, multiple projects, standards)
- Sharing, viewing and working with CAD-based drawings (including use of viewing tools)

Reflecting the need to encourage take-up and active use of their platforms, the leading UK construction collaboration technology vendors all adopted a similar charging structure. Rather than charging companies per-user or per-seat licenses, the applications were typically licensed per-project, with customers paying a single subscription (typically monthly or quarterly) for the duration of the planning, design and construction process, and allowing use by all companies in the project's supply chain.

== Vendors ==
The founder members of the NCCTP were: 4Projects (Since Acquired by Viewpoint Construction Software), BIW Technologies, BuildOnline, Cadweb, Causeway Technologies and Sarcophagus. Business Collaborator and Aconex joined shortly afterwards. The NCCTP was initially managed by CIRIA before becoming a membership forum within Constructing Excellence in August 2007.

== See also ==
- Extranet
- List of collaborative software
- Construction Communication
