= Aconex =

Australian company providing collaboration technologies

Aconex Limited
- Type: Public
- Industry: Computer software
- Founded: Melbourne (2000)
- Headquarters: Melbourne, Australia
- Key people: Leigh Jasper, CEO and co-founder Robert Phillpot, SVP and co-founder
- Products: Aconex Platform, Aconex Connected BIM, Aconex Field, Aconex Handover
- Revenue: $123.4m AUD (2016)
- Website: Aconex

Aconex Limited (ASX: ACX) was an ASX 200 listed public Australian company providing mobile and web-based collaboration technologies for project information and process management (also sometimes described as project management or project extranet systems), on a software as a service (SaaS) basis, to clients in the construction, infrastructure, power, mining, and oil and gas sectors.

On 17 December 2017, Oracle Corporation agreed to purchase Aconex in a deal valuing the business at A$7.80 per share (US$1.19 billion). Shareholders approved the takeover bid on 14 March 2018; Supreme Court of Victoria approval was granted on Thursday, 15 March 2018. Oracle now offers Aconex solutions via its Oracle Aconex platform.

== History ==
Aconex was founded in 2000 by Leigh Jasper and Robert Phillpot to offer construction collaboration and procurement management services (its name is a concatenation of Australian Construction Exchange). However, due to low market interest in web-based procurement, it focused on expanding its online collaboration services, growing domestic revenue rapidly during the first half of the 2000s.

By late 2004, Aconex had established a presence in the UK market, and was expanding into other regions, including Southeast Asia and the Middle East. Its overseas activity helped it win the 'Emerging Exporter' award in the 2006 Australian Export Awards.

In September 2008, Aconex secured an A$107.5m private equity investment from US-based technology investor Francisco Partners. It has since established a substantial presence in North America.

By 2014, Aconex had served construction and engineering projects with an aggregate value of more than A$800 billion, across all major geographic markets, from more than 40 offices worldwide.

The company completed its initial public offering (IPO) of ordinary shares on December 9, 2014 and was listed on the Australian Securities Exchange (ASX) under the ticker code ACX.

In August 2015, Aconex purchased the Incite Keystone platform from CIMIC group.

In March 2016, Aconex acquired the Germany-based Conject Holding GmbH for A$96m.

On 17 December 2017, Oracle bought Aconex for AUD 7.80 per share in cash.

== Products / services ==
Aconex services include:

- Construction project information and process management (managing processes, documents, drawings, building information models, communications, workflows, audit trails, and other project information online - both mobile and web access)
- Construction field management (managing field inspections and issues from mobile devices)
- O&M manuals (developing digital operation and maintenance manuals for post-construction handover to asset owner and dynamic management of asset information)
- BIM (building information modeling) data and process management (accessing and managing BIM models at the object level for project management)
- Interface management (identifying and resolving interface issues on oil and gas projects)

In 2011, the company launched an online bidding network, branded BidContender. In 2011 and 2012, the company launched Aconex Mobile - mobile applications (iPhone and iPad) for access to the Aconex online collaboration platform. In 2012, the company launched Aconex Field - a mobile field inspection and issues management solution for the iPhone and iPad, and an Android version followed in 2013. Also in 2013, the company launched Aconex Smart Manuals - a collaboration solution for the post-construction handover of digital operation and maintenance (O&M) manuals. In 2014, the company launched Aconex Connected BIM - an extension of the Aconex platform for BIM project collaboration - and Aconex Handover - a suite of post-construction handover solutions that includes Smart Manuals and Dynamic Manuals, a mobile solution for asset information management.

== See also ==
- Extranet
- List of collaborative software
