= Alan Duncan =

British politician (born 1957)

The Right Honourable Sir Alan Duncan KCMG
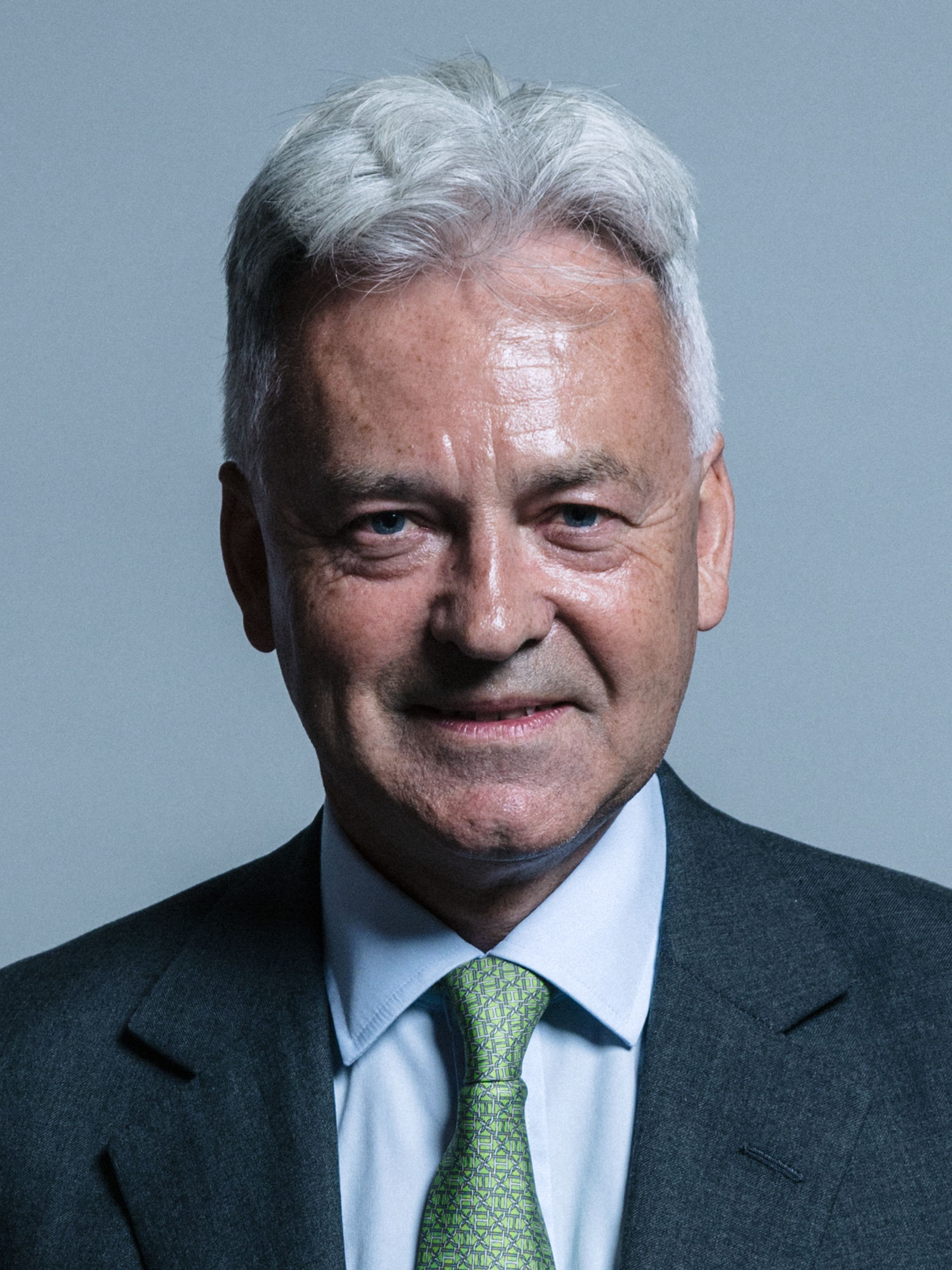
- Official portrait, 2017

Minister of State for Europe and the Americas
- In office 15 July 2016 – 22 July 2019
- Prime Minister: Theresa May
- Preceded by: David Lidington
- Succeeded by: Chris Pincher

Minister of State for International Development
- In office 13 May 2010 – 14 July 2014
- Prime Minister: David Cameron
- Preceded by: Gareth Thomas
- Succeeded by: Desmond Swayne
Shadow Cabinet positions
Shadow Minister for Prisons
In office 7 September 2009 – 11 May 2010
Leader	David Cameron
Preceded by	Edward Garnier
Succeeded by	Shabana Mahmood
Shadow Leader of the House of Commons
In office 19 January 2009 – 7 September 2009
Leader	David Cameron
Preceded by	Theresa May
Succeeded by	George Young
Shadow Secretary of State for Business, Enterprise and Regulatory Reform
In office 8 December 2005 – 19 January 2009
Leader	David Cameron
Preceded by	David Willetts (Trade and Industry)
Succeeded by	Ken Clarke (Business, Innovation and Skills)
Shadow Secretary of State for Transport
In office 10 May 2005 – 8 December 2005
Leader	Michael Howard
Preceded by	Tim Yeo (Environment and Transport)
Succeeded by	Chris Grayling
Shadow Secretary of State for International Development
In office 8 September 2004 – 10 May 2005
Leader	Michael Howard
Preceded by	John Bercow
Succeeded by	Andrew Mitchell
Shadow Secretary of State for Constitutional Affairs
In office 10 November 2003 – 8 September 2004
Leader	Michael Howard
Preceded by	Bill Cash
Succeeded by	Oliver Heald

Member of Parliament for Rutland and Melton
- In office 9 April 1992 – 6 November 2019
- Preceded by: Michael Latham
- Succeeded by: Alicia Kearns

Personal details
- Born: Alan James Carter Duncan; 31 March 1957 (age 69) Rickmansworth, Hertfordshire, England
- Party: Conservative
- Spouse: James Dunseath
- Education: St John's College, Oxford (BA); Harvard University

Sir Alan James Carter Duncan KCMG (born 31 March 1957) is a British former politician who served as Minister of State for International Development from 2010 to 2014 and Minister of State for Europe and the Americas from 2016 to 2019. A member of the Conservative Party, he was the Member of Parliament (MP) for Rutland and Melton from 1992 to 2019.

Duncan began his career in the oil industry with Royal Dutch Shell, and was first elected to the House of Commons in the 1992 general election. After gaining several minor positions in the government of John Major, he played a key role in William Hague's successful bid for the Conservative leadership in 1997. Duncan received several promotions to the Conservative front bench, and eventually joined the Shadow Cabinet after the 2005 general election. He stood for the Conservative leadership in 2005, but withdrew early on because of a lack of support. Eventual winner David Cameron appointed him Shadow Secretary of State for Trade and Industry in December 2005; the name of the department he shadowed was changed to Department for Business, Enterprise and Regulatory Reform in July 2007.

Following the 2010 general election, the new Conservative Prime Minister Cameron appointed Duncan as Minister of State for International Development. He left this post following the government reshuffle in July 2014, and was subsequently appointed a Knight Commander of the Order of St Michael and St George in September 2014, for services to international development and to UK–Middle East relations. While on the backbenches, Duncan served on the Intelligence and Security Committee between 2015 and 2016.

After two years out of government, Duncan returned to frontline politics when new Prime Minister Theresa May appointed him as Minister for Europe and the Americas, and effective deputy to then-Foreign Secretary Boris Johnson, in July 2016. Duncan resigned as Minister of State on 22 July 2019 citing Johnson's election to the Tory leadership and, hence, the UK's premiership.

Duncan became the first openly gay Conservative Member of Parliament, publicly coming out in 2002.

== Early life ==
Duncan was born in Rickmansworth, Hertfordshire, the second son of James Grant Duncan, an RAF wing commander, and his wife Anne Duncan (née Carter), a teacher. The family travelled much, following Duncan's father on NATO postings, including in Gibraltar, Italy, and Norway.

== Education ==
Duncan was educated at two independent schools: Beechwood Park School in Markyate, and Merchant Taylors' School in Northwood, at both of which he was 'Head Monitor' (head boy). He had two brothers, who also attended Beechwood Park School. Their family supported the Liberal Party, and Duncan ran (and lost) as a Liberal at a school mock election in 1970; two years later he joined the Young Conservatives.

He then attended St John's College, Oxford, where he coxed the college's first eight, and was elected President of the Oxford Union in 1979. Whilst there, he formed a friendship with Benazir Bhutto, and ran her successful campaign to become the President of the Oxford Union. He gained a Kennedy Scholarship to study at Harvard University between 1981 and 1982.

== Business career ==
After graduating from Oxford, Duncan worked as a trader of oil and refined products, first with Royal Dutch Shell (1979–81) and then for Marc Rich from 1982 to 1988 (Rich became a fugitive from justice in 1983). He worked for Rich in London and Singapore. Duncan used the connections he had built up to be self-employed from 1988 to 1992, acting as a consultant and adviser to foreign governments on oil supplies, shipping and refining.

In 1989, Duncan set up the independent Harcourt Consultants, which advises on oil and gas matters. He made over £1 million after helping fill the need to supply oil to Pakistan after supplies from Kuwait had been disrupted in the Gulf War.

== Political career ==
Duncan was an active member of the Battersea Conservative Association from 1979 until 1984, when he moved to live in Singapore, from which he returned in 1986. After Prime Minister Margaret Thatcher resigned in November 1990, he offered his home in Westminster as the headquarters of John Major's leadership campaign.

=== Member of Parliament ===
Duncan first stood for Parliament as a Conservative candidate in the 1987 general election, unsuccessfully contesting the safe Labour seat of Barnsley West and Penistone. For the 1992 general election he was selected as the Conservative candidate for Rutland and Melton, a safe Conservative seat, which he retained with a 59% share of the votes cast. In the Labour landslide of 1997, his proportion of the vote was reduced to 46% but increased at subsequent elections to a high of 62.8% in 2017.

From 1993 to 1995, Duncan was a member of the Social Security Select Committee. His first governmental position was as Parliamentary Private Secretary to the Minister of Health, a position he obtained in December 1993. He resigned from the position within a month, after it emerged that he had used the Right to Buy programme to make profits on property deals. It emerged that he had lent his elderly next-door neighbour money to buy his home under the Right to Buy legislation. The neighbour bought an 18th-century council house at a significant discount and sold it to Duncan just over three years later. Gyles Brandreth describes this event in his diary: "little Alan Duncan has fallen on his sword. He did it swiftly and with good grace."

After returning to the backbenches, he became Chairman of the Conservative Backbench Constitutional Affairs Committee. He returned to government in July 1995, when he was again appointed a Parliamentary Private Secretary, this time to the Chairman of the Conservative Party, Brian Mawhinney. In November 1995, Duncan performed a citizen's arrest on an Asylum Bill protester who threw paint and flour at Mawhinney on College Green.

Duncan was involved in the 1997 leadership contest, being the right-hand man of William Hague, the eventual winner. In this capacity, he was called "the closest thing [the Conservatives] have to Peter Mandelson". Duncan and Hague had both been at Oxford, both been Presidents of the Oxford Union, and had been close friends since at least the early 1980s.

=== Front-bench career ===
As a reward for his loyalty to Hague during the leadership contest, in June 1997, Duncan was entrusted with the positions of Vice Chairman of the Conservative Party and Parliamentary Political Secretary to the Party Leader. He became Shadow Health Minister in June 1998. A year later he was made Shadow Trade and Industry spokesman, and he was appointed a front-bench spokesman on Foreign and Commonwealth Affairs in September 2001.

When Michael Howard became Conservative Party leader in November 2003, Duncan became Shadow Secretary of State for Constitutional Affairs, but as Howard had significantly reduced the size of the Shadow Cabinet, Duncan was not promoted to the top table. This continued to be the case when he was moved to become Shadow Secretary of State for International Development in September 2004. However, following the 2005 general election, the Shadow Cabinet was expanded to its original size once more, and Duncan joined it as Shadow Secretary of State for Transport.

He held this position for just seven months, becoming Shadow Secretary of State for Trade and Industry on 7 December 2005, after David Cameron's election to the party leadership the previous day. On 2 July 2007, he was appointed Shadow Secretary of State for Business, Enterprise and Regulatory Reform, as new prime minister Gordon Brown had abolished the Department of Trade and Industry the previous week, replacing it with the aforementioned new department. In January 2009, Duncan became Shadow Leader of the House of Commons.

=== Failed leadership bid ===
Before the 2005 general election, he was rumoured to be planning a leadership campaign in the event that then-leader Michael Howard stepped down after a (then-likely and later actual) election defeat. On 10 June 2005, Duncan publicly declared his intention of standing in the 2005 leadership election. However, on 18 July 2005, he withdrew from the race, admitting in The Guardian that his withdrawal was due to a lack of 'active lieutenants', and urged the party to abandon those that he dubbed the 'Tory Taliban':

Our Achilles heel, though, has been our social attitude. Censorious judgmentalism from the moralising wing, which treats half our own countrymen as enemies, must be rooted out. We should take J. S. Mill as our lodestar, and allow people to live as they choose until they actually harm someone. If the Tory Taliban can't get that, they'll condemn us all to oblivion. Thank heavens for the new intake of MPs who do.

=== MPs' expenses 2009 ===
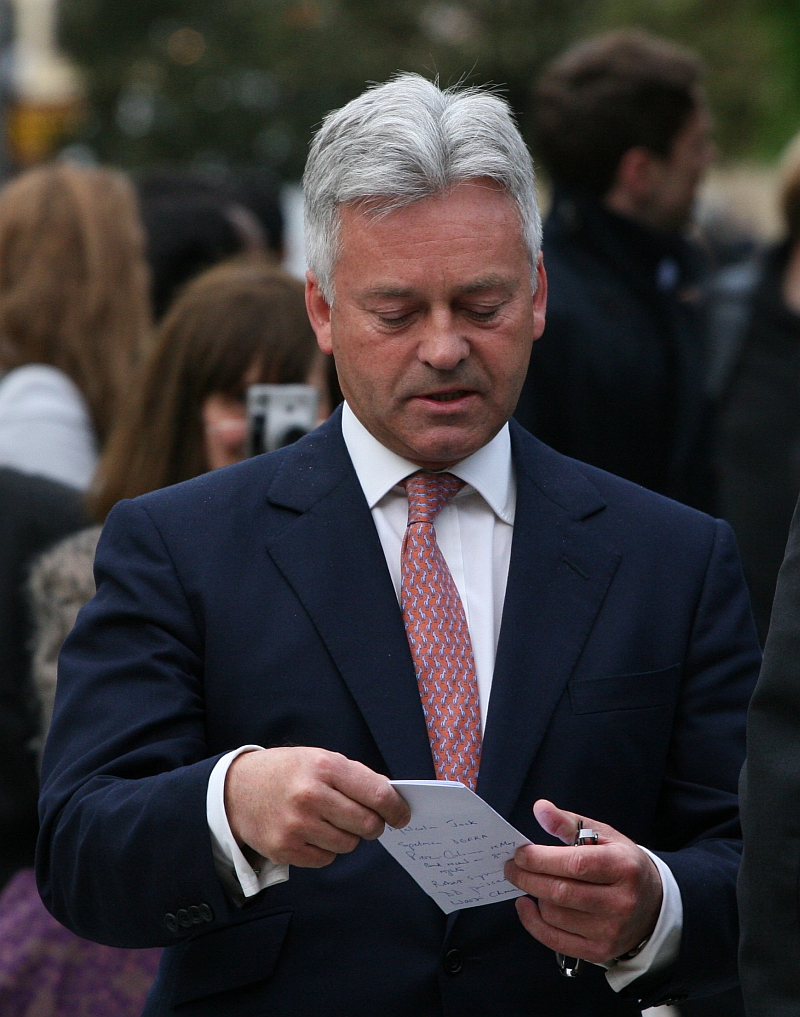
Duncan in 2010

On 15 May 2009, the satirical BBC programme Have I Got News for You showed footage of Duncan's previous appearance on the show in which he boasted about his second home allowance, denied that he should pay any of the money back and stated it was "a great system". The show then cut to footage of David Cameron announcing that Duncan would return money to the fees office, followed by Duncan's personal apology, in which he called for the system to be changed.

On 14 August, Duncan said (whilst being filmed without his knowledge by Don't Panic), that MPs, who were at the time paid around £64,000 a year, were having "to live on rations and are treated like shit. I spend my money on my garden and claim a tiny fraction on what is proper. And I could claim the whole lot, but I don't." These remarks attracted the attention of the press, and were criticised by commentators from all sides. Duncan apologised once more, and Cameron, though critical of Duncan's comments, denied that he would sack him from the Shadow Cabinet. Despite these assurances, on 7 September 2009, Duncan was "demoted" from the Shadow Cabinet, to become Shadow Minister for Prisons, after he and Cameron came to an agreement that his position was untenable.

=== Political funding ===
The Rutland and Melton Constituency Association has received £12,166.66 in donations since 2006. Duncan has received corporate donations from The Biz Club (£6,000, 2006–09), Midland Software Holdings (£8,000, 2007–09), and ABM Holdings (£1,500, 2009). Duncan has also had tens of thousands of pounds from private individual donors.

=== WikiLeaks 2010 ===
According to a US diplomatic cable published by WikiLeaks and reported on by The Daily Telegraph and The Guardian, US Intelligence drew up a dossier on several members of the Conservative party, including Duncan, in order to assess the possible policies of a future Conservative government. US intelligence compiled details of Duncan's political associations with leading Conservatives, including William Hague. The cable called for further intelligence of "Duncan's relationship with Conservative party leader David Cameron and William Hague", and asked: "What role would Duncan play if the Conservatives form a government? What are Duncan's political ambitions?"

=== Nuclear power ===
As shadow business secretary in 2008, Duncan stated, referring to the Hinkley Point C project, that "on no account should there be any kind of subsidy for nuclear power."

=== Middle East ===
In August 2011, Duncan found himself under pressure to remove a video of himself accusing Israel of a "land grab" in the occupied territories. In an October 2014 speech to the Royal United Services Institute, Duncan said: "Indeed just as we rightly judge someone as unfit for public office if they refuse to recognise Israel, so we should shun anyone who refuses to recognise settlements are illegal. No settlement endorsers should be regarded as fit to stand for public office, remain a member of a mainstream political party or sit in a parliament. How can we accept lawmakers in our country or any other country when they support lawbreakers in another?" In a BBC Radio interview linked to that speech and another given during a House of Commons debate on Palestinian statehood he said: "All know that the United States is in hock to a very powerful financial lobby which dominates its politics." Commenting on Duncan's statements, a spokesman for the Board of Deputies of British Jews called him "breathtakingly one-sided".

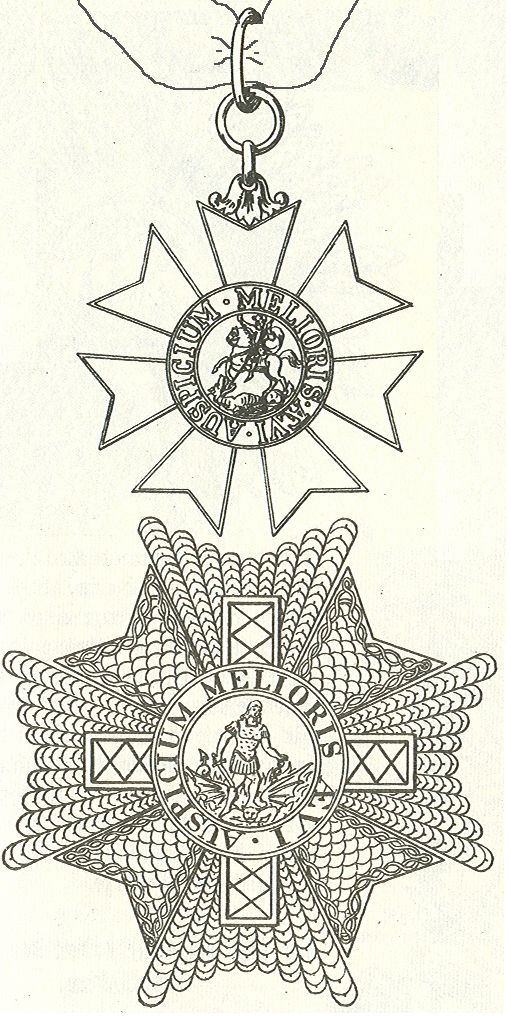
Star and badge of a KCMG

=== Libyan oil cell ===
In August 2011, it was reported that Duncan had played an instrumental role in blocking fuel supplies to Tripoli, Libya, during the Libyan conflict. In April 2011, the former oil trader convinced the UK prime minister to establish the so-called 'Libyan oil cell', which was run out of the Foreign Office.

The cell advised NATO to blockade the port of Zawiya to stifle Gaddafi's war effort. They also helped identify other passages the smugglers were using to get fuel into Libya via Tunisia and Algeria.

London-based oil traders were encouraged to sell fuel to rebels in Benghazi, with communication being established between traders and the rebels to route the fuel.

One Whitehall source commented: 'The energy noose tightened around Tripoli's neck. It was much more effective and easier to repair than bombs. It is like taking the key of the car away. You can't move. The great thing is you can switch it all back on again if Gaddafi goes. It is not the same as if you have bombed the whole city to bits.

=== Appointment to Privy Council ===
On 28 May 2010, he was appointed to the Privy Council, upon the formation of the Coalition government. He was sworn into the Privy Council on 9 June 2010 at Buckingham Palace. This entitled him to the Honorific Prefix "The Right Honourable" for life.

=== Comments by Israeli embassy official ===
In January 2017, Al Jazeera aired a series entitled The Lobby. The last episode showed Shai Masot, the political officer at the Israeli embassy in London, proposing an attempt to "take down" British "pro-Palestinian" politicians, including Duncan. The leader of the opposition Jeremy Corbyn wrote an open letter to Theresa May objecting to what he called an "improper interference in this country's democratic process" and urging the prime minister to launch an inquiry on the basis that "[t]his is clearly a national security issue". The Israeli ambassador Mark Regev apologised to Duncan for the "completely unacceptable" comments made in the video. A Foreign Office spokesman, effectively rejecting Corbyn's comments, said it "is clear these comments do not reflect the views of the embassy or government of Israel". Masot resigned shortly after the recordings were made public. Pro-Israel British activists and a former Israel embassy employee complained to Ofcom about The Lobby, but Ofcom dismissed all charges.

== Political views ==
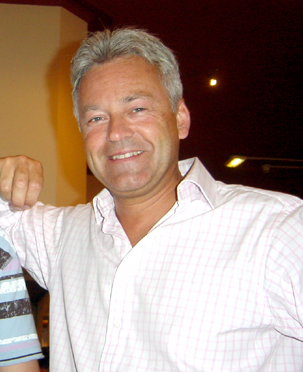
Duncan was described in 2008 as a 'moderniser' in the Conservative Party

Duncan was described by the BBC in 2002 as a right-wing libertarian. The Guardian has described him in 'economically libertarian' (2008) and 'socially libertarian' (2004). The LGBT journal PinkNews called him in 2005 the 'liberal, urbane face of the Conservative Party', naming him as one of the then '50 most powerful LGBT people in British politics'. He was described by The Daily Telegraph in 2008 as a "moderniser".

One of the chapters in his book Saturn's Children is devoted to an explanation of his support for the legalisation of all drugs. This chapter was removed when the paperback edition was published to prevent embarrassment to the party leadership; however, Duncan had, at one time, posted the chapter on his website, "for the benefit of the enquiring student". Duncan believes in minimising the size of government, and in Saturn's Children advocated limiting government responsibility to essential services such as defence, policing and health.

In 2002, Duncan was described by the BBC as a "staunch" Eurosceptic. However, he declared for the 'Remain' camp in the run-up to the UK's referendum on EU membership. On 2 October 2017, Duncan spoke at the Chicago Council of Global Affairs. In his speech he attributed Britain's majority vote to leave the EU to a "blue-collar tantrum against immigration".

The manner in which the campaign was fought stirred up a lot of sentiment amongst people that are not habitual voters, particularly on the issue of immigration. You could feel in the last 10 days of the campaign, traditional blue-collar urban Labour opinion going viral for leave. They were stirred up by an image of immigration, which made them angry and throw a bit of a tantrum. That was part of the chemistry that explains the result.

He is on the council of the Conservative Way Forward (CWF) group. He is one of the leading British members of Le Cercle, a secretive foreign policy discussion forum. In contrast to most members of both CWF and Le Cercle, who hold pro-Republican Atlanticist views, he actively supported John Kerry in the US 2004 presidential election. This surprised some, but Duncan is a friend of Kerry, having met him while at Harvard.

Following the release of the Panama Papers, which contained revelations about David Cameron's income from overseas funds set up by his father, Duncan defended the Prime Minister. He urged Cameron's critics, especially MPs, to "admit that their real point is that they hate anyone who has got a hint of wealth in them" from whose viewpoint it followed that "we risk seeing a House of Commons which is stuffed full of low-achievers". Michael Deacon wrote in The Daily Telegraph: "There are two inferences to draw from Sir Alan's outburst. One is that he thinks the Commons should only be 'stuffed with' the rich. The second is that he thinks the vast majority of his constituents, not being rich, are 'low-achievers'. Probably not a view to advertise in his next election leaflet".

During the Gaza war, Duncan criticised Conservative Friends of Israel. Speaking on LBC in April 2024, he said that they had "been doing the bidding of Netanyahu, bypassing all proper processes of government to exercise undue influence at the top of government." Duncan added, "What you have is a lot of people now sitting around Rishi Sunak who are giving him appalling advice. Let's start with the head of CFI, who has been for many years Lord Polak. In my view, I think he should be removed from the Lords because he is exercising the interests of another country, not that of the parliament in which he sits, joined, I have to say, by Lord Pickles. They're the sort of the Laurel and Hardy who should be pushed out together." Polak, CFI's honorary president, is Jewish, while Pickles, the group's parliamentary chair, is not Jewish. The Jewish Leadership Council accused Duncan of sharing "antisemitic tropes", and the Board of Deputies of British Jews labelled his comments "disgraceful". The Conservative Party consequently began investigating him. On 16 July 2024, he was cleared of wrongdoing following an internal investigation. The Conservative Campaign Headquarters (CCHQ) investigation, which Duncan termed a "McCarthyite witch-hunt", found his comments were within political debate and not anti-semitic.

== Personal life ==
Duncan was the first sitting Conservative MP voluntarily to acknowledge that he is gay; he did this in an interview with The Times on 29 July 2002, although he has said that this came as no surprise to friends. Indeed, in an editorial published on the news of Duncan's coming out, The Daily Telegraph reported, "The news that Alan Duncan is gay will come as a surprise only to those who have never met him. The bantam Tory frontbencher can hardly be accused of having hidden his homosexuality."

On 3 March 2008, it was announced in the Court & Social page of The Daily Telegraph that Duncan would be entering into a civil partnership with his partner James Dunseath, which would make him the first member of either the Cabinet or the Shadow Cabinet to enter into a civil partnership. The two were joined as civil partners on 24 July 2008 at Merchant Taylors' Hall in the City of London.

Duncan had a following in the gay community and was active in speaking up for gay rights. He was responsible for formulating the Conservatives' policy response to the introduction of civil partnership legislation in 2004, which he considered his proudest achievement of the Parliament between 2001 and 2005. He was among those who rebelled against his party by voting for an equal age of consent between heterosexuals and homosexuals on numerous occasions between 1998 and 2000. He voted against same-sex adoption in 2001.

== Works and appearances ==
=== Books ===
Duncan is the author of three published nonfiction books:

- An End to Illusions (PDF). London: Demos. 1993. ISBN 1-898309-05-1. (economics)
- Duncan; Dominic Hobson (July 1995). Saturn's Children: How the State Devours Liberty, Prosperity and Virtue. London: Sinclair-Stevenson. ISBN 1-85619-605-4. (political science)
- In the Thick of It: The Private Diaries of a Minister. London: HarperCollins. 15 April 2021. ISBN 978-0-008-42226-4. (political memoir of 2016–2020)

His pamphlet An End to Illusions proposed an independent Bank of England, the break-up of clearing banks, reduction of implicit tax subsidies given to owner-occupiers, curtailment of pension fund tax privileges, and new forms of corporate ownership.

Saturn's Children presents a detailed case regarding the history and consequences of government control over institutions and activities which were historically private, to the extent that many citizens assume that privately or communally developed municipal facilities and universities are creations of the state, and that prohibitions on drug use, sex, and personal defence have always existed.

In the Thick of It is Duncan's diary from the eve of the Brexit referendum in 2016 to the UK's eventual exit from the EU. The book was serialised in the Daily Mail.

=== Television and radio ===
Duncan appeared four times on the satirical news quiz Have I Got News for You: first appearing on 28 October 2005, then 20 October 2006, and again on 2 May 2008 and 24 April 2009. His 2009 appearance featured a badly received ironic joke about murdering the latest Miss California, who stated that she opposed same-sex marriages. He appeared on many occasions as a panellist on BBC TV's Question Time and BBC Radio 4's Any Questions? In 2006, he took part in a documentary entitled How to beat Jeremy Paxman.

Parliament of the United Kingdom
Preceded by Michael Latham	Member of Parliament for Rutland and Melton; 1992–2019	Succeeded by Alicia Kearns
Political offices
Preceded by Gareth Thomas	Minister of State for International Development; 2010–2014	Succeeded by Desmond Swayne
Preceded by David Lidington as Minister of State for Europe	Minister of State for Europe and the Americas; 2016–2019	Succeeded by Chris Pincher
