= Juvenilization of poverty =

Processes by which children are at a higher risk for being poor

The term juvenilization of poverty is one used to describe the processes by which children are at a higher risk for being poor, suffer consistent and long-term negative effects due to deprivation (physical, mental, and psychological), and are disproportionately affected by systemic issues that perpetuate poverty. The term connotes not just the mere existence of child poverty but the increase in both relative and absolute measures of poverty among children as compared to both other vulnerable groups and the population at large.

Academic study of the juvenilization of poverty attempts to explain the methodical ways in which children are systematically disenfranchised by institutions, government welfare spending, and opportunities for health and wellness. Research also connects the juvenilization of poverty to overall trends in family structures, parental work, and economic supports for children and families. In particular, the juvenilization of poverty is closely linked to the "feminization of poverty", or the ways in which women worldwide are also disproportionately affected by poverty. Both terms – "juvenilization" and "feminization" – have been contested in political and academic discourse.

== History of the term ==
In the 1980s scholars and practitioners in the fields of public administration, sociology, and social work began noting a distressingly rapid rise in rates of juvenile poverty. This, after several decades of falling child poverty rates, with a low of about 15% in 1974, signaled to many a possible reversal in the gains made during the 1960s and 1970s for children's wellness.

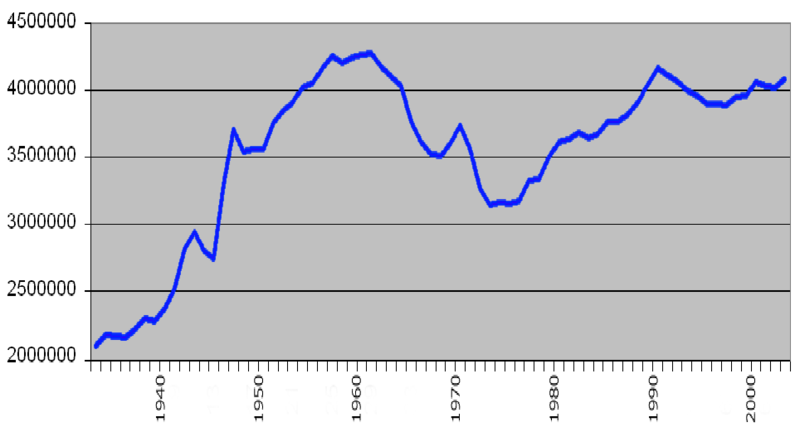
U.S. birth rate 1934–2004

A central aspect of concern was that juvenile poverty was rising in two-parent and single-parent mother homes, contrary to the perceived inherent stability of two-parent families. A 1989 article by Mary Jo Bane and David Ellwood linked changes in the labor market and declining male wages to rising child poverty trends, leading to further investigations of the connections between work, family structures, social services spending, and childhood welfare.

A population pyramid that shows the age of the population by sex from 1950 to 2010.

Also notable regarding the rise in juvenile poverty was the concurrent decrease in the rates of poverty among other vulnerable or "dependent" populations, specifically the elderly. In 1984 demographer Samuel Preston reported on several statistics that should have counter-indicated these trends. First a "sharp fertility decline" in the two decades after the 1957 postwar peak, matched with "a very rapid decline in old age mortality", should have indicated "favorable consequences for children and troubling ones for the elderly. In fact, he writes,

My thesis is that exactly the opposite trends have occurred in the relative well being of our two groups of age dependents and that demographic factors have not only failed to prevent this outcome but have, in many ways, encouraged it. Conditions have deteriorated for children and improved dramatically for the elderly...

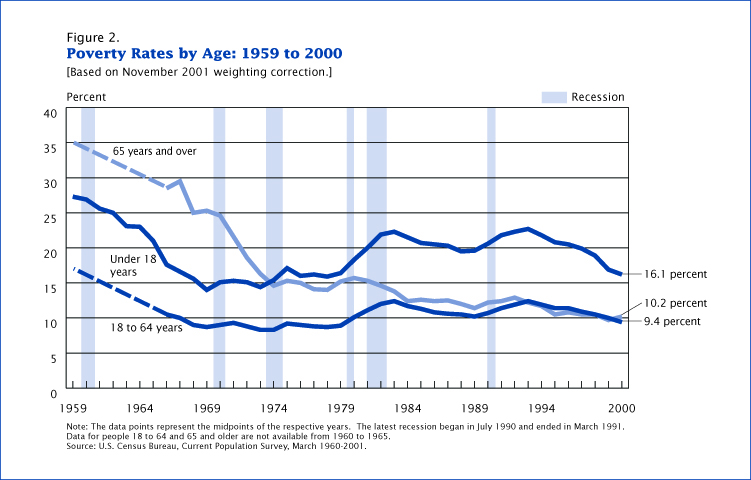

Considering these shifts and anomalous patterns of prosperity, the term "juvenilization of poverty" was coined to give name to the growing understanding the poverty was being increasingly and systematically born by children. The term, in both scholarship and practice, is used to elucidate ways in which children, even in times of economic gains and despite evidence seemingly to the contrary, are at a disproportionate risk of living in poverty.

== Trends in child poverty up to 2010 ==
Child poverty in the United States has fluctuated dramatically over time, usually in response to large-scale economic and political events. Estimates of juvenile poverty during the Great Depression judge that as many as 7 in 10 children, or 70% of all Americans under the age of 18, lived in poverty. The economic recovery afforded by World War II and post-war prosperity dramatically reduced both the number and percent of children living in impoverished homes.

Until the early 1960s however, no official, formalized national attempt was made to measure a standard poverty rate. In 1963, however, analyst Mollie Orshansky, a Social Security Administration researcher, worked to develop an official poverty threshold to standardize poverty measures.

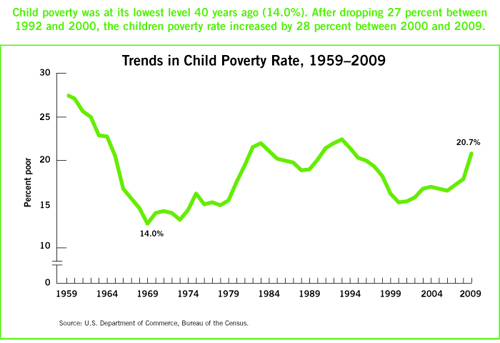
Trends in Child Poverty Rates in the US, 1959-2009

Still used today, the Orshansky Poverty Threshold is an absolute measure of poverty that uses as its basis a "minimally adequate food budget" for families of varying sizes, estimating that food costs required approximately one-third of a family's after-tax budget. Thus a family (of three or more) fell below the poverty threshold if their after-tax income is less than three times the "minimally adequate food budget". Despite some changes to the formula, this measure remains at the center of the official measures of absolute poverty.

Orshansky's calculations determined that in 1960 just under 30% of children lived in poverty. This rate continued to decline throughout the 1960s and 1970s due to a combination of economic growth, strong social welfare spending, and a robust labor market that increasingly included working mothers. Overall rates of child poverty reached a low in 1974 at, according to varying estimates, between 8-15%. However, in the last third of the 20th century child poverty rates among single parent (usually only a mother) and two-parent families began to surge.

This generally positive history of child poverty in the first two thirds of the 20th century belies, however, the variability of poverty rates for different subpopulations of children. Juvenile poverty varied both geographically and by racial subgroups. Despite overall gains, children of color were far more likely than White children to live in poverty. Certain regions, especially the south and some urban centers, also experienced high rates of concentrated poverty.

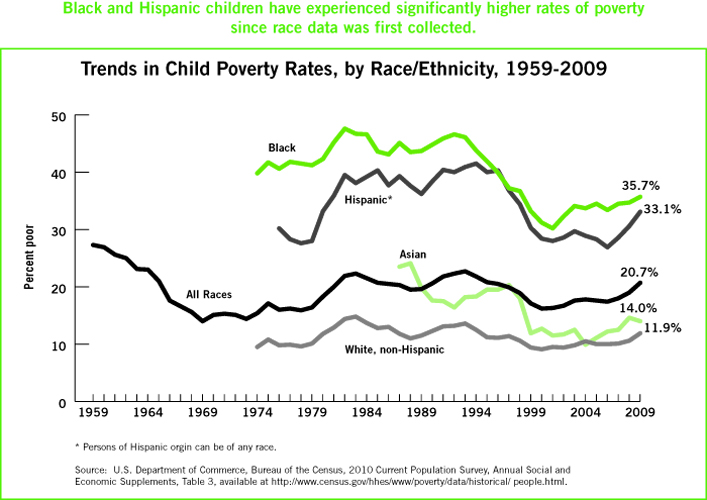
Child Poverty Rates, by Race/Ethnicity 1959-2010

Many of the causes for the juvenilization of poverty follow highly racialized affect patterns, meaning children of color are far more likely to suffer from poverty, both in the United States and internationally. Suzanne Bianchi finds that "between 1960 and 1991, the proportion of children living in mother-only families increased from 8 percent to 26 percent. The rise among black children living in mother-only families was much more pronounced than for white children. By 1991, 54 percent of black compared with 17 percent of white children lived only with their mother" (Bianchi 1991).

According to the most recent statistics from the National Center for Children in Poverty (NCCP) at Columbia University, about 51 million children, or 21% of the juvenile population of the United States, live "in families with incomes below the federal poverty level – $22,050 a year for a family of four".

The United States is one of the only nations that uses an absolute measure to determine poverty rates. In Europe and elsewhere best practices indicate that a relative measure of poverty is the best indicator of both proportional deprivation and comparable quality of life. Using a relative measure of poverty is considered a more accurate way of determining the economic stability of a group relative to both the general population and other comparable subpopulations. Using a relative measure to determine juvenile poverty rates requires setting a cutoff point – 60%, 50%, or 40% are standard measures – of average income, at which point a child or family is classified as poor. Relative measures of child poverty show that an even higher percentage of children in the US are impoverished, deepening the juvenilization of poverty.

The NCCP also writes that "Research shows, on average, families need an income of about twice that level to cover basic expenses. Using this standard, 42% of children live in low-income families".

According to the most recent statistics from the National Center for Children in Poverty (NCCP) at Columbia University, about 51 million children, or 21% of the juvenile population of the United States, live "in families with incomes below the federal poverty level – $22,050 a year for a family of four".

Using these calculations, the number of children currently living in poverty in the United States is between 1:5 and 2:5 children. A recent analysis of the 2010 US Census found that the number of poor children rose by 1 million in 2010, with nearly 1:5 American children now living in poverty. Either statistic, say advocates of child welfare, is far too high. They point to histories of the past 50 years and especially the past 20 years and make the claim that even in good economic eras and especially in bad ones, the effects of poverty have been disproportionately transferred to children.

=== Controversies ===
However, there is also a body of scholarship in response that questions the validity of these terms, finding that there has been neither an increase in women/child poverty nor a systematic project to transfer poverty to these populations. In particular, conservative researchers have argued that mismeasurement, inaccurate calculations, and inherent flaws in poverty data collection have overstated both child poverty rates and the juvenilization of poverty. Susan Mayer and Christopher Jencks write:

After a century of fairly steady decline, the official poverty rate among American children increased from 14.0 percent in 1969 to 19.6 percent in 1989, suggesting that the United States was losing its war on poverty. But once we correct various defects in the official poverty measure, our best estimate is that the proportion of children in households with incomes below the poverty line probably fell between 1969 and 1989 or between 1967 and 1991.

These scholars point instead to changes in family structures that have economic implications and welfare spending that attempts to ameliorate or offset poverty's effects. They cite increase access to medical care, improved living conditions, and higher percentages of children living in lower-crime areas as evidence that juvenile poverty is actually easing, rather than increasing.

== Causes of child poverty ==
The theory of a "juvenilization of poverty" rests on a notion that juvenile poverty is not just (too) high but increasing. Several categories of trends are cited as responsible for the systematic increase in juvenile poverty.

=== Changes in family structures ===
Social scientists frequently point to changes in family structure as one of the primary forces driving juvenile poverty. Of particular note are the increasing number of children living in unmarried or single-mother households. This factor is one of the reasons why the juvenilization of poverty is so closely linked to discussions of female poverty.

The rapid changes in family structure that began to occur in the 1960s and throughout the latter half of the 20th century had dramatic impacts on the financial realities of many women and children. During World War II and the decades succeeding it, many more women entered the workforce, divorce rates increased rapidly, and birth rates decreased. These shifts were both reactions to and reflections of massive shifts in the American economic, social, and cultural landscapes.

Studies show that single-parent households are far more likely to subsist below the poverty line. Some estimates say that children living in single parents homes are as much as four times as likely to live in poverty. Single parents must often support children on only one salary and must do so without the logistical and emotional support of another adult. Even when absent parents (in most cases, fathers) do pay child support, that income is less than what it would be if the parent was living with the family. As cases of single parent families rise, without commensurate increases in social welfare spending it is clearly predictable that more children will live in poverty.

Scholars of juvenile poverty are interested in not just the increase in single-mother homes but the changing demographics of single mothers and the implications this has for their children's welfare. In the decades between 1960 and the end of the 20th century not only were more single women heading families but the population demographics of those women was shifting rapidly. In the 1960–70s single mothers were far likelier to be older, divorced or widowed, and at least high school graduate with some work experience. As the century came to a close the age of single mothers was trending downwards, as were their levels of education and work experience. Single mothers were also increasingly more likely to be never-married. These statistics are especially predictive of juvenile poverty because never-married mothers, as compared to divorced or separated mothers, are frequently dependent on both family and social welfare; live in higher poverty, more disadvantaged neighborhoods; and are more likely to be unemployed or lacking in job skills. These trends indicate higher levels of poverty for a growing number of single mothers and, by extension, their children.

The scholarly and media attention paid to single mothers, in particular, has several implications. The first, and perhaps most politically charged, is the scrutiny placed on single mothers and their perceived failings as parents. Single mothers have been scrutinized both morally and economically, especially as the trends in "single" status changed over time. At the middle of the 20th century, the majority of single mothers were widowed while a small number were divorced or never-married. In the 1960s and 70s the number of divorced single parents rose exponentially. And throughout the last decades of the 20th century the number of never married mothers also continued to grow. Never-married single mothers, in particular, have been pathologized and their high rates of poverty seen by conservative forces as a product of their immorality and rejection of traditional family norms. This characterization is at the heart of pejorative labels like "welfare queen" that dominated political discussions of social spending and welfare programs for single mothers. Of very real concern, however, is the high rate of poverty experienced by children of never-married mothers. Bianchi writes that "two-thirds of children with a never-married mother live in poverty" (p. 100).

=== Changes in social welfare spending ===
At the same time that family dynamics in the United States were undergoing rapid and dramatic changes, so too was the social safety net changing in substantive ways. These changes are at the root, many believe, of the systematic project of transference of poverty onto families and children.

The social safety or welfare net is a patchwork of programs funded and administered by the jumbled forces of federal, state, local, and private or non-profit agencies. Thus far from being monolithic or unitary, the landscape of social programs is defined by loopholes, gaps in coverage, and conflicting or contradictory regulations.

Social safety net programs in the past 50 years have undergone changes in not just content but also type. The biggest shifts have been those that determine who receives support from the program. This involves both demographics (children, adults, seniors) and eligibility requirements. Eligibility for welfare programs can take many forms. In the simplest, all children would be eligible, by virtue of their age. This is the case with public school, for example. A more strenuous requirement is demonstrated need, as in the case with "transfer" benefits like welfare, Temporary Aid to Needy Families (TANF), food stamps, or housing subsidies.

Welfare reform during the Clinton Administration drastically altered the nature and extent of federal cash assistance to needy families. The central piece of legislative reform, known as the Personal Responsibility and Work Opportunity Reconciliation Act of 1996, instituted work requirement (or "workfare") and limited short term and lifetime benefits. The result was many more parents, primarily single mothers, pushed into low-wage work. In addition to the fundamental changes instituted to the distribution of cash assistance welfare, there has also been a slow but steady decline in their actual worth, as welfare assistance packages are not pegged to inflation or cost of living indexes.

Finally, of great concern in the juvenilization of poverty is the state (or in many cases, failure) of private transfers, mainly through child support. In her seminal 1978 work on the feminization of poverty Diane Pearce suggests that one of the primary causes of the feminization of poverty (and, by extension, juvenilization of poverty) is the failure of formal and informal mechanisms to insure reliable private transfers of support to mothers and children. Absent fathers earn less, on average, than present fathers and contribute far less to the support of dependent children.

=== Changes in labor markets ===
Of particular concern to those who study the juvenilization of poverty has been the rapid increase of poverty in two-parent homes. Two main issues – employment and wages – seem to be driving poverty for two-parent families, even in cases where both parents are employed.

Changes in the labor market have eliminated whole industries of labor, manufacturing, production jobs, often the type previously held by working-class parents. Low- or semi-skilled workers were hit hardest by the labor market restructuring of the 1970s and 1980s. Declining rates of unionization, lowered benefits, and fewer workplace compensations have had real effects in creating poor families.

Because of both the insufficient quantity of low-wage jobs and the failure of real wages to keep pace with inflation and rising living costs, many of these parents are among the ranks of the working poor. The risk of juvenile poverty is especially high for children of lower-educated, lower-skilled parents. There is additional evidence to suggest that this situation is steadily worsening especially for young families and those in the bottom economic quintile.

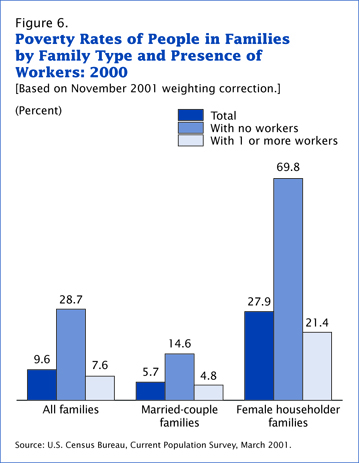

The scholarly and political emphasis on single motherhood often obscures discussion of the poverty that exists in two-parent families. While poverty is quite high in single-mother families, and seemingly quite persistent, poverty in two-parent homes is both prevalent and especially reactive to cycles and trends in the larger economy. Bane and Ellwood focus on this particular issue, writing that there is "a much lower, but highly variable, poverty rate among children in two-parent homes". (p. 1048) They write that industry changes and stagnant (low) real wages, rather than unemployment, lead to poverty in two-parent households. They raise the additional concern that financial stress may lead to the breakup of marriages and thus the deepening of child poverty.

== Long term effects ==
Material deprivation can have serious, lasting effects on children who grow up experiencing prolonged or periodic episodes of poverty. These effects may be seen both during their juvenile development and in their lives as adults.

There is a strong body of research that juvenile poverty has serious consequences for academic achievement. New research just released found that the achievement gap between poor and affluent families is actually greater than that between Whites and Blacks. Research suggests that many of the "out of school" factors associated with poverty have significant effects on daily classroom performance and overall educational attainment. It has also been shown that poor children lose time more over summer breaks when more affluent peers are traveling or involved in cultural enrichment activities.

Physically, poor children have far poorer health outcomes. Poor children are at a higher risk of low birthweight are more likely to die during the first month of their lives. Poor children are at far greater risk of going without health insurance and experience higher prevalence of chronic illness, lead poisoning and other environmental toxins, and accidental injury or death. Many poor children, especially infants, live in households that are "food insecure". Low access to proper and sufficient nutrition can lead to both impaired development and, perversely, obesity and a number of other weight-related illnesses such as type-2 diabetes. Some findings indicate that poor children, particularly Mexican-American children, are especially prone to low stature and higher rates of over-weight and obesity. Low birth-weight and malnutrition during childhood have been linked to low IQ, a higher prevalence of learning disabilities, and other social behavioral problems.

With regard to risking behaviors like youth sexual activity, smoking, and drug/alcohol use, there is some disagreement about the negative effects of juvenile impoverishment. One 1998 study found that "low income was not significant in increasing youth sexual activity and actually decreased the likelihood of youth drug and/or alcohol problems" but that spending time with fathers and parental oversight were correlated with reductions in both types of risk behaviors. Other studies indicate that poor youth are at a much higher risk for teen childbrearing, less positive peer relationships, and lower self-esteem.

Childhood poverty also has long term economic consequences. Research finds that children who experienced persistent poverty were far more likely to be poor adults than their non-poor peers. This childhood effect is not constant, however. Studies find that 33% of Black children who were poor during childhood remained so at ages 25–27, as compared with just 7% of White children.

== Anti-poverty programs for children ==
Research shows that there are some factors – both systematic programs and large cultural shifts – that may slow or ameliorate the juvenilization and feminization of poverty. Martha Ozawa finds that children benefit far more from means-tested, non-cash transfers such as Medicaid, food stamps, housing/rent subsidies, and free or reduced-price lunch. Children also benefit to a certain degree from means-testing cash transfers like Aid to Families with Dependent Children (AFDC), Supplemental Security Income (SSI), other public assistance payments, and certain veteran's benefits that may "trickle down" to the child from their parent or guardian.

One major factor, however, in the juvenilization of poverty has been the shift in the type of benefits regularly available to the poor in the US. Since the mid-1970s the federal government has been increasingly shifting funding from public assistance programs to those that can be classified as "social assurance". Danziger and Stern write that "Most of the increased Federal social spending over the past 25 year [in 1990] is accounted for by the expansion and indexation of social security benefits and the introduction and expansion of Medicare, Medicaid, and the Supplemental Security Income program, all of which provide benefits disproportionally[sic] to the elderly".

Conversely, some factors may actually be working to stem the tide specifically of feminized poverty. Increased female labor force participation with more commiserate wages, combined with higher levels of female educational attainment both help to bolster the economic position of American children, especially in female-headed households. Due to these factors there may actually be a slight reversal in the trend towards feminization, but probably only for employed, more highly educated women.

== Child poverty in comparative perspective ==
Reports show that child poverty persists at high rates in even very rich countries. It is in these contexts that the juvenilization of poverty arguments are most applicable, as child poverty exists not just alongside or concurrently with other types of poverty but within rich societies and despite or even because of poverty reduction among other groups of citizens.

A 2000 report by the United Nations shows that absolute child poverty was variable internationally but still quite high in many developed countries.

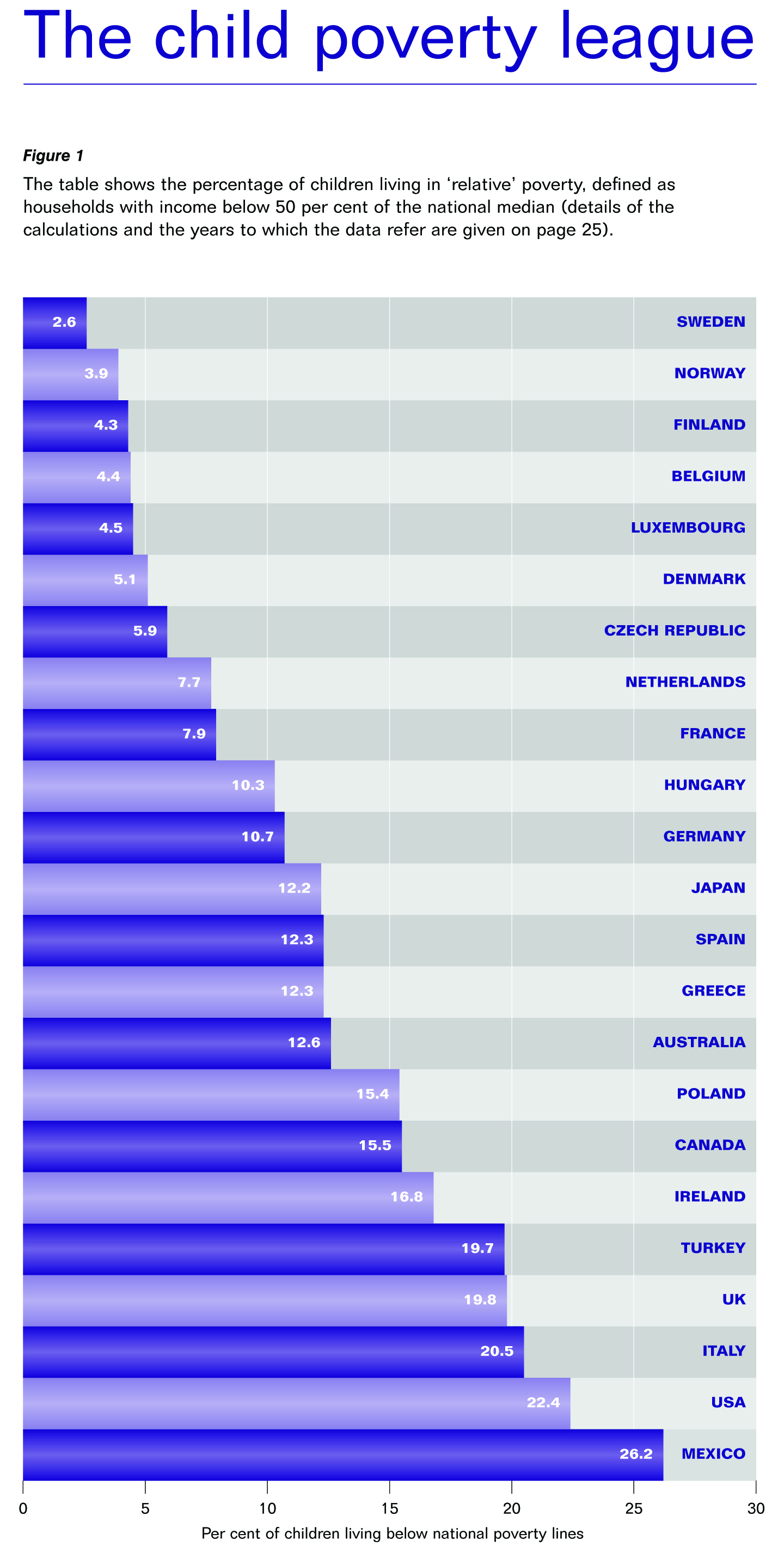
Percentage of Children Internationally Living in Relative Poverty

Other nations take a very different approach to preventing or eliminating child poverty. In France and other European countries spending on child welfare and family support programs represents a much higher percentage of the GDP (as compared to the United States) and far outweighs spending on other major programs like military defense. In addition, many European countries offer far more comprehensive transfer packages for insuring that after-tax incomes of working families does not fall below a relative poverty line.

Thus while child poverty exists globally and around the world children suffer disproportionally from material deprivation, the juvenilization of poverty argument is most politically salient in rich countries. It is in these nations with thriving economies that, say child welfare advocates, wealth has been systematically siphoned away from children and families.

== See also ==
- Child poverty
- Feminization of poverty
- Poverty in the United States
- Working poor
