= Michael Latham =

British politician (1942–2017)

Michael Latham DL FCGI HonFREng Hon FRIBA

Member of Parliament for Rutland and Melton
- In office 9 June 1983 – 16 March 1992
- Preceded by: Constituency established
- Succeeded by: Alan Duncan

Member of Parliament for Melton
- In office 28 February 1974 – 13 May 1983
- Preceded by: Mervyn Pike
- Succeeded by: Constituency abolished

Personal details
- Born: Michael Anthony Latham; 20 November 1942
- Died: 2 November 2017 (aged 74)

Sir Michael Anthony Latham (20 November 1942 – 2 November 2017) was a British Conservative Member of Parliament.

== Political career ==
Latham was educated at Marlborough and King's College, Cambridge, where he joined the Cambridge University Conservative Association and was awarded a history degree with first-class honours in 1964. Before entering Parliament, he was a Housing and Local Government Officer for the Conservative Research Department (1965–67), Parliamentary Liaison Officer for the National Federation of Building Trades Employers (1967–73), and Director of the House Builders Federation (1971–73).

Latham's first foray into politics came when he was elected to the Churchill Ward on Westminster City Council in 1968. He served for three years, standing down at the subsequent election in 1971. Having unsuccessfully contested Liverpool West Derby at the 1970 general election, he was elected the Conservative MP for Melton in February 1974. In 1983, following boundary changes, Latham was elected to represent Rutland and Melton, before standing down in 1992. Described by the Daily Telegraph as "slightly to the Left of the party", Latham was a loyalist backbencher who nevertheless rebelled over the Community Charge (describing it as "a useless, half-baked and regressive alternative to the rating system") and NHS dental and optical charges. As befitted a man of his occupational background, his main interest in Parliament was housebuilding.

== After Parliament ==
In 1994, he wrote the influential joint government and industry report on the UK construction industry, 'Constructing the Team' (known as the Latham Report). In it he advocated partnerships within the fragmented and highly contentious construction industry. He made recommendations as to how conflict could be minimised within the industry. Such was the nature and extent of these recommendations that Mr Justice Jackson later described the report as "the whirlwind which hit the construction industry".

In 1997, he was elected an honorary Fellow of the Royal Academy of Engineering.

After standing down from parliament he has held numerous positions in the construction industry including chairman of the Construction Industry Training Board (2002–10), chairman of ConstructionSkills (2003–10), chairman, then deputy chairman of Willmott Dixon Limited (1999–2002, 2002–09), chairman of Collaborative Working Centre Limited (since 2003) and deputy chairman of BIW Technologies (2000–05).

Latham was knighted in the 1993 New Year Honours for political service. He was also an FRSA, FCGI, Hon. RICS, Hon. FRIBA, Hon. FCIOB and Hon. FICE.
