= Alicia Kearns =

British politician (born 1987)

Alicia Kearns MP
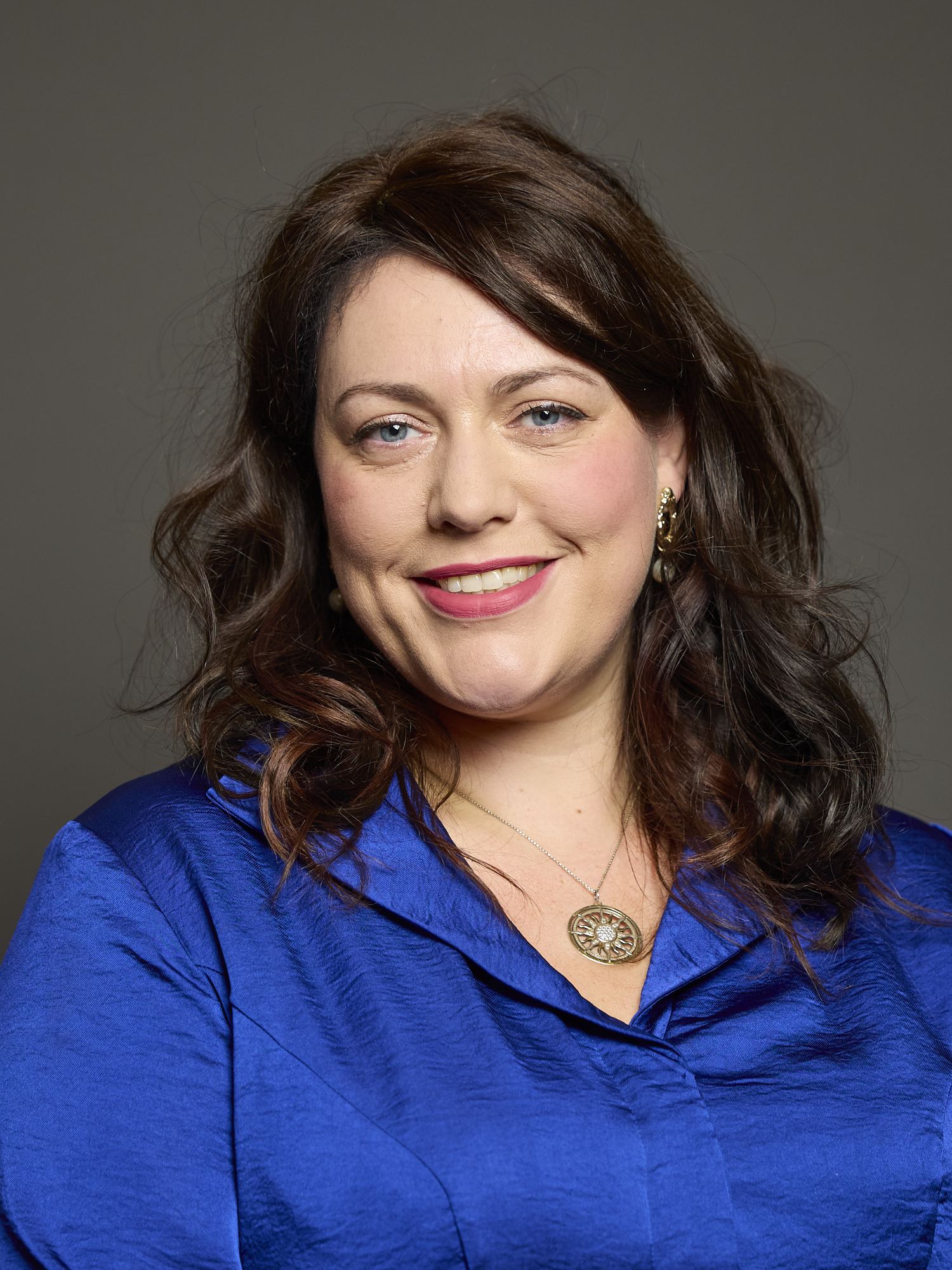
- Official portrait, 2024

Shadow Minister for Home Affairs
- Incumbent
- Assumed office 2 November 2024
- Leader: Kemi Badenoch
- Preceded by: Tom Tugendhat

Shadow Minister for Foreign Affairs
- Incumbent
- Assumed office 2 September 2026
- Leader: Kemi Badenoch
- Preceded by: Andrew Rosindell
- In office 19 July 2024 – 2 November 2024
- Leader: Rishi Sunak
- Preceded by: Stephen Doughty
- Succeeded by: Andrew Rosindell

Chair of the Foreign Affairs Select Committee
- In office 12 October 2022 – 30 May 2024
- Preceded by: Tom Tugendhat
- Succeeded by: Emily Thornberry

Member of Parliament for Rutland and Stamford Rutland and Melton (2019–2024)
- Incumbent
- Assumed office 12 December 2019
- Preceded by: Alan Duncan
- Majority: 10,394 (21.4%)

Personal details
- Born: Alicia Alexandra Martha Kearns; 11 November 1987 (age 38) England
- Party: Conservative
- Children: 3
- Education: Fitzwilliam College, Cambridge (BA)
- Website: Official website

Alicia Alexandra Martha Kearns (born 11 November 1987) is a British Conservative Party politician who has been the Member of Parliament (MP) for Rutland and Stamford, previously Rutland and Melton, since 2019 and Shadow Minister for Home Affairs since November 2024. She identifies ideologically as a one-nation conservative.

In October 2022, Kearns was elected Chair of the Foreign Affairs Select Committee. She is the first woman to ever be elected to the role, and the youngest ever female Chair of a Select Committee.

== Early life and career ==
Alicia Kearns was born on 11 November 1987 and grew up in Cambridgeshire, where she attended a comprehensive school, Impington Village College. During her teenage years, she was a member of the UK Youth Parliament and an activist for Amnesty International. She studied social and political sciences at Fitzwilliam College, Cambridge, graduating in 2009. During university, she participated in student theatre productions.

Kearns has worked in communication roles at the Ministry of Defence (MOD), Ministry of Justice (MoJ), and the Foreign and Commonwealth Office (FCO). She was the lead press officer for the MOD's contribution to the 2014 Scottish independence referendum campaign. She led the government's communication campaigns in Syria and Iraq for the FCO. At the FCO she was responsible for advising governments on strategies to defeat Daesh (ISIS), insurgent groups, and to counter Russian disinformation in Syria. She attended the UN-led peace talks on Syria and was deployed in Iraq, Kuwait and Ukraine. At the MoJ, she worked as the Victims' Minister's press secretary.

Kearns became the client services director for the strategic communications consultancy Global Influence in 2016. She later became an independent consultant. Her private sector duties involved designing and directing "counter violent extremism, counter disinformation, hybrid warfare and behaviour change programmes for Governments, militaries, and NGOs to build stronger and safer communities".

Immediately prior to her election to parliament, Kearns was directing counter-terrorism, counter disinformation and hybrid warfare interventions in Lebanon, Morocco and the Western Balkans.

Kearns stood for election at the 2017 general election in the safe Labour seat of Mitcham and Morden. She came second behind the incumbent Labour MP Siobhain McDonagh with 24.2% of the vote.

Kearns was also in the final shortlist in the same election for the safe Conservative seat of Chelmsford but lost the selection to then-MEP Vicky Ford.

== Parliamentary career ==
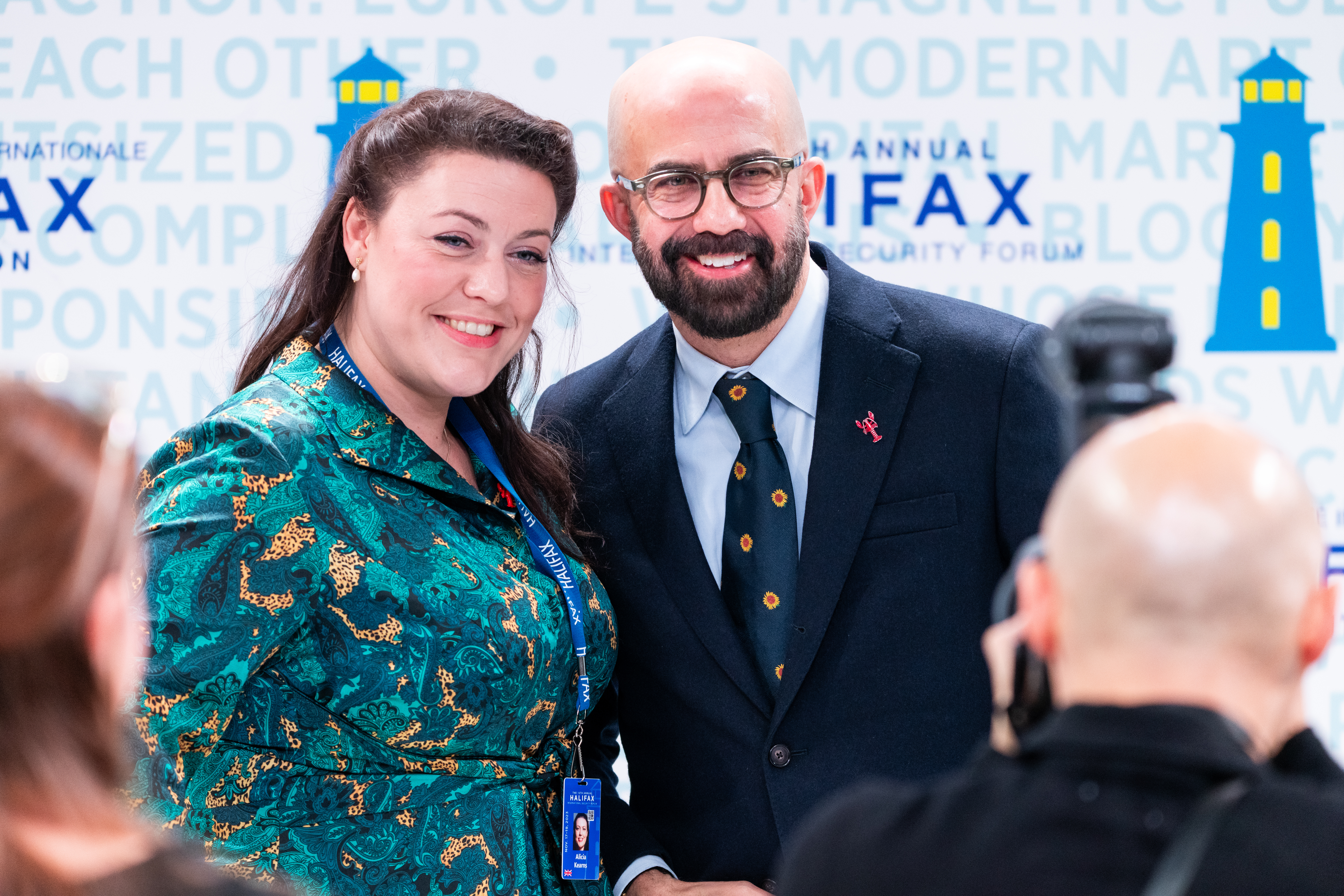
Kearns at the Halifax International Security Forum in 2023

Kearns was selected as the Conservative candidate for Rutland and Melton on 8 November 2019. It is a notionally safe Conservative seat, having been represented by a member of the party since the constituency's creation in 1983. She was elected at the 2019 general election with a majority of 26,924 and 62.6% of the vote.

Some newspapers and broadcasters alleged that Kearns was part of an attempt by Conservative MPs elected in the 2019 general election to oust then Prime Minister Boris Johnson over Partygate in January 2022. She said that she met with concerned MPs, but denied leading a rebellion against Johnson, stating that "I make no apology for meeting with my colleagues, but it was not a coup or any such activity despite the mischief of the media or certain actors who might wish to suggest otherwise."

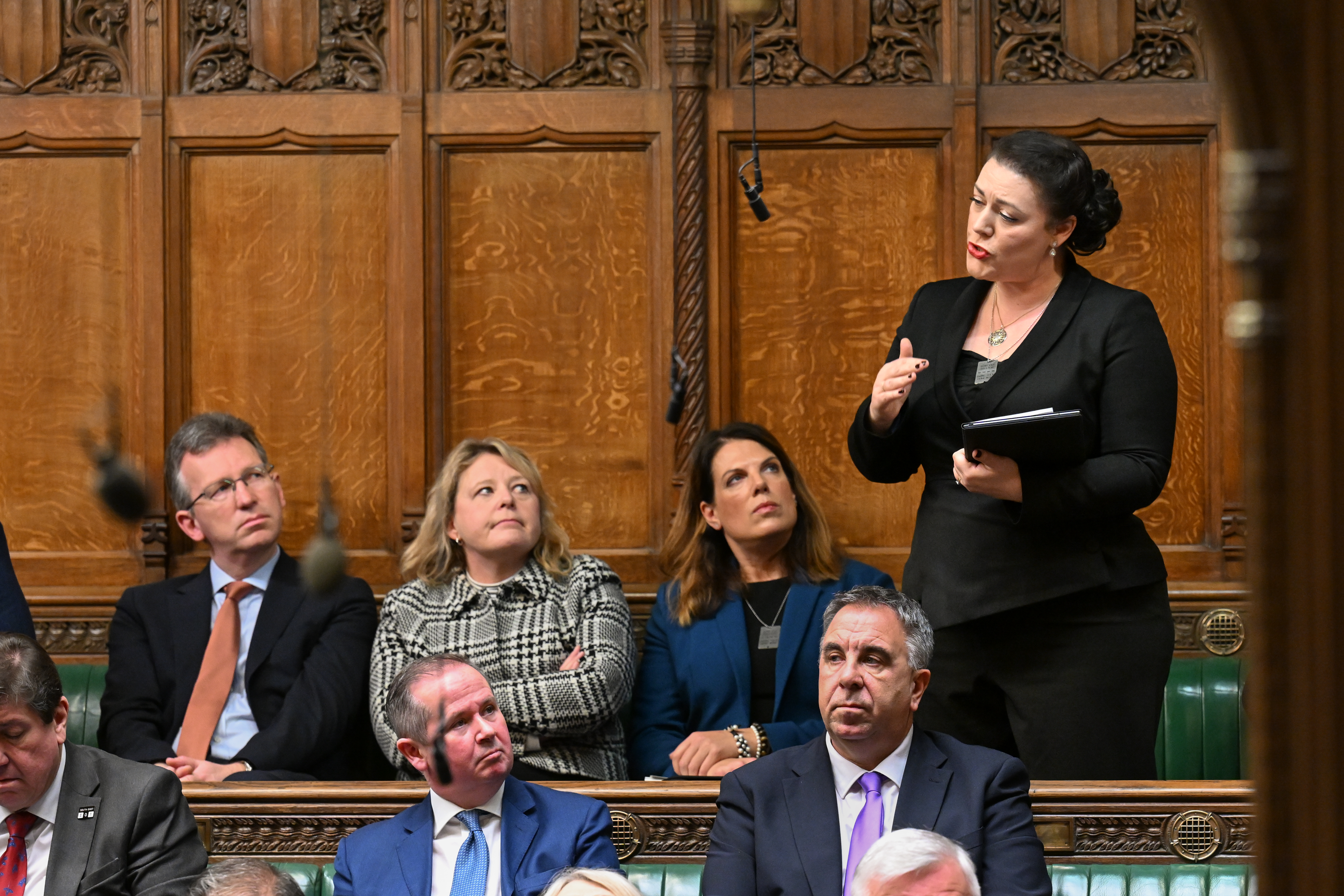
Kearns speaking during Prime Minister's Questions, 7 February 2024

Kearns was a member of the Foreign Affairs Select Committee from March 2020 until May 2024. She is also on the steering committee of the China Research Group. On 12 October 2022, she was elected as the first female Chair of the Foreign Affairs Select Committee, replacing Tom Tugendhat, and the youngest ever female Chair of any Committee. As a chair of a select committee she was also a member of the Liaison Committee.

In July 2023, Kearns claimed in parliament that weapons were being smuggled from Serbia to Kosovo in ambulances and then being stored in Serbian Orthodox Churches. NATO's peacekeeping mission in Kosovo, KFOR, said it had no evidence for the smuggling claims. The British Ambassador to Kosovo, Nicholas Abbott, said the British government had no evidence to support Kearns' allegation. A few months later, on 24 September 2023, Kearns' warnings were noted after the Banjska attack in September 2023, in which an armed Serb group killed a Kosovo police officer and occupied a Serbian Orthodox monastery.

Kearns ran a successful campaign during the COVID-19 pandemic to end the lone birth scandal which saw NHS guidance force women to give birth, or labour until the late stages, and undergo miscarriages, without their partners due to efforts to prevent the spread of COVID.

Due to the 2023 Periodic Review of Westminster constituencies, Kearns' constituency of Rutland and Melton was abolished, and replaced with Rutland and Stamford. At the 2024 general election, Kearns was elected to Parliament as MP for Rutland and Stamford with 43.7% of the vote and a majority of 10,394.

In 2023 Kearns worked with local residents on a campaign that led to the adoption of the Flag of Leicestershire.

Kearns has been a staunch opponent of the 4.2 miles (6.8 km) Mallard Pass Solar Farm, which straddles Lincolnshire and Rutland, and aims to provide renewable energy to 92,000 homes.

Kearns is a supporter of transgender rights and in August 2020 co-authored an article in ConservativeHome with fellow MP Nicola Richards which called on the government to reform the Gender Recognition Act 2004.

In April 2024, one of Kearns' former parliamentary aides, Christopher Cash, and his associate Christopher Berry were charged under the Official Secrets Act 1911 for allegedly spying for China, through their access to parliamentary information. In September 2025 the charges were dropped less than a month before the trial was due to start, because the "evidential standard" was not met. Kearns would have been a key witness at the trial.

In July 2024, Kearns was one of five politicians to cover for James O'Brien's radio show on LBC, as part of the station's "Guest Week".

In February 2025, following U.S. President Donald Trump's criticism of Ukrainian President Volodymyr Zelenskyy during his U.S. visit, Kearns demanded that Prime Minister Keir Starmer cancel Trump's upcoming state visit to the United Kingdom.

== Personal life ==
Kearns lives in the village of Langham in Rutland with her husband. The couple have a son and two daughters.

Kearns was public about her health challenges with her third child; she suffered from placenta praevia and placenta accreta spectrum, requiring a hysterectomy immediately following the birth of her child.

Parliament of the United Kingdom
| Preceded by Sir Alan Duncan | Member of Parliament for Rutland and Melton; 2019–2024 | Constituency abolished |
| New constituency | Member of Parliament for Rutland and Stamford; 2024–present | Incumbent |
