= Rutland and Melton =

UK Parliament constituency (1983–2024)

Coordinates: 52.7°N 0.8°W

- Former county constituency for the House of Commons
- Boundary of Rutland and Melton in Rutland and Leicestershire for the 2019 general election

- Location of Rutland and Leicestershire within England
- County: 1983–1997 Leicestershire; 1997–present Leicestershire and Rutland
- Electorate: 77,324 (December 2010)
- Major settlements: Melton Mowbray, Oakham and Uppingham

1983–2024
- Seats: One
- Created from: Rutland and Stamford, and Melton
- Replaced by: Rutland and Stamford, and Melton and Syston

Rutland and Melton was a county constituency spanning Leicestershire and Rutland, represented in the House of Commons of the Parliament of the United Kingdom from 1983 to 2024. It elected one Member of Parliament (MP) by the first-past-the-post system of election. For its entire existence, the seat elected members of the Conservative Party.

== History ==
The constituency was created in 1983 from the former seats of Rutland and Stamford and Melton. Initially, it covered all of Rutland and Melton borough and part of Charnwood. A boundary change implemented in 1997 saw the area of Charnwood replaced with part of Harborough district up to the boundary of the city of Leicester (for example Scraptoft).

The constituency was considered a safe Conservative seat throughout its existence, electing a Conservative with a significant margin even with the 1997 national swing towards the Labour Party. Sir Alan Duncan held the seat from 1992 to 2019, when he was replaced by Alicia Kearns.

Further to the 2023 Periodic Review of Westminster constituencies, the seat was abolished for the 2024 general election, with its contents distributed as follows:

- The Borough of Melton to the newly created seat of Melton and Syston
- The County of Rutland and the parts in Harborough District, including Thurnby, to the re-established seat of Rutland and Stamford

== Boundaries ==
Map of boundaries 2010–2024

1983–1997: The district of Rutland, the Borough of Melton, and the borough of Charnwood wards of East Goscote, Queniborough, Six Hills, Syston, and Thurmaston.

1997–2010: The county of Rutland, the Borough of Melton, and the District of Harborough wards of Billesdon, Easton, Houghton, Scraptoft, Thurnby, and Tilton.

2010–2024: The county of Rutland, the Borough of Melton, and the District of Harborough wards of Billesdon, Nevill, Thurnby and Houghton, and Tilton.

== Members of Parliament ==
Election	Member	Party
1983	Michael Latham	Conservative
1992	Sir Alan Duncan	Conservative
2019	Alicia Kearns	Conservative

== Elections ==
=== Elections in the 2010s ===
General election 2019: Rutland and Melton
Party	Candidate	Votes	%	±%
Conservative	Alicia Kearns	36,507	62.6	−0.2
Labour	Andy Thomas	9,583	16.4	−6.3
Liberal Democrats	Carol Weaver	7,970	13.7	+5.5
Green	Alastair McQuillan	2,875	4.9	+1.9
UKIP	Marietta King	917	1.6	−1.7
Independent	Anthony Watchorn (Note: Watchorn died on 26 November 2019 during the election campaign.)	458	0.8	New
Majority		26,924	46.2	+6.1
Turnout		58,310	70.5	−2.9
Conservative hold		Swing	+3.0	

General election 2017: Rutland and Melton
Party	Candidate	Votes	%	±%
Conservative	Alan Duncan	36,169	62.8	+7.2
Labour	Heather Peto	13,065	22.7	+7.3
Liberal Democrats	Ed Reynolds	4,711	8.2	+0.1
UKIP	John Scutter	1,869	3.2	−12.7
Green	Alastair McQuillan	1,755	3.0	−1.3
Majority		23,104	40.1	+0.4
Turnout		57,569	73.4	+5.0
Conservative hold		Swing	-0.05	

General election 2015: Rutland and Melton
Party	Candidate	Votes	%	±%
Conservative	Alan Duncan	30,383	55.6	+4.4
UKIP	Richard Billington	8,678	15.9	+11.3
Labour	James Moore	8,383	15.4	+1.2
Liberal Democrats	Ed Reynolds	4,407	8.1	−17.7
Green	Alastair McQuillan	2,325	4.3	New
Independent	Marilyn Gordon	427	0.8	New
Majority		21,705	39.7	+14.3
Turnout		54,603	68.4	−3.3
Conservative hold		Swing	−3.4	

General election 2010: Rutland and Melton
Party	Candidate	Votes	%	±%
Conservative	Alan Duncan	28,228	51.2	±0.0
Liberal Democrats	Grahame Hudson	14,228	25.8	+7.2
Labour	John Morgan	7,839	14.2	−10.8
UKIP	Peter Baker	2,526	4.6	+1.4
BNP	Keith Addison	1,757	3.2	New
Independent	Leigh Higgins	588	1.1	New
Majority		14,000	25.4	−0.8
Turnout		55,166	71.7	+6.7
Conservative hold		Swing	−3.6	

=== Elections in the 2000s ===
General election 2005: Rutland and Melton
Party	Candidate	Votes	%	±%
Conservative	Alan Duncan	25,237	51.2	+3.1
Labour	Linda Arnold	12,307	25.0	−4.8
Liberal Democrats	Grahame Hudson	9,153	18.6	+0.8
UKIP	Peter Baker	1,554	3.2	+0.6
Veritas	Duncan Shelley	696	1.4	New
Independent	Helen Pender	337	0.7	New
Majority		12,930	26.2	+7.9
Turnout		49,284	65.0	+0.8
Conservative hold		Swing	+4.0	

General election 2001: Rutland and Melton
Party	Candidate	Votes	%	±%
Conservative	Alan Duncan	22,621	48.1	+2.3
Labour	Matthew O'Callaghan	14,009	29.8	+0.8
Liberal Democrats	Kim Lee	8,386	17.8	−1.4
UKIP	Peter Baker	1,223	2.6	+1.0
Green	Chris Davies	817	1.7	New
Majority		8,612	18.3	+1.5
Turnout		47,056	64.2	−10.8
Conservative hold		Swing	+0.8	

=== Elections in the 1990s ===
General election 1997: Rutland and Melton (Note: The 1997 election result is calculated relative to the notional, not the actual, 1992 result.)
Party	Candidate	Votes	%	±%
Conservative	Alan Duncan	24,107	45.8	−15.6
Labour	John Meads	15,271	29.0	+13.3
Liberal Democrats	Kim Lee	10,112	19.2	−1.6
Referendum	Rupert King	2,317	4.4	New
UKIP	Jeff Abbott	823	1.6	New
Majority		8,836	16.8	−23.8
Turnout		52,630	75.0	−5.2
Conservative hold		Swing	-14.5	

General election 1992: Rutland and Melton
Party	Candidate	Votes	%	±%
Conservative	Alan Duncan	38,603	59.0	−3.0
Labour	Joan Taylor	13,068	20.0	+5.5
Liberal Democrats	Richard Lustig	12,682	19.4	−4.1
Green	Jim Berreen	861	1.3	New
Natural Law	R Gray	237	0.4	New
Majority		25,535	39.0	+0.5
Turnout		65,451	80.8	+4.0
Conservative hold		Swing	−4.2	

=== Elections in the 1980s ===
General election 1987: Rutland and Melton
Party	Candidate	Votes	%	±%
Conservative	Michael Latham	37,073	62.0	+0.6
Liberal	Robert Renold	14,051	23.5	−3.6
Labour	Leslie Burke	8,680	14.5	+2.9
Majority		23,022	38.5	+5.2
Turnout		59,804	76.8	+3.5
Conservative hold		Swing		

General election 1983: Rutland and Melton
Party	Candidate	Votes	%	±%
Conservative	Michael Latham	33,262	60.4	
Liberal	David Farrer	14,909	27.1	
Labour	John Whitby	6,414	11.6	
Ecology	Heather Goddard	532	1.0	
Majority		18,353	33.3	
Turnout		59,804	73.3	
Conservative win (new seat)				

== See also ==
- List of parliamentary constituencies in Leicestershire and Rutland
