= Saturn's Children (Duncan and Hobson book) =

1995 political science work

Saturn's Children: How the State Devours Liberty, Prosperity and Virtue
- Front cover of the hardback edition, depicting Saturn Devouring His Son
- Author: Alan Duncan and Dominic Hobson
- Cover artist: Francisco Goya
- Language: English
- Genre: Political science
- Publisher: Sinclair-Stevenson
- Publication date: July 1995
- Publication place: United Kingdom
- Pages: 400 pp
- ISBN: 1-85619-605-4
- OCLC: 33013171

Saturn’s Children: How the State Devours Liberty, Prosperity and Virtue is a political science book by Alan Duncan and Dominic Hobson. Its main thesis is that states (in particular, the United Kingdom, on which the book concentrates) expropriate private property, eliminate personal liberties, and undermine the material well-being of the people.

Its title refers to the Roman myth that Saturn, fearing his children usurping him, ate them at birth. The front cover of the hardback edition features Saturn Devouring His Son, a painting by Francisco Goya portraying the myth.

== Controversy ==
The book courted political controversy due to Alan Duncan's role as a Conservative MP and Parliamentary Private Secretary to the Chairman of the Conservative Party, Brian Mawhinney. As a consequence, many of the book's stridently libertarian messages disagreed with the position of Duncan's party, which, at the time, was suffering considerable internal divisions, culminating in a leadership contest in 1995.

Perhaps the most controversial of the policies advocated in the book was the position taken that all drugs, currently controlled under the Misuse of Drugs Act 1971, should be legally available to the public. When the book was published in paperback, this chapter was omitted. Not wanting to hide his views, Duncan at one time posted the offending chapter on his official website, "for the benefit of the enquiring student".
