= Infrastructure Lifecycle Management =

Infrastructure Lifecycle Management (ILM) is a term coined by the real estate sector. It covers the management of all core processes around planning, construction, operation, maintenance and commercialization of buildings or property. The life cycle of a real estate property starts with the planning and realization phase, carries on with the commercial usage and facility management and is finalized by the demolition, dismantling or conversion of the property.
