= Participation (ownership) =

In finance, "participation" is an ownership interest in a mortgage or other loan. In particular, loan participation is a cooperation of multiple lenders to issue a loan (known as participation loan) to one borrower. This is usually done in order to reduce individual risks of the lenders.

The term is also used as a synonym to profit sharing, an incentive whereby employees of a company receive a share of the profits of the company.
