= Extranet =

Controlled private network

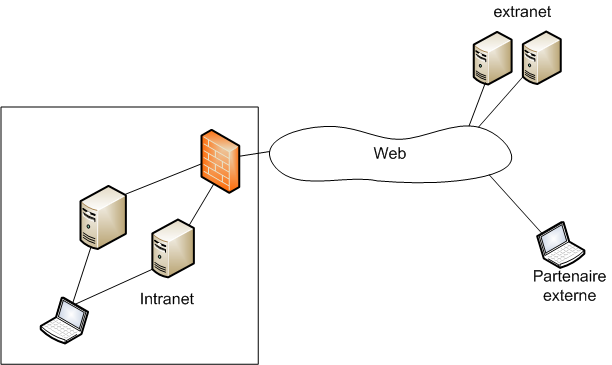
A diagram showing an extranet and how it relates to an intranet and the Internet.

An extranet is a controlled private computer network that allows communication with business partners, vendors and suppliers, or an authorized set of customers. It extends an intranet to trusted outsiders. It provides access to needed services for authorized parties, without granting access to an organization's entire network. It can be implemented securely, either with dedicated links or as a VPN.

== Enterprise applications ==
During the late 1990s and early 2000s, several industries started to use the term "extranet" to describe centralized repositories of shared data (and supporting applications) made accessible via the web only to authorized members of particular work groups -- for example, geographically dispersed, multi-company project teams. Some applications are offered on a software as a service (SaaS) basis.

For example, in the construction industry, project teams may access a project extranet to share drawings, photographs and documents, and use online applications to mark up and make comments and to manage and report on project-related communications. In 2003 in the United Kingdom, several of the leading vendors formed the Network for Construction Collaboration Technology Providers (NCCTP) to promote the technologies and to establish data exchange standards between the different data systems. The same type of construction-focused technologies have also been developed in the United States, Australia and mainland Europe.

== Advantages ==
- Exchange large volumes of data using Electronic Data Interchange (EDI)
- Share product catalogs exclusively with trade partners
- Collaborate with other companies on joint development efforts
- Jointly develop and use training programs with other companies
- Provide or access services provided by one company to a group of other companies, such as an online banking application managed by one company on behalf of affiliated banks
- Improved efficiency: since customers are satisfied with the information provided, it can be an advantage for the organization, potentially attracting more customers and increasing efficiency.

== Disadvantages ==
- Extranets can be expensive to implement and maintain within an organization (e.g., hardware, software, employee training costs), if hosted internally rather than by an application service provider.
- Security of extranets can be a concern when hosting valuable or proprietary information.
- Partner and customer access may result in contentious or controversial debates.

== See also ==
- LAN
- List of collaborative software
- Wide area network
