= Great Smoky Mountains Study =

The Great Smoky Mountains Study is a longitudinal study led by William Copeland (professor) from Duke University Medical Center that started in 1993 and ended in 2003. It followed 1,420 children from western North Carolina. Participants were interviewed at up to nine points in time - first aged 9 to 16, and again at ages 19–21.

Four years into the study, about one quarter of the families saw a dramatic and unexpected increase in income. They were members of the Eastern Band of Cherokee Indians, and a casino had just been built on the reservation. From that point on every tribal citizen earned a share of the profits (about $4,000/yr per person). The study showed that among these children, instances of behavioral and emotional disorders decreased, and conscientiousness and agreeableness increased. Randall Akee remarked that "It would be almost impossible to replicate this kind of longitudinal study”.
