= Global Monitoring Report (World Bank) =

The Global Monitoring Report was a joint World Bank and International Monetary Fund report that monitored how the world is doing in implementing the policies and actions for achieving the Millennium Development Goals (MDGs) and related development outcomes. Published annually since 2006, the report was discontinued in 2016.

== Poverty forecasts ==
The October 2015 report notes that just over 900 million people (12.8 percent of the world population) were living in extreme poverty (less than $1.90 a day) in 2012, compared with 987 million (14.2 percent of the world population) in 2011. It also projects that by 2015 less than 10% of the world's population will fall under the poverty line.

The October 2015 report revised the official poverty line to $1.90 a day, from $1.25 previously.

The following tables show that Sub-Saharan Africa has the highest percentage of extreme poverty, with 42.6% of its population living below $1.90 a day. Poverty rates are projected to decline in this region through 2030, but remain at very high levels.

Share of population below US$1.90 a day (2011 ppp)
Region	1990	1999	2011	2012	2015p
East Asia and Pacific	60.6	37.5	8.5	7.2	4.1
Eastern Europe and Central Asia	1.9	7.8	2.4	2.1	1.7
Latin America and the Caribbean	17.8	13.9	5.9	5.6	5.6
Middle East and North Africa	6.0	4.2	-	-	-
South Asia	50.6	41.8	22.2	18.8	13.5
Sub-Saharan Africa	56.8	58.0	44.4	42.7	35.2
Developing world	44.4	34.3	16.5	14.9	11.9
World	37.1	29.1	14.1	12.7	9.6

Millions of people below US$1.90 a day (2011 ppp)
Region	1990	1999	2011	2012	2015p
East Asia and Pacific	995.5	689.4	173.1	147.2	82.6
Eastern Europe and Central Asia	8.8	36.8	11.4	10.1	4.4
Latin America and the Caribbean	78.2	71.1	35.3	33.7	29.7
Middle East and North Africa	13.5	11.3	-	-	-
South Asia	574.6	568.0	361.7	309.2	231.3
Sub-Saharan Africa	287.6	374.6	393.6	388.8	347.1
World	1,958.6	1,751.5	983.3	896.7	702.1

The World Bank forecasts receive extensive media coverage.

== See also ==
- World Economic Outlook (a similar IMF publication)
