= Relational poverty =

Human Social Isolation

Relational poverty is the idea that societal poverty exists if there is a lack of human relationships. One can have impaired relations with individuals in various degrees of severity. Relational poverty can be the result of a lost contact number, lack of phone ownership, isolation, or deliberate severing of ties with an individual or community. The importance of social relationships in people's lives is non-negotiable.

Relational poverty is also understood "by the social institutions that organize those relationships ... poverty is importantly the result of the different terms and conditions on which people are included in social life".

== Overview ==
Studies of relational poverty have been analyzed throughout the 2000s. Mosse, Hickey, Watkins, Scram, and O'Connor have all published significant findings and further defined the term. Lawson and Elwood's 2018 work creates a more politicized definition to relational poverty stating "relational poverty work explores how poverty is produced in the inseparable interplay of institutional rules and practices; processes of meaning-making (for example, by middle classes and elites, policy makes and politicians); class/race subjectivities and identities, economic restructuring and postcolonial governance".

The breaking of social ties has created poverty throughout history; enclosure of common land, disbanding of indigenous populations, and removing populations from their land and forcing them into slavery created poverty. In addition to poverty, the breaking up of groups and their relationships to others creates relational poverty as those impacted can no longer connect with people who would help them. "The relations of people to their land, to their communities of belonging, to their languages, histories and political struggles" take time to develop and, when lost, mean that individuals have lost the ability to function within a community.

=== Breaking social ties ===
There are instances where other people can be held responsible for breaking another person's social ties. These methods become normalized in society and work to both create poverty and keep certain groups impoverished. "Patterns of social relationship in which some people dominate and even crush others in order to dispossess or expropriate the life-giving resources that these people would otherwise control". These are hierarchical and political powers that allow one to impoverish another. This plays out in Karl Marx's writings on economic and political relationships which create impoverishment within capitalist systems. Today, relational poverty is best understood when both ethnographic and geographical studies are examined, "broad and historically deep enough to discover connections that implicate the global wealthy". This discovered connection creates social categorisation and applies labels to individuals, often to their long term detriment.

Not every individual's networks include people they could reach out to for support. For some, there is a reason they have severed ties with their community. Pahwa found that "Social isolation was related to a number of factors including loss due to death of, or estrangement of loved ones; avoidance of others due to a history of trauma, mental or physical health symptoms, and/or negative experiences with providers or consumers of mental health services". Relational poverty is perpetuated as past history of loss, trauma and unhelpful experiences can prevent establishment of new connections due to mistrust of other people and organizations. Others may be lacking family to draw on for social and emotional support.

== Causes ==
There are three main causes of relational poverty.

Shame plays a large role in why individuals do not reach out for support. The societal ideology of poverty as personal failure contributes to the growing issue of relational poverty. Deindustrialization, financialization, global trade, decrease in wage, and job loss have all contributed to increased rates of poverty. Additionally, poverty being recognized at an individual level, correlates it to be a direct cause of personal failings. Poverty can create relational poverty as individuals are too ashamed to connect with those who would support them.

Another relationship in the socio-eco-political realm is between the poor and those who are in a position to sustain poverty. Persistent poverty reveals the tangible and social barriers an individual must overcome. Relational poverty is impacted by those who can offer aid such as government or non-profits. These well intended solutions such as soup kitchens cannot dismantle the social institutions that create and reinforce poverty.

Many relationally impoverished individuals feel unseen and unaccepted because of their lack of human interaction. "Poverty is the result of the different terms and conditions on which people are included in social life". To combat these ideologies individuals need to be seen as a part of society in tandem with receiving the material aid for poverty.

== Role in homelessness ==
Negative interactions and experiences can create trauma that prevents an individual from ever wanting to re-establish ties. In a study on adverse childhood experiences, "Nearly nine in ten homeless adults have been exposed to at least one early traumatic experience, and more than half of homeless adults have been exposed to four or more early traumatic experiences". This high incidence reveals how many unhoused individuals have experienced trauma, often repeatedly. The unhoused population is particularly susceptible to relational poverty because they often have lost social support systems because of shame or lost access to a phone or other means to connect.

=== Re-establishing social ties ===
Social support can come in different forms to unhoused individuals. Ties to employment, cultural spaces, and to a community are all social ties that can have a positive effect on an unhoused individual's wellbeing. "Furthermore, social support can create positive affective states, and supportive relationships can provide individuals with access to positive social influence that can encourage healthy behaviors."

The U.S. federal government began a program, the Lifeline Assistance program, that gives free government cell phones as well as voice minutes and texting to low income Americans. Coined "Obama phones" the first phone was given in 2008. Access to these phones allows those who have lost contact with their support networks to have a tool to reconnect.
