= Nazir Muhammad Sarwar Khan =

Governor of Herat

Nazir Muhammad Sarwar Khan (died 1888) was the Governor of Herat, Afghanistan from August 1882 to November 1886. A loyal supporter of Abdur Rahman, he accompanied the future Amir into exile and was rewarded with high office upon their return to Afghanistan. However, he was stripped of his role after accusations of corruption, and died in prison.

== Early career ==
Sarwar Khan was an Afghan of the Ghilji tribe. He was a key supporter of Abdur Rahman, a member of the ruling Barakzai dynasty of Afghanistan. Abdur Rahman was on the losing side of a civil war against Sher Ali Khan and fled into exile in 1869. During his exile in Samarkand in the 1870s, Sarwar Khan was his chief servant. When the Second Anglo-Afghan War provided the opportunity for Abdur Rahman to return to Afghanistan, Sarwar Khan accompanied him. Their return was successful, and the British army, led by General Roberts, agreed to acknowledge him as Amir of Afghanistan. Abdur Rahman made Sarwar Khan Governor of Takhtapul, in Balkh. Afterwards, Sarwar Khan commanded troops in Badakhshan under Sardar Abdullah Khan. He was a member of the deputation representing Abdur Rahman at the Kabul Durbar, when his accession to the throne of Afghanistan was publicly declared. In 1881 he came to Kabul, and was then said to be one of the new Amir's confidential advisers.

== Governor of Herat ==
In August 1882, he was appointed governor of Herat, an important post as it had been independently ruled by Ayub Khan until his defeat in 1881. His role at this time was to integrate the province of Herat more closely to the rest of Afghanistan. The most noteworthy feature of his governorship was the presence of the Afghan Boundary Commission between 1884 and 1886, which sparked the Panjdeh incident on 30 March 1885, an event which almost caused war between the Russian Empire and the British Empire. The British commissioners nicknamed him Henry VIII, because of his remarkable similarity in appearance to the English monarch.

== Fall from grace ==
The Afghan Boundary Commission concluded its work in September 1886, and in October it passed through Kabul on its way back to India. It seems likely that someone, possibly Kazi Saad-ud-Din, the Amir's representative on the Commission, gave an unfavourable report of Sarwar Khan to the Amir. In any case, in November 1886 Sarwar Khan was summoned to Kabul, stripped of his governorship – which was given to Kazi Saad-ud-Din instead – and arrested. There he was called upon to pay large sums, and was on one occasion tortured on the rack. In May 1887, however, the Amir reportedly summoned him, took pity on him, and said: 'When I was at certain places I had no funds, and your father and you supplied me. When I was in Russian territory, I took from you Rs. 70,000. Take this amount from me. I will remit the whole balance due from you." However, he was subsequently placed under arrest again. In December 1887 he was placed in close confinement. The Amir ordered that he should only be allowed one rug for his bed. The Amir abused him and threatened to have him blown from a gun. He died in prison in Kabul on February 21, 1888.
