= European influence in Afghanistan =

Overview of the influence of European colonial powers in Afghanistan

European influence in Afghanistan has been present in the country since the Victorian era, when the competing imperial powers of Britain and Russia contested for control over Afghanistan as part of the Great Game.

== Beginnings ==
In 1782, George Forster, a civil servant of the East India Company, undertook a journey that began in Calcutta, Bengal and passed through Kashmir, Afghanistan, Herat, Khorassan, Mazanderan, crossed the Caspian Sea by ship, and then travelled to Baku, Astrakhan, Moscow, Saint Petersburg, and then by ship to London. Forster's detailed description of the journey was published in 1798.

=== Rise of Dost Mohammad Khan ===
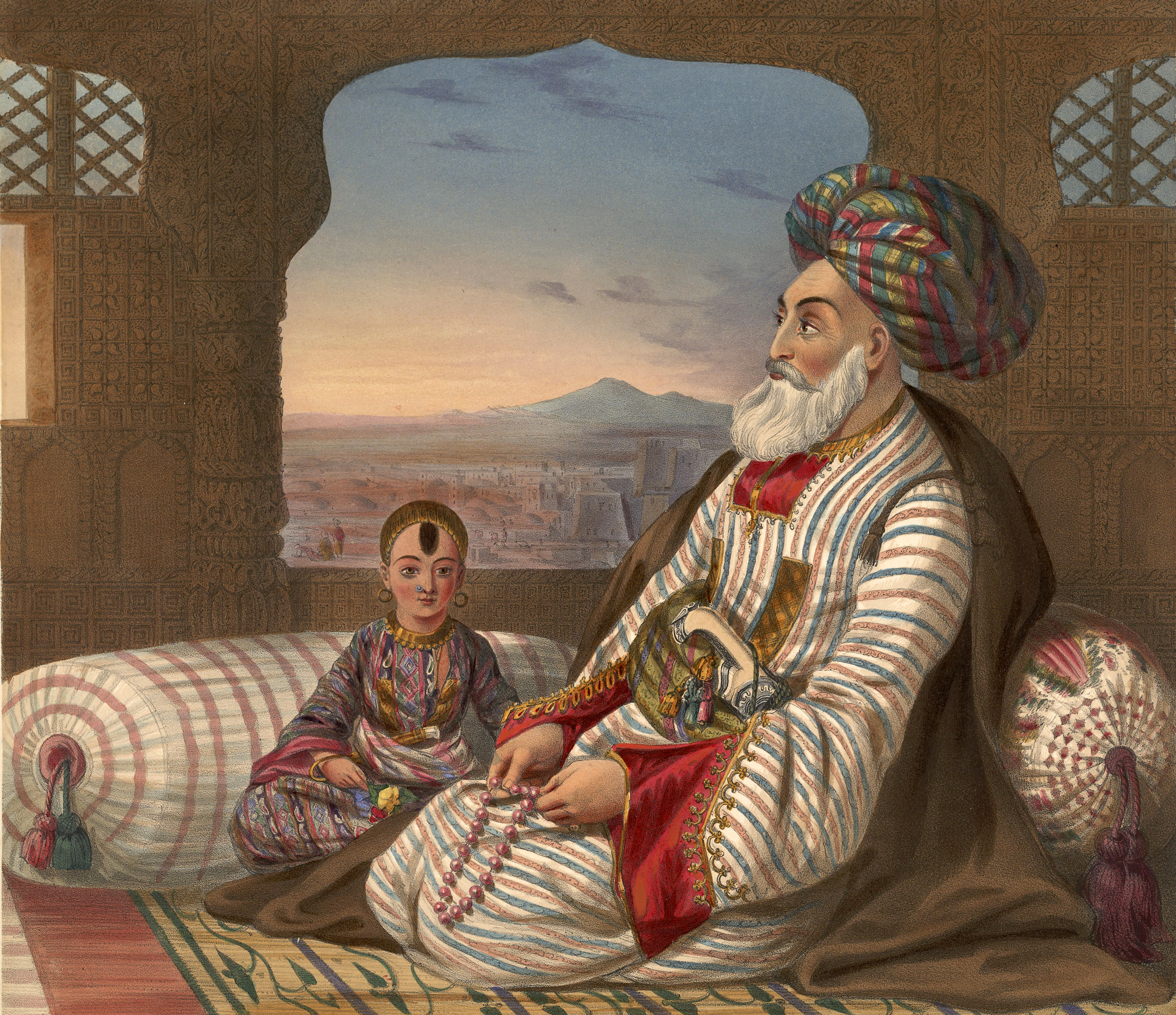
King Dost Mohammad Khan with one of his sons.

After the decline of the Durrani dynasty in 1823, Dost Mohammad Khan established the Barakzai dynasty. Dost Mohammad achieved prominence among his brothers through clever use of the support of his mother's Qizilbash tribesmen and his own youthful apprenticeship under his brother, Fateh Khan. However, in the same year, the Afghans lost their former stronghold of Peshawar to the Sikh Khalsa Army of Ranjit Singh at the Battle of Nowshera. The Afghan forces in the battle were supported by Azim Khan, half-brother of Dost Mohammad.

In 1834 Dost Mohammad defeated an invasion by the former ruler, Shuja Shah Durrani, but his absence from Kabul gave the Sikhs the opportunity to expand westward. Ranjit Singh's forces moved from Peshawar into territory ruled directly by Kabul. In 1836 Dost Mohammad's forces, under the command of his son Akbar Khan, defeated the Sikhs at the Battle of Jamrud, a post fifteen kilometres west of Peshawar. This was a pyrrhic victory and they failed to fully dislodge the Sikhs from Jamrud. The Afghan leader did not follow up this triumph by retaking Peshawar, however, but instead contacted Lord Auckland, the new British governor-general in British India, for help in dealing with the Sikhs. The letter marked the beginning of British influence in Afghanistan, and the subsequent Anglo-Russian struggle known as the Great Game.

=== Great Game ===
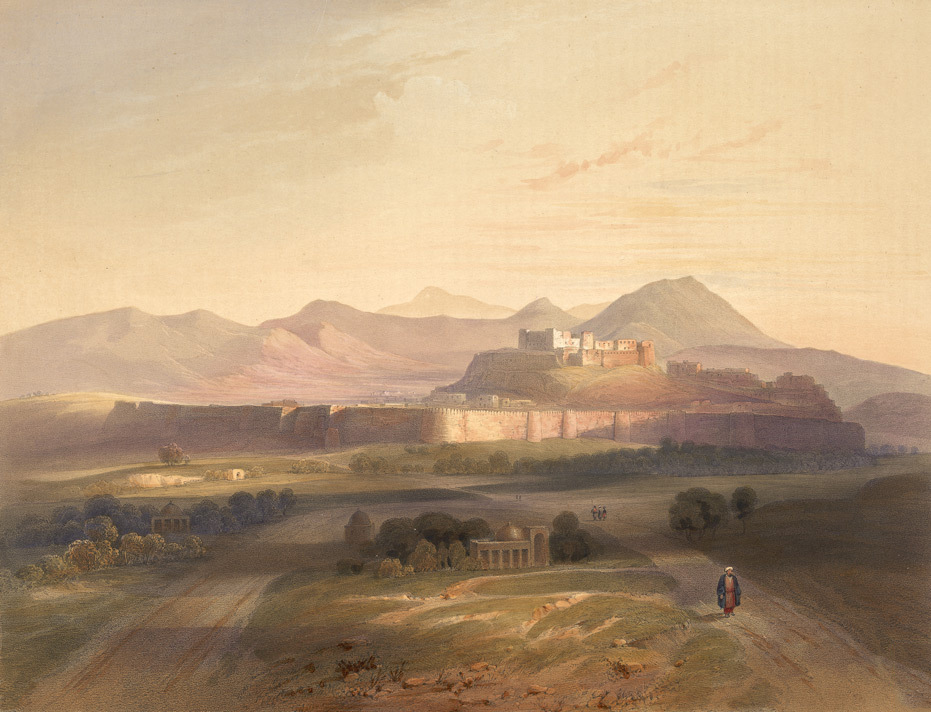
Ghazni in early 1800s.

During the 19th century, a political and diplomatic confrontation developed between Britain and Russia over Afghanistan which would become known as the Great Game. The British became the major European power in South Asia after the 1763 Treaty of Paris and began to show interest in Afghanistan as early as their 1809 treaty with Shah Shuja Durrani. In the early decades of the 19th century, it became clear to the British that the major threat to their interests in India would not come from the fragmented Afghan empire, the Iranians, or the French, but from the Russians, who had already begun a steady advance southward from the Caucasus winning decisive wars against the Ottomans and Persians. The British viewed Russia's absorption of the Caucasus, the Kyrgyz and Turkmen lands, the Khanate of Khiva, and the Emirate of Bukhara with equal suspicion as a threat to their interests in the Indian subcontinent. The débâcle of the Afghan civil war left a vacuum in the Hindu Kush area that concerned the British, who were well aware of the many times in history it had been employed as an invasion route to South Asia.

At the same time, the Russians feared the possibility a permanent British foothold in Central Asia as the British expanded northward, incorporating the Punjab, Sindh, and Kashmir into their empire. until the mid-19th century, Russian ambassadors to the region spent much of their time trying to free Russians who had been taken as slaves by the khanates. Napoleon had proposed a joint Franco-Russian invasion of India to tsar Paul I of Russia. Expecting a future action by the British against Russia and her allies in Europe, Paul decided in 1801 to make the first move towards where he believed the British Empire was weakest (Indian March of Paul). He wrote to the Ataman of the Don Cossacks Troops, Cavalry General Vasily Petrovich Orlov, directing him to march to Orenburg, conquer the Central Asian Khanates, and from there invade India. Paul was assassinated in the same year, and the invasion was terminated. Russia feared the influence that a Muslim power with British support might have on the other khanates in the region.

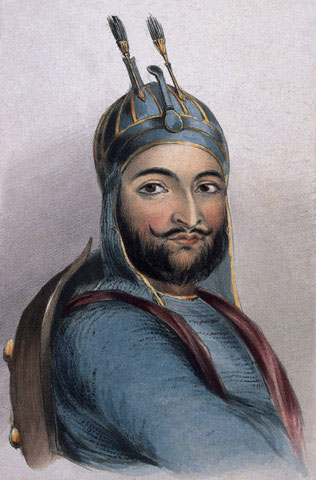
Prince Akbar Khan, son of Dost Mohammad Khan.

In addition to this rivalry between Britain and Russia, there were two specific reasons for British concern over Russia's intentions. First was the Russian influence at the Iranian court, which prompted the Russians to support Iran in its attempt to take Herat, historically the western gateway to Afghanistan and northern India. In 1837 Iran advanced on Herat with the support and advice of Russian officers. The second immediate reason was the presence in Kabul in 1837 of a Russian agent, Yan Vitkevich, who was ostensibly there, as was the British agent Alexander Burnes, for commercial discussions.

The threat of the expanding Russian Empire beginning to push for an advantage in the Afghanistan region placed pressure on British India, in what became known as the Great Game. The Great Game set in motion the confrontation of the British and Russian empires, whose spheres of influence moved steadily closer to one another until they met in Afghanistan. It also involved repeated attempts by the British to establish a puppet government in Kabul. The remainder of the 19th century saw greater European involvement in Afghanistan and her surrounding territories and heightened conflict among the ambitious local rulers as Afghanistan's fate played out globally.

The British demanded that Dost Mohammad sever all contact with the Iranians and Russians, remove Vitkevich from Kabul, surrender all claims to Peshawar, and respect Peshawar's independence as well as that of Kandahar, which was under the control of his brothers at the time. In return, the British government intimated that it would ask Ranjit Singh to reconcile with the Afghans. When Auckland refused to put the agreement in writing, Dost Mohammad suspended negotiations the British and began negotiations with Vitkevich.

In 1838, Auckland, Ranjit Singh, and Shuja signed an agreement stating that Shuja would regain control of Kabul and Kandahar with the help of the British and Sikhs; he would accept Sikh rule of the former Afghan provinces already controlled by Ranjit Singh, and that Herat would remain independent. In practice, the plan replaced Dost Mohammad with a British figurehead whose autonomy would be similar to the princes who ruled over the princely states in British India.

It soon became apparent to the British that Sikh participation, advancing toward Kabul through the Khyber Pass while Shuja and the British advanced through Kandahar, would not be forthcoming. Auckland's plan in the spring of 1838 was for the Sikhs to place Shuja on the Afghan throne, with British support. By the end of the summer however, the plan had changed; now the British alone would impose the pliant Shuja Shah.

== First Anglo-Afghan War, 1838–1842 ==
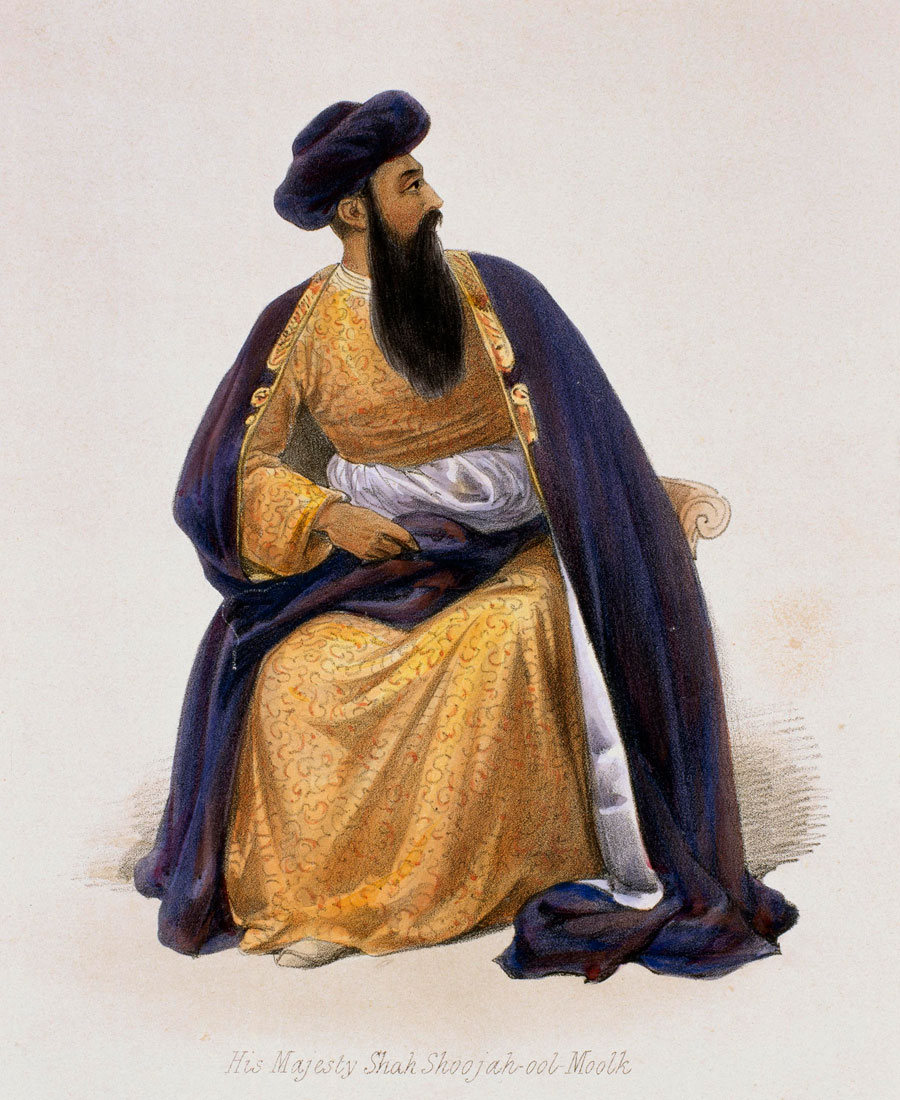
Shah Shujah became the last Durrani ruler, who first reigned between 1803 and 1809, and again from 1839 to 1842.

As a prelude to his invasion plans, the Governor-General of India Lord Auckland issued the Simla Manifesto in October 1838, setting forth the necessary reasons for British intervention in Afghanistan. The manifesto stated that in order to ensure the welfare of India, the British must have a trustworthy ally on India's western frontier. The British claim that their troops were merely supporting Shah Shujah's small army in retaking what was once his throne fooled no one. Although the Simla Manifesto stated that British troops would be withdrawn as soon as Shuja was installed in Kabul, Shuja's rule depended entirely on British support to suppress rebellion and on British funds to buy the support of tribal chiefs. The British denied that they were invading Afghanistan, instead claiming they were supporting its legitimate Shuja government "against foreign interference and factious opposition".

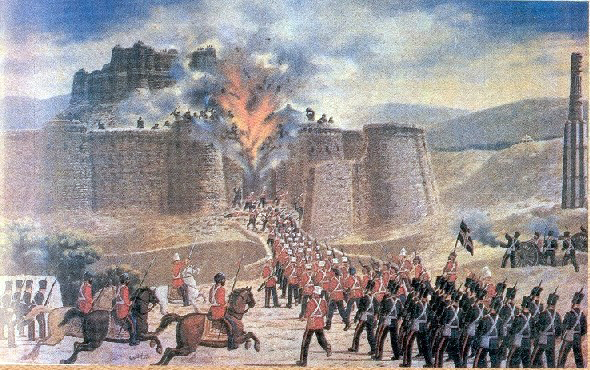
Battle of Ghazni

In November 1841 insurrection and massacre flared up in Kabul. The British vacillated and disagreed and were beleaguered in their inadequate cantonments. The British negotiated with the most influential sirdars, cut off as they were by winter and insurgent tribes from any hope of relief. Mohammad Akbar Khan, son of the captive Dost Mohammad, arrived in Kabul and became effective leader of the sirdars. At a conference with them Sir William MacNaghten was killed, but in spite of this, the sirdars' demands were agreed to by the British and they withdrew. During the withdrawal they were attacked by Ghilzai tribesmen and in running battles through the snowbound passes nearly the entire column of 4,500 troops and 12,000 camp followers were killed. Of the British only one, Dr. William Brydon, reached Jalalabad, while a few others were captured.

Afghan forces loyal to Akbar Khan besieged the remaining British contingents at Kandahar, Ghazni and Jalalabad. Ghazni fell, but the other garrisons held out, and with the help of reinforcements from India their besiegers were defeated. While preparations were under way for a renewed advance on Kabul, the new Governor-General Lord Ellenborough ordered British forces to leave Afghanistan after securing the release of the prisoners from Kabul and taking reprisals. The forces from Kandahar and Jalalabad again defeated Akbar Khan, retook and sacked Ghazni and Kabul, rescuing the prisoners before withdrawing through the Khyber Pass.

== Mid-19th century ==
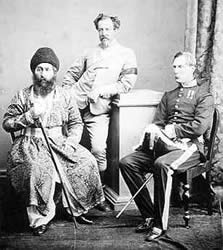
King Sher Ali Khan with CD Charles Chamberlain and Sir Richard F. Pollock in 1869.

After months of chaos in Kabul, Mohammad Akbar Khan secured local control and in April 1843 his father Dost Mohammad, who had been released by the British, returned to the throne in Afghanistan. In the following decade, Dost Mohammad concentrated his efforts on reconquering Mazari Sharif, Konduz, Badakhshan, and Kandahar. Mohammad Akbar Khan died in 1845. During the Second Anglo-Sikh War (1848–49), Dost Mohammad's last effort to take Peshawar failed.

By 1854 the British wanted to resume relations with Dost Mohammad, whom they had essentially ignored in the intervening twelve years. The 1855 Treaty of Peshawar reopened diplomatic relations, proclaimed respect for each side's territorial integrity, and pledged both sides as friends of each other's friends and enemies of each other's enemies.

In 1857, an addendum to the 1855 treaty permitted a British military mission to become a presence in Kandahar (but not Kabul) during a conflict with the Persians, who had attacked Herat in 1856. During the Indian Rebellion of 1857, some British officials suggested restoring Peshawar to Dost Mohammad, in return for his support against the rebellious sepoys of the Bengal Army, but this view was rejected by British political officers on the North West frontier, who believed that Dost Mohammad would see this as a sign of weakness and turn against the British.

In 1863, Dost Mohammad retook Herat with British acquiescence. A few months later, he died. Sher Ali Khan, his third son, and proclaimed successor, failed to recapture Kabul from his older brother, Mohammad Afzal (whose troops were led by his son, Abdur Rahman) until 1868, after which Abdur Rahman retreated across the Amu Darya and bided his time.

In the years immediately following the First Anglo-Afghan War, and especially after the Indian Rebellion of 1857 against the British in India, Liberal Party governments in London took a political view of Afghanistan as a buffer state. By the time Sher Ali had established control in Kabul in 1868, he found the British ready to support his regime with arms and funds, but nothing more. Over the next ten years, relations between the Afghan ruler and Britain deteriorated steadily. The Afghan ruler was worried about the southward encroachment of Russia, which by 1873 had taken over the lands of the khan, or ruler, of Khiva. Sher Ali sent an envoy seeking British advice and support. The previous year the British had signed an agreement with the Russians in which the latter agreed to respect the northern boundaries of Afghanistan and to view the territories of the Afghan Emir as outside their sphere of influence. The British, however, refused to give any assurances to the disappointed Sher Ali.

== Second Anglo-Afghan War, 1878–1880 ==
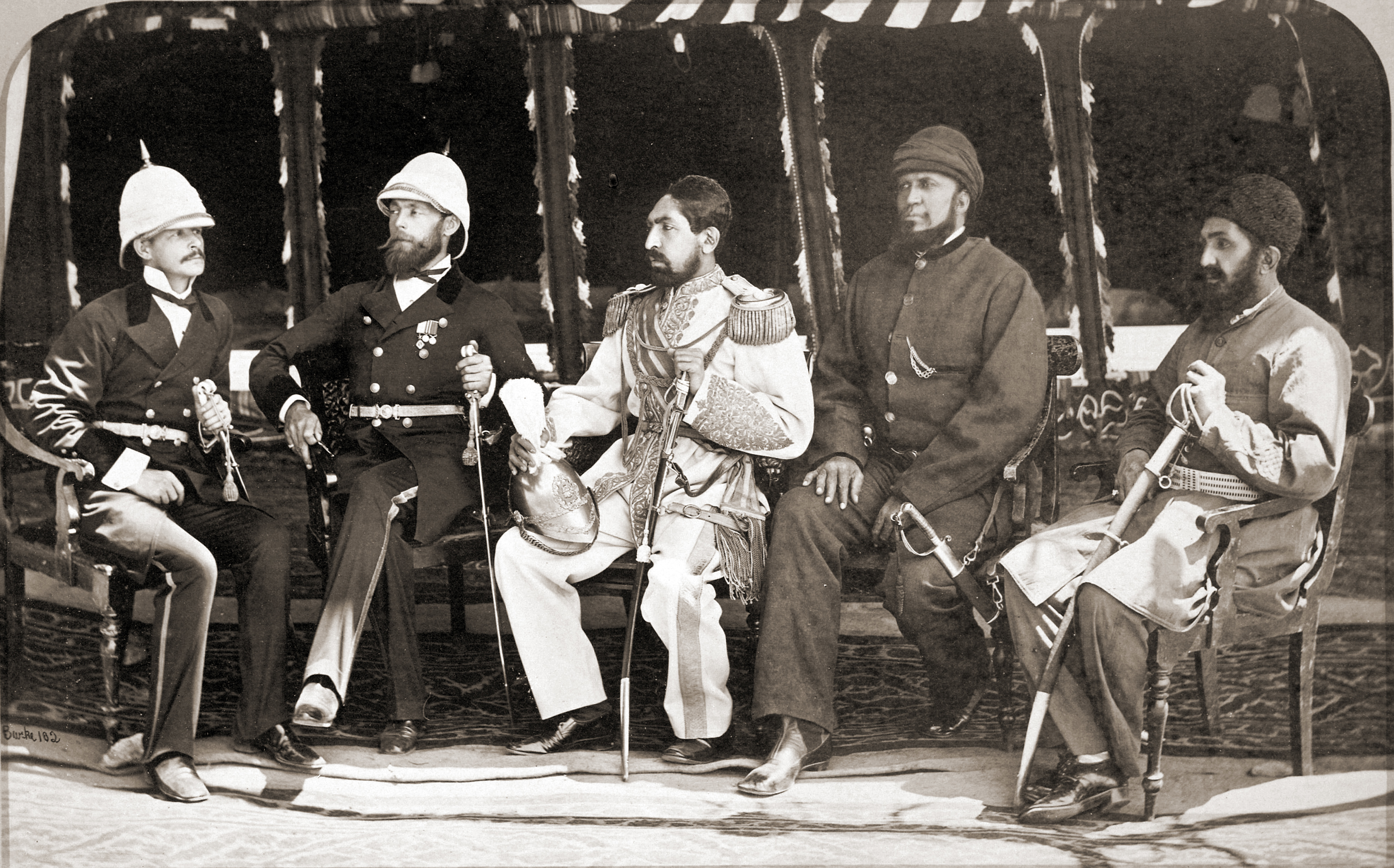
King Mohammad Yaqub Khan with Britain's Sir Pierre Cavagnari on 26 May 1879, when the Treaty of Gandamak was signed.

After tension between Russia and Britain in Europe ended with the June 1878 Congress of Berlin, Russia turned its attention to Central Asia. That same summer, Russia sent an uninvited diplomatic mission to Kabul. Sher Ali tried, but failed, to keep them out. Russian envoys arrived in Kabul on 22 July 1878 and on 14 August, the British demanded that Sher Ali accept a British mission too.

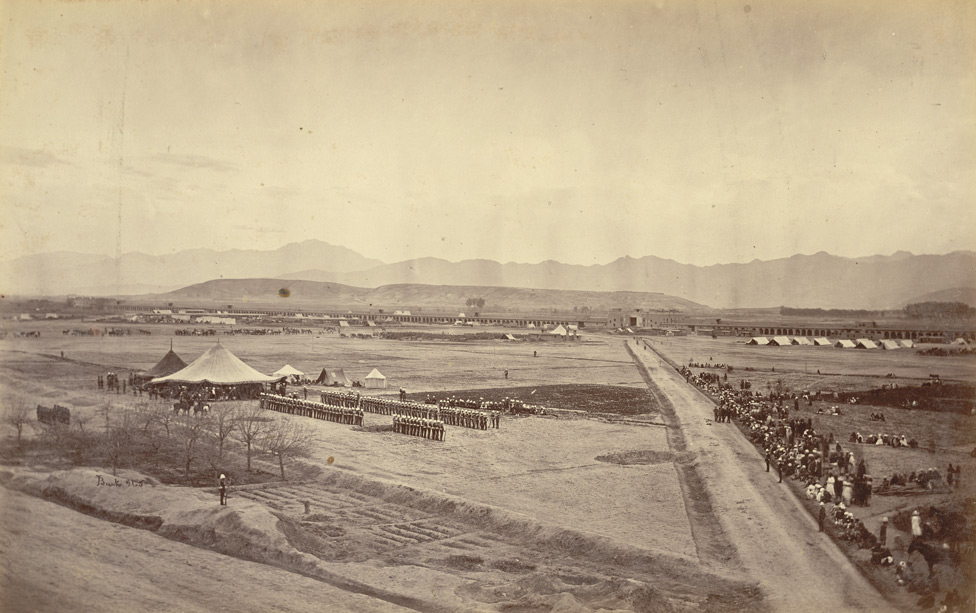
Durban Maidan of Sherpur Cantonment in 1879 near Kabul.

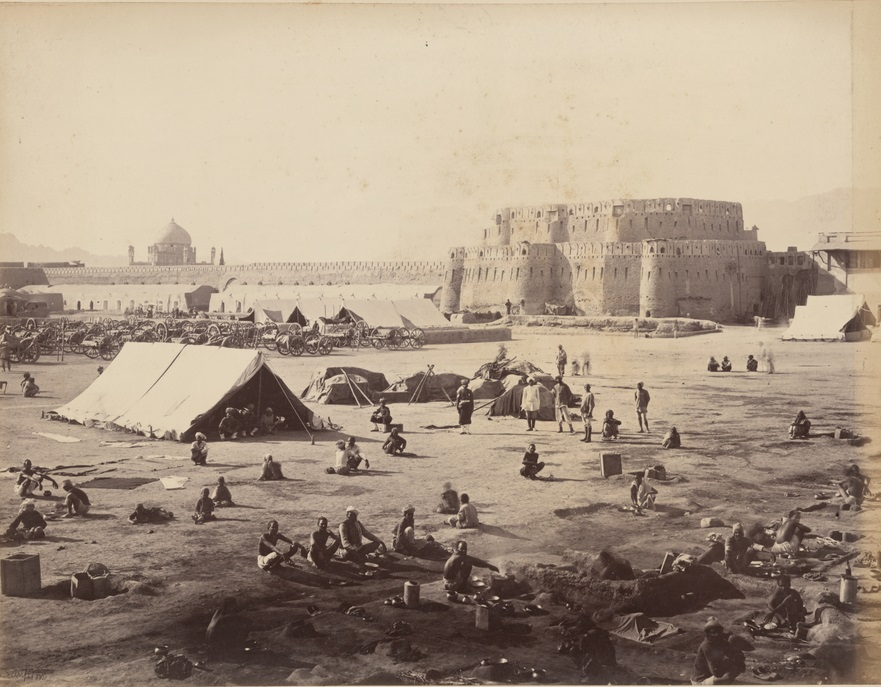
British and allied forces at Kandahar after the 1880 Battle of Kandahar.

The amir not only refused to receive a British mission but threatened to stop it if it were dispatched. Lord Lytton, the viceroy, ordered a diplomatic mission to set out for Kabul in September 1878 but the mission was turned back as it approached the eastern entrance of the Khyber Pass, triggering the Second Anglo-Afghan War. A British force of about 40,000 fighting men was distributed into military columns which penetrated Afghanistan at three different points. An alarmed Sher Ali attempted to appeal in person to the Tsar for assistance, but unable to do so, he returned to Mazari Sharif, where he died on 21 February 1879.

With British forces occupying much of the country, Sher Ali's son and successor, Mohammad Yaqub Khan, signed the Treaty of Gandamak in May 1879 in order to put a quick end to the conflict. According to this agreement and in return for an annual subsidy and vague assurances of assistance in case of foreign aggression, Yaqub relinquished control of Afghan foreign affairs to the British. British representatives were installed in Kabul and other locations, British control was extended to the Khyber and Michni Passes, and Afghanistan ceded various frontier areas and Quetta to Britain. The British forces then withdrew. Soon afterwards, an uprising in Kabul led to the killings of Britain's Resident in Kabul, Sir Pierre Cavagnari and his guards and staff on 3 September 1879, provoking the second phase of the Second Afghan War. Major General Sir Frederick Roberts led the Kabul Field Force over the Shutargardan Pass into central Afghanistan, defeated the Afghan Army at Char Asiab on 6 October 1879 and occupied Kabul. Ghazi Mohammad Jan Khan Wardak staged an uprising and attacked British forces near Kabul in the Siege of the Sherpur Cantonment in December 1879, but his defeat there resulted in the collapse of this rebellion.

Yaqub Khan, suspected of complicity in the killings of Cavagnari and his staff, was obliged to abdicate. The British considered a number of possible political settlements, including partitioning Afghanistan between multiple rulers or placing Yaqub's brother Ayub Khan on the throne, but ultimately decided to install his cousin Abdur Rahman Khan as emir instead. Ayub Khan, who had been serving as governor of Herat, rose in revolt, defeated a British detachment at the Battle of Maiwand in July 1880 and besieged Kandahar. Roberts then led the main British force from Kabul and decisively defeated Ayub Khan in September at the Battle of Kandahar, bringing his rebellion to an end. Abdur Rahman had confirmed the Treaty of Gandamak, leaving the British in control of the territories ceded by Yaqub Khan and ensuring British control of Afghanistan's foreign policy in exchange for protection and a subsidy. Abandoning the provocative policy of maintaining a British resident in Kabul, but having achieved all their other objectives, the British withdrew.

== The Iron Amir, 1880–1901 ==
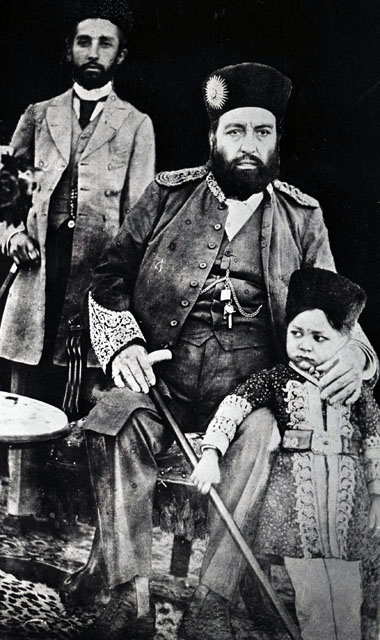
Amir Abdur Rahman Khan (The Iron Amir) in 1897.

As far as British interests were concerned, Abdur Rahman answered their prayers: a forceful, intelligent leader capable of welding his divided people into a state; and he was willing to accept limitations to his power imposed by British control of his country's foreign affairs and the British buffer state policy. His twenty-one-year reign was marked by efforts to modernize and establish control of the kingdom, whose boundaries were delineated by the two empires bordering it. Abdur Rahman turned his considerable energies to what evolved into the creation of the modern state of Afghanistan.

He achieved this consolidation of Afghanistan in three ways. He suppressed various rebellions and followed up his victories with harsh punishment, execution, and deportation. He broke the stronghold of Pashtun tribes by forcibly transplanting them. He transplanted his most powerful Pashtun enemies, the Ghilzai, and other tribes from southern and south-central Afghanistan to areas north of the Hindu Kush with predominantly non-Pashtun populations. The last non-Muslim Afghans of Kafiristan north of Kabul were forcefully converted to Islam. Finally, he created a system of provincial governorates different from old tribal boundaries. Provincial governors had a great deal of power in local matters, and an army was placed at their disposal to enforce tax collection and suppress dissent. Abdur Rahman kept a close eye on these governors, however, by creating an effective intelligence system. During his reign, tribal organization began to be eroded as provincial government officials allowed land to change hands outside the traditional clan and tribal limits.

The Pashtuns battled and conquered the Uzbeks and forced them into the status of ruled people who were discriminated against. Out of anti-Russian strategic interests, the British assisted the Afghan conquest of the Uzbek Khanates, giving weapons to the Afghans and supporting the Afghan government's colonization of northern Afghanistan by Pashtuns, which involved sending massive amounts of Pashtun colonists onto Uzbek land.

In addition to forging a nation from the splintered regions making up Afghanistan, Abdur Rahman tried to modernize his kingdom by forging a regular army and the first institutionalized bureaucracy. Despite his distinctly authoritarian personality, Abdur Rahman called for a loya jirga, an assemblage of royal princes, important notables, and religious leaders. According to his autobiography, Abdur Rahman had three goals: subjugating the tribes, extending government control through a strong, visible army, and reinforcing the power of the ruler and the royal family.

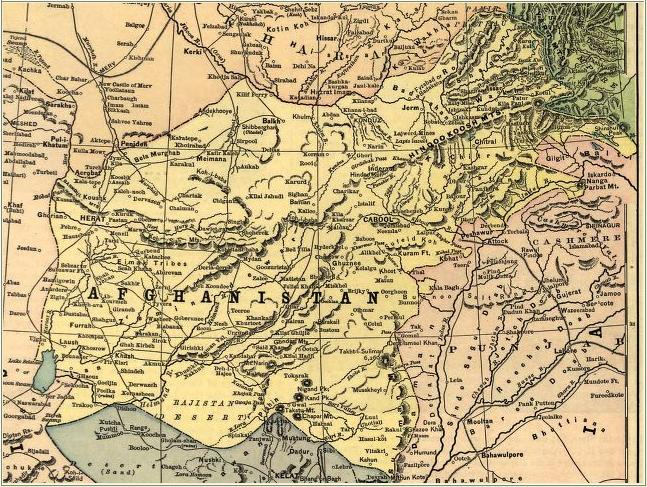
Maps showing the boundary of Afghanistan before the 1893 Durand Line Treaty.

During his visit to Rawalpindi in 1885, the Amir requested the Viceroy of India to depute a Muslim Envoy to Kabul who was noble birth and of ruling family background. Mirza Atta Ullah Khan, Sardar Bahadur s/o Khan Bahadur Mirza Fakir Ullah Khan (Saman Burj Wazirabad), a direct descendant of Jarral Rajput Rajas of Rajauri, was selected and approved by the Amir to be the British Envoy to Kabul.

Abdur Rahman also paid attention to technological advance. He brought foreign physicians, engineers (especially for mining), geologists, and printers to Afghanistan. He imported European machinery and encouraged the establishment of small factories to manufacture soap, candles, and leather goods. He sought European technical advice on communications, transport, and irrigation. Local Afghan tribes strongly resisted this modernization. Workmen making roads had to be protected by the army against local warriors. Nonetheless, despite these sweeping internal policies, Abdur Rahman's foreign policy was completely in foreign hands.

The first important frontier dispute was the Panjdeh incident of 1885, precipitated by Russian encroachment into Central Asia. Having seized the Merv (now Mary) Oasis by 1884, Russian forces were directly adjacent to Afghanistan. Claims to the Panjdeh Oasis were in debate, with the Russians keen to take over all the region's Turkoman domains. After battling Afghan forces in the spring of 1885, the Russians seized the oasis. Russian and British troops were quickly alerted, but the two powers reached a compromise; Russia was in possession of the oasis, and Britain believed it could keep the Russians from advancing any farther. Without an Afghan say in the matter, the Joint Anglo-Russian Boundary Commission agreed that the Russians would relinquish the farthest territory captured in their advance but retain Panjdeh. This agreement on these border sections delineated for Afghanistan a permanent northern frontier at the Amu Darya, but also involved the loss of much territory, especially around Panjdeh.

The second section of Afghan border demarcated during Abdur Rahman's reign was in the Wakhan. The British insisted that Abdur Rahman accept sovereignty over this remote region, where unruly Kyrgyz held sway; he had no choice but to accept Britain's compromise. In 1895 and 1896, another Joint Anglo-Russian Boundary Commission agreed on the frontier boundary to the far northeast of Afghanistan, which bordered Chinese territory (although the Chinese did not formally accept this as a boundary between the two countries until 1964.)

For Abdur Rahman, delineating the boundary with India (through the Pashtun area) was far more significant, and it was during his reign that the Durand Line was drawn. Under pressure, Abdur Rahman agreed in 1893 to accept a mission headed by the British Indian foreign secretary, Sir Mortimer Durand, to define the limits of British and Afghan control in the Pashtun territories. Boundary limits were agreed on by Durand and Abdur Rahman before the end of 1893, but there is some question about the degree to which Abdur Rahman willingly ceded certain regions. There were indications that he regarded the Durand Line as a delimitation of separate areas of political responsibility, not a permanent international frontier, and that he did not explicitly cede control over certain parts (such as Kurram and Chitral) that were already in British control under the Treaty of Gandamak.

The Durand Line cut through tribes and bore little relation to the realities of demography or military strategy. The line laid the foundation not for peace between the border regions, but for heated disagreement between the governments of Afghanistan and British India, and later, Afghanistan and Pakistan over what came to be known as the issue of Pashtunistan or 'Land of the Pashtuns'. (See Siege of Malakand).

The clearest manifestation that Abdur Rahman had established control in Afghanistan was the peaceful succession of his eldest son, Habibullah Khan, to the throne on his father's death in October 1901. Although Abdur Rahman had fathered many children, he groomed Habibullah to succeed him, and he made it difficult for his other sons to contest the succession by keeping power from them and sequestering them in Kabul under his control.

== Habibullah Khan, 1901–1919 ==
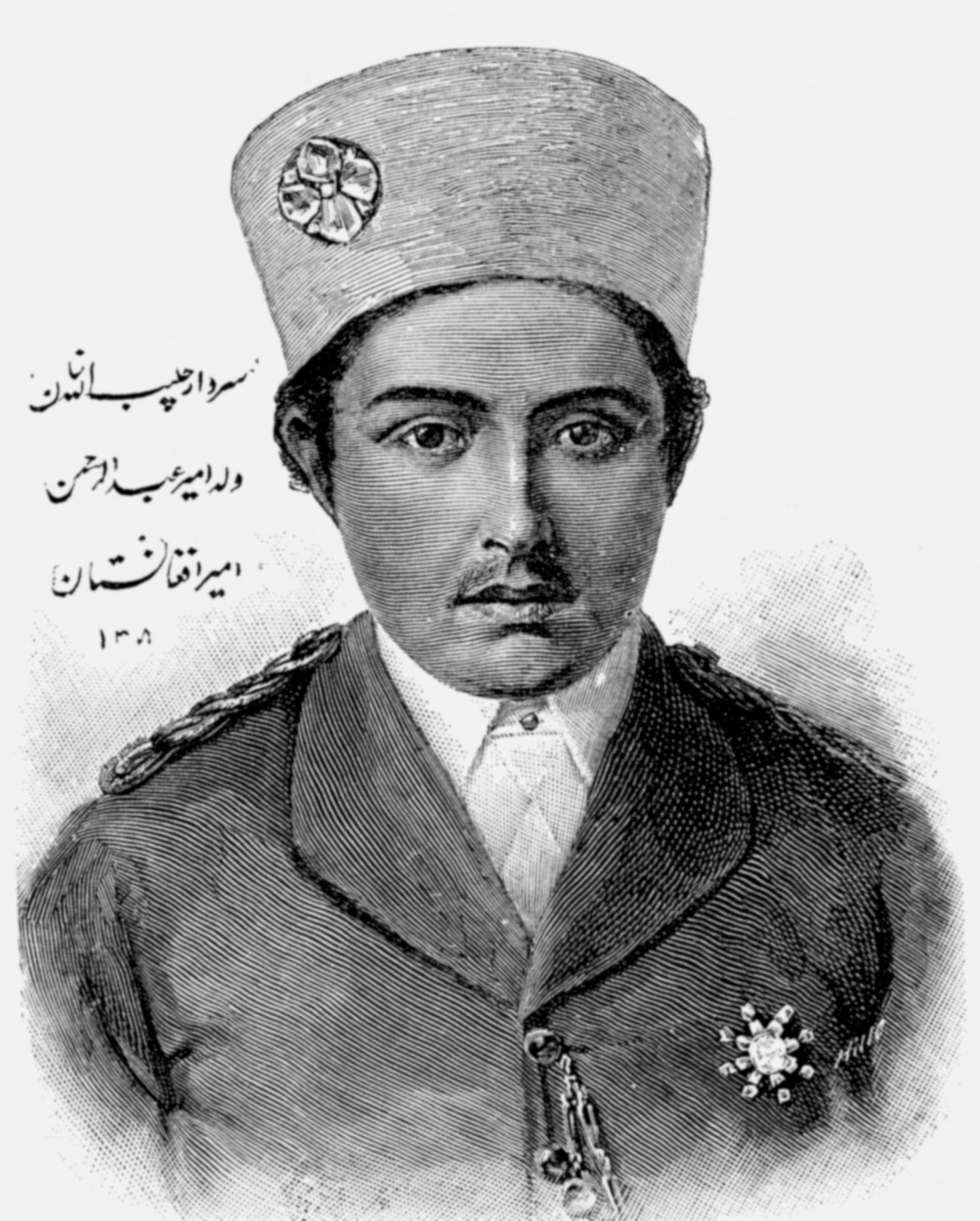
Habibullah Khan, eldest son of Abdur Rahman Khan, in 1893.

Habibullah Khan, Abdur Rahman Khan's eldest son and child of a slave mother, kept a close watch on the palace intrigues revolving around his father's more distinguished wife (a granddaughter of Dost Mohammad), who sought the throne for her own son. Although made secure in his position as ruler by virtue of support from the army which was created by his father, Habibullah was not as domineering as Abdur Rahman. Consequently, the influence of religious leaders as well as that of Mahmud Tarzi, a cousin of the king, increased during his reign.

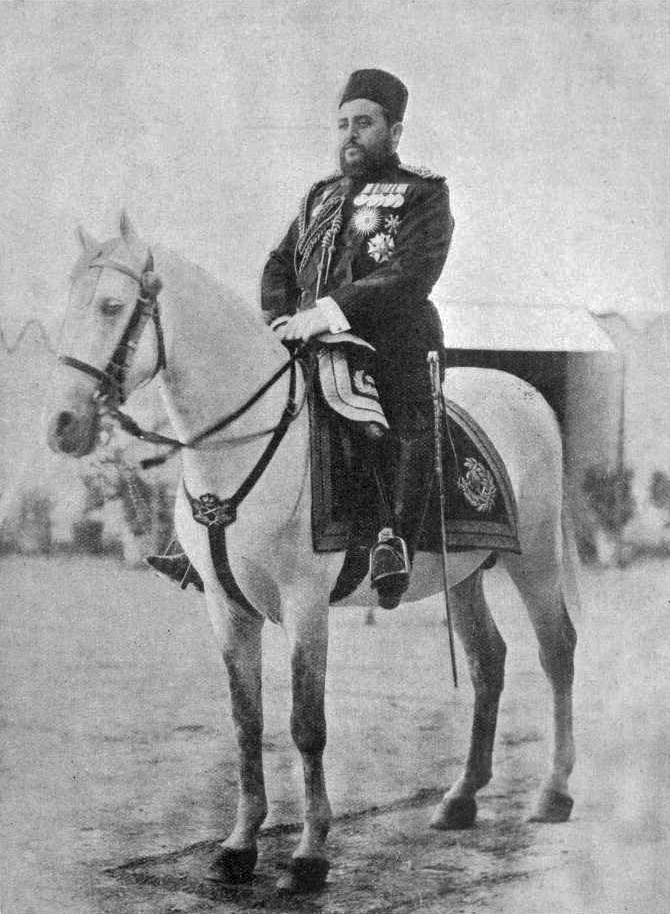
King Habibullah Khan in 1907

Mahmud Tarzi, a highly educated, well-traveled poet and journalist, founded an Afghan nationalist newspaper after gaining permission from Habibullah, and until 1919 used the newspaper as a platform for rebutting clerical criticism of Western-influenced changes in government and society, for espousing full Afghan independence, and for other reforms. Tarzi's passionate Afghan nationalism influenced a future generation of Asian reformers.

The boundary with Iran was firmly delineated in 1904, replacing the ambiguous line made by a British commission in 1872. Agreement could not be reached, however, on sharing the waters of the Helmand River.

Like all foreign policy developments of this period affecting Afghanistan, the conclusion of the "Great Game" between Russia and Britain occurred without the Afghan ruler's participation. The 1907 Anglo-Russian Convention (the Convention of Saint Petersburg) not only divided the region into separate areas of Russian and British influence but also established foundations for Afghan neutrality. The convention provided for Russian acquiescence that Afghanistan was now outside this sphere of influence, and for Russia to consult directly with Britain on matters relating to Russian-Afghan relations. Britain, for its part, would not occupy or annex Afghan territory, or interfere in Afghanistan's internal affairs.

During World War I, Afghanistan remained neutral despite pressure to support Turkey when its sultan proclaimed his nation's participation in what it considered a holy war. Habibullah did, however, entertain an Indo-German–Turkish mission in Kabul in 1915 that had as its titular head the Indian nationalist Mahendra Pratap and was led by Oskar Niedermayer and the German legate Werner Otto von Hentig. After much procrastination, he won an agreement from the Central Powers for a huge payment and arms provision in exchange for attacking British India. But the crafty Afghan ruler clearly viewed the war as an opportunity to play one side off against the other, for he also offered the British to resist a Central Powers attack on India in exchange for an end to British control of Afghan foreign policy.

== Third Anglo-Afghan War and Independence ==
Amanullah's ten years of reign initiated a period of dramatic change in Afghanistan in both foreign and domestic politics. Amanullah declared full independence and sparked the Third Anglo-Afghan War. Amanullah altered foreign policy in his new relations with external powers and transformed domestic politics with his social, political, and economic reforms. Although his reign ended abruptly, he achieved some notable successes, and his efforts failed as much due to the centrifugal forces of tribal Afghanistan and the machinations of Russia and Britain as to any political folly on his part.

Amanullah came to power just as the entente between Russia and Britain broke down following the Russian Revolution of 1917. Once again Afghanistan provided a stage on which the great powers played out their schemes against one another. Keen to modernise his country and remove all foreign influence, Amanullah, sought to shore up his powerbase. Amidst intrigue in the Afghan court, and political and civil unrest in India, he sought to divert attention from the internal divisions of Afghanistan and unite all factions behind him by attacking the British.

Using the civil unrest in India as an excuse to move troops to the Durand Line, Afghan troops crossed the border at the western end of the Khyber Pass on 3 May 1919 and occupied the village of Bagh, the scene of an earlier uprising in April. In response, the Indian government ordered a full mobilisation and on 6 May 1919 declared war. For the British it had come at a time when they were still recovering from the First World War. The troops that were stationed in India were mainly reserves and Territorials, who were awaiting demobilisation and keen to return to Britain, whilst the few regular regiments that were available were tired and depleted from five years of fighting.

Afghan forces achieved success in the initial days of the war, taking the British and Indians by surprise in two main thrusts as the Afghan regular army was joined by large numbers of Pashtun tribesmen from both sides of the border. A series of skirmishes then followed as the British and Indians recovered from their initial surprise. As a counterbalance to deficiencies in manpower and morale, the British had a considerable advantage in terms of equipment, possessing machine guns, armoured cars, motor transport, wireless communications and aircraft and it was the latter that would prove decisive.

British forces deployed air forces for the first time in the region, and the King's home was directly targeted in what is the first case of aerial bombardment in Afghanistan's history. The attacks played a key role in forcing an armistice but brought an angry rebuke from King Amanullah. He wrote: "It is a matter of great regret that the throwing of bombs by zeppelins on London was denounced as a most savage act and the bombardment of places of worship and sacred spots was considered a most abominable operation. While we now see with our own eyes that such operations were a habit which is prevalent among all civilized people of the west".

The fighting concluded in August 1919 and Britain virtually dictated the terms of the Anglo-Afghan Treaty of 1919, a temporary armistice that provided, on one somewhat ambiguous interpretation, for Afghan self-determination in foreign affairs. Before final negotiations were concluded in 1921, however, Afghanistan had already begun to establish its own foreign policy without repercussions anyway, including diplomatic relations with the new government in the Soviet Union in 1919. During the 1920s, Afghanistan established diplomatic relations with most major countries.

== Amanullah Khan, 1919–1929 ==
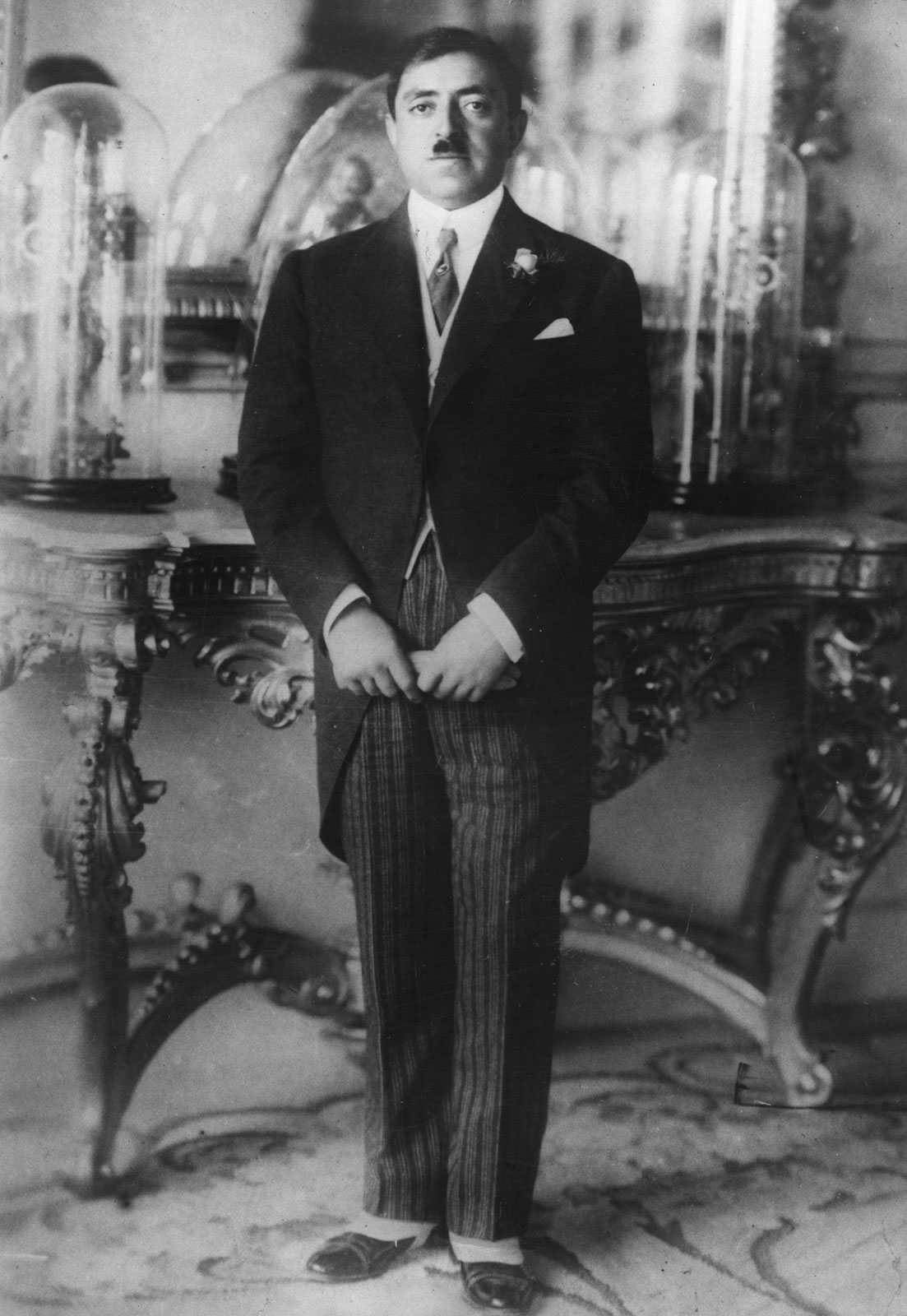
King Amanullah, third son of Habibullah Khan.

On 20 February 1919, Habibullah Khan was assassinated on a hunting trip. He had not declared a succession, but left his third son, Amanullah Khan, in charge in Kabul. Amanullah did have an older brother, Nasrullah Khan. But, because Amanullah controlled both the national treasury and the army, Amanullah was well situated to seize power. The army's support allowed Amanullah to suppress other claims and imprison those relatives who would not swear loyalty to him. Within a few months, the new amir had gained the allegiance of most tribal leaders and established control over the cities.

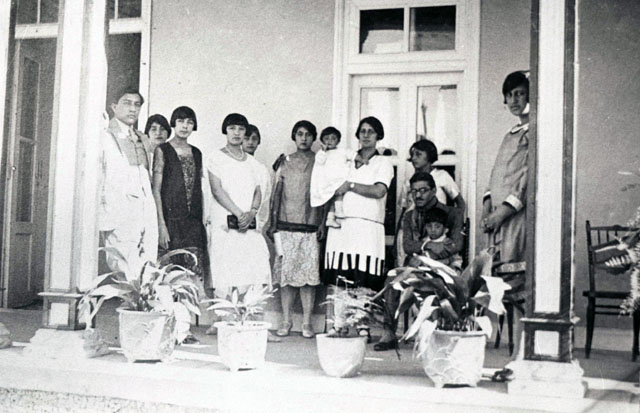
Family life of Afghan politicians in 1927.

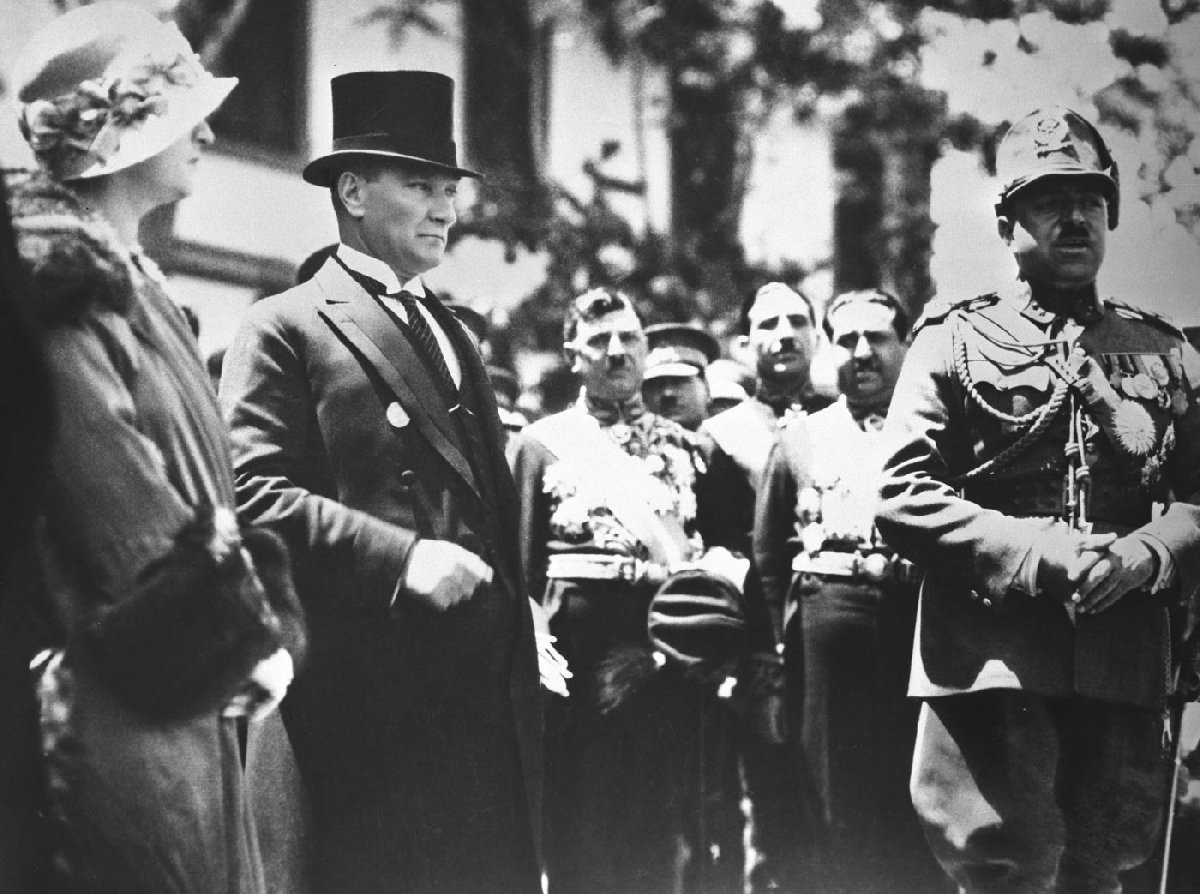
King Amanullah in 1928, the scope of the European tour with Mustafa Kemal Atatürk in Turkey.

Amanullah Khan's reforms were heavily influenced by Europe. This came through the influence of Mahmud Tarzi, who was both Amanullah Khan's father-in-law and Foreign Minister. Mahmud Tarzi, a highly educated, well-traveled poet, journalist, and diplomat, was a key figure that brought Western dress and etiquette to Afghanistan. He also fought for progressive reforms such as woman's rights, educational rights, and freedom of the press. All of these influences, brought by Tarzi and others, were welcomed by Amanullah Khan.

In 1926, Amanullah ended the Emirate of Afghanistan and proclaimed the Kingdom of Afghanistan with himself as king. In 1927 and 1928, King Amanullah Khan and his wife Soraya Tarzi visited Europe. On this trip they were honored and feted. In fact, in 1928 the King and Queen of Afghanistan received honorary degrees from the University of Oxford. This was an era when other Muslim nations, like Turkey and Egypt were also on the path to modernization. King Amanullah was so impressed with the social progress of Europe that he tried to implement them right away, this met with heavy resistance from the conservative society and eventually led to his demise.

Amanullah enjoyed early popularity within Afghanistan and he used his power to modernize the country. Amanullah created new cosmopolitan schools for both boys and girls in the region and overturned centuries-old traditions such as strict dress codes for women. He created a new capital city and increased trade with Europe and Asia. He also advanced a modernist constitution that incorporated equal rights and individual freedoms. This rapid modernization though, created a backlash, and a reactionary uprising known as the Khost rebellion which was suppressed in 1925.

After Amanullah travelled to Europe in late 1927, opposition to his rule increased. An uprising in Jalalabad culminated in a march to the capital, and much of the army deserted rather than resist. On 14 January 1929, Amanullah abdicated in favor of his brother, King Inayatullah Khan. On 17 January, Inayatullah abdicated and Habibullah Kalakani became the next ruler of Afghanistan and restored the emirate. However, his rule was short lived and, on 17 October 1929, Habibullah Kalakani was overthrown and replaced by King Nadir Khan.

After his abdication in 1929, Amanullah went into temporary exile in India. When he attempted to return to Afghanistan, he had little support from the people. From India, the ex-king traveled to Europe and settled in Italy, and later in Switzerland. Meanwhile, Nadir Khan made sure his return to Afghanistan was impossible by engaging in a propaganda war. Nadir Khan accused Amanullah Khan of kufr with his pro western policies.

== Mohammed Zahir Shah, 1933–1973 ==
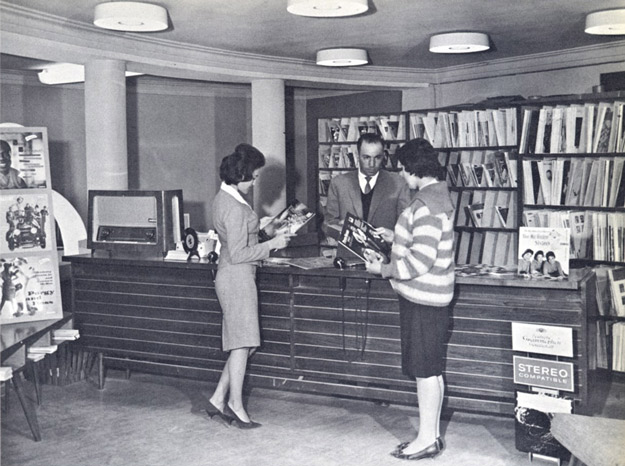
A 1950s or 1960s record store in Afghanistan, showing the increasing Western influence at the time, particularly in Kabul.

In 1933, after the assassination of Nadir Khan, Mohammed Zahir Shah became king. In 1940, the Afghan legation in Berlin asked that if Germany won the Second World War would the Reich give all of British India up to the Indus river to Afghanistan. Ernst von Weizsäcker, the State Secretary at the Auswärtiges Amt wrote to the German minister in Kabul on 3 October 1940:

"The Afghan minister called on me on September 30 and conveyed greetings from his minister president, as well as their good wishes for a favourable outcome of the war. He inquired whether German aims in Asia coincided with Afghan hopes; he alluded to the oppression of Arab countries and referred to the 15m Afghans (Pashtuns, mainly in the North West Frontier province) who were forced to suffer on Indian territory.

My statement that Germany's goal was the liberation of the peoples of the region referred to, who were under the British yoke was received with satisfaction by the Afghan minister. He stated that justice for Afghanistan would be created only when the country's frontier had been extended to the Indus; this would also apply if India should secede from Britain. The Afghan remarked that Afghanistan had given proof of her loyal attitude by vigorously resisting English pressure to break off relations with Germany."

No Afghan government ever accepted the Durand Line which divided the ethnically Pashtun population into the North-West Frontier Province of the British Raj (modern northwestern Pakistan) and Afghanistan, and it was the hope of Kabul that if Germany won the war, then all of the Pashtun people might be united into one realm.

== See also ==
- Western imperialism in Asia
- Reforms of Amanullah Khan and civil war
- Aurora Nilsson
