= 1956 Melton by-election =

UK Parliamentary by-election

The 1956 Melton by-election was held on 19 December 1956 after the resignation of the incumbent Conservative MP Anthony Nutting over a disagreement with his party over the Suez Crisis. The by-election was won by the Conservative candidate Mervyn Pike.

Melton by-election, 1956
Party	Candidate	Votes	%	±%
Conservative	Mervyn Pike	19,133	53.29	−7.63
Labour	Ted Masters	16,771	46.71	+7.63
Majority		2,362	6.58	−15.26
Turnout		35,904		
Conservative hold		Swing	-7.63	
