= Henry de Rosenbach Walker =

Henry de Rosenbach Walker (30 May 1867 – 31 July 1923) was a British Liberal Party politician and author.

== Background ==
He was a son of R. F. Walker of Shooter's Hill, Kent and Marie von Rosenbach, of Karritz, Estonia. He was educated at Winchester School and Trinity College, Cambridge. In 1900 he married Maud Eleanor Chute, of Basingstoke. They had three daughters.

== Career ==
He worked as a clerk in the Foreign Office from 1889 to 1892. He travelled extensively in Russia, Central Asia, the Far East, North America, the West Indies, and the Antipodes. From his travels he had two books published; Australasian Democracy in 1897 and The West Indies and the Empire in 1901. He stood as a Liberal candidate for parliament on four occasions. First he contested a Liberal seat, the Stowmarket division of Suffolk in 1895, losing to the Conservatives. He then contested the marginal dual member seat of Plymouth in 1900 and finished in fourth place. He was then elected Liberal MP for the Melton Division of Leicestershire in 1906, gaining the seat from the Conservatives.

General election 1906: Melton Electorate 15,815
Party	Candidate	Votes	%	±%
Liberal	Henry de Rosenbach Walker	7,800	56.4	+8.2
Conservative	Arthur Hazlerigg	6,033	43.6	−8.2
Majority		1,767	12.8	16.4
Turnout			87.5	+7.5
Liberal gain from Conservative		Swing	+8.2	

This was the first occasion that Melton had been won by a Liberal since it was created in 1885. He successfully defended Melton at the general election of January 1910 by a majority of just 123 votes. However, he chose not to defend his seat at the December 1910 General Election. He did not stand for parliament again. He was elected to the London County Council as a Liberal Party backed Progressive candidate for St Pancras East in 1913. He was made a Member of the London War Pensions Committee in 1916. He served one full term as a Councillor until he was appointed an Alderman in 1919. He served as an Alderman until his death. In 1914 he had published The Need for the Parliament Act.

== Sources ==
- Who Was Who
- British parliamentary election results 1885–1918, Craig, F. W. S.

Parliament of the United Kingdom
Preceded by Lord Cecil Manners	Member of Parliament for Melton; 1906–December 1910	Succeeded by Charles Yate
