= Edward Manners =

Edward Manners may refer to:

- Edward Manners, 3rd Earl of Rutland (1548–1587) English nobleman and son of Henry Manners, 2nd Earl of Rutland
- Lord Edward Manners (1864–1903), British Conservative politician, son of the 7th Duke of Rutland
