= Lindsay Everard =

Sir William Lindsay Everard
- Born: 13 March 1891; Knighton, Leicester, England
- Died: 11 March 1949 (aged 57); Torquay, Devon, England
- Occupation: Brewer
- Spouse: Cornelia Ione Kathleen Beresford-Armstrong

Sir William Lindsay Everard (13 March 1891 – 11 March 1949) was a brewer, politician, and philanthropist from Leicestershire, United Kingdom. As the founder and supporter of the Ratcliffe Aerodrome, Sir Lindsay was a pioneer aviator, knighted for his crucial efforts in World War II with the Air Transport Auxiliary (ATA). He controlled Everards Brewery for nearly 25 years and was a member of parliament.

== Pioneer aviator ==
Wartime aviation has changed the course of history and Sir Lindsay Everard is an important contributor to its development. In 1930, Sir Lindsay opened Ratcliffe Aerodrome on 45 acres (180,000 m^{2}) near his estate and Ratcliffe College. He had become President of the Leicester Aeroclub in 1928, purchasing the club a de Havilland Gipsy Moth in 1929. Named "The Quorn", the club used Carts Field at Desford. A large air show brought 30,000 spectators to the site. Sir Lindsay purchased a de Havilland Puss Moth that he named "The Leicestershire", and sold in July 1932. He also favoured the Percival Gull Four P.1.B Mk. IIa.

Ratcliffe Aerodrome opened with a 'Grand Air Pageant' on 6 September 1930. Famed aviator Amy Johnson made an unexpected trip from London to participate with Sir Sefton Brancker, Director of Civil Aviation. Some 5000 spectators were treated to a show with 100 planes and staged bombings of Chinese pirates. There was one crash, but no one was killed. Ratcliffe Aerodrome was one of the finest in civil aviation with a comfortable clubhouse and an outdoor pool. The hangars were first-class and the many air shows and displays had the atmosphere of a garden party.

Sir Lindsay was not a pilot himself, but hired personal pilots to travel throughout the world and participate in air racing events. He owned a de Havilland Dragon, an 8-seat aircraft, with which they won the Oasis Trophy in Cairo. With pilot Lt. Com. Phillips he won the Grosvenor Cup air race. Among his personal pilots were Winifred Spooner, a celebrated woman aviator, and Albert Codling, Sir Lindsay's Chief Inspector responsible for the maintenance of all his aircraft. Sir Lindsay was supportive of every aspect of aviation, including gliders. He was the first president of the Model Aero Club. His airmail postage stamp collection was sold by H.R. Harmer of London on 19 and 20 October 1953 in 530 lots.

The County Flying Club was formed at Ratcliffe and in 1938 moved to a field at Rearsby on land owned by Sir Lindsay. Another member of the County Flying Club, Alexander Lance Wykes, was the managing director of Crowthers Limited, a Thurmaston company, that manufactured textile machinery. In 1938, Wykes negotiated a licence agreement with American manufacturer Taylorcraft to build a light aeroplane in England. It was designated the Taylorcraft "Plus C" model and the first one built was brought by road to Sir Lindsay's Aerodrome where it made its maiden flight on 3 May 1939. This aircraft became an important part of the war effort in World War II and a production order of 100 aircraft designated the Taylorcraft-Auster Mk 1 was placed in 1942. The Auster continued to be an important and popular plane long after the war.

With the onset of World War II, civil flying was suspended on 31 August 1939. Ratcliffe Aerodrome had a central location that made it an important field for the ATA, a network of civilian pilots that ferried new aircraft from the factories and those that needed repair. Ratcliffe Aerodrome was ferry pool no. 6 of the original 14 started in 1942. The Aerodrome grew larger during the war, adding new facilities. Some 50,000 ferry flights passed through this ideal staging ground.

When the ATA was disbanded, the event was commemorated by an air show on 6 October 1945 that included Geoffrey de Havilland. Sir Lindsay was knighted during the war for services to aviation and commerce. The Leicester Aeroclub reformed in 1947 and drew a crowd of 10,000 for an event in 1949. Sir Lindsay died that year and his estate was sold to non-flyers. Ratcliffe Aerodrome closed on 25 March 1950. It fell into disrepair with some of the buildings being used as barns for the surrounding farms.

== Career and Philanthropy ==
Sir Lindsay took over the business of Everards Brewery in 1925 and remained in that position until his death in 1949. Everards was founded in 1849 by William Everard, was managed by his son Thomas, and then Sir Lindsay. The brewery specialises in ales and has more than 150 pubs around Leicestershire. The brewery was in Burton upon Trent when Sir Lindsay was in control. His son Tony Everard ran the business from 1949 to 1988 and saw the business move back to Leicester.

Sir Lindsay was elected High Sheriff of Leicestershire in 1924. That same year (and in 1929, 1931, and 1935) Sir Lindsay was elected the Member of Parliament for Melton as a Conservative. In 1924 he also played a first-class cricket match for Leicestershire.

Sir Everard offered wide support to the community of Leicestershire. His contributions of land and resources to the nascent civil flying clubs in the area are detailed above. In 1927, Sir Lindsay acquired Ulverscroft Priory, a mid-13th century Augustinian house, preserving the decaying ruins from total destruction. In 1930, Sir Lindsay built Bradgate Hall to replace the wooden restaurant used for village events.

== Personal ==
Sir William Lindsay Everard was born on 13 March 1891 in Knighton, Leicester and attended Harrow School and Trinity College, Cambridge.

He resided in Ratcliffe Hall in Ratcliffe on the Wreake and was the owner of two Bentley motor cars including reference SB2754 which was delivered new to Sir Lindsay in 1929. Sir Lindsay married Cornelia Ione Kathleen Beresford-Armstrong, Lady Everard, daughter of Captain Marcus Beresford-Armstrong. Their children included Patrick Anthony William Beresford Everard and Bettyne Ione and granddaughters Lady Denyne Butler. Sir Lindsay died on 11 March 1949 in Torquay, Devon, aged 57.

== Sources ==
- Ratcliffe Aerodrome History at Ratcliffe College.
- Leicestershire Aero Club
- Everards Brewery
- The Story of the Air Transport Auxiliary. E.C. Cheeseman.
- The Forgotten Pilots. Lettice Curtis.
- Aviation in Leicestershire and Rutland. Roy Bonser.

== Notes ==
Parliament of the United Kingdom
Preceded by Charles Yate	Member of Parliament for Melton; 1924 – 1945	Succeeded by Anthony Nutting
