= Kazi Saad-ud-Din Khan =

Politician in Afghanistan

Governor of Herat Province
- In office 1887 – December 1904
- Monarchs: Abdur Rahman Khan; Habibullah Khan
- Preceded by: Nazir Muhammad Sarwar Khan
- Succeeded by: Sardar Muhammad Sarwar Khan

Chief Justice
- In office 1914–?

Personal details
- Born: Saad-Ud-Din c. 1848
- Died: after 1914

Saad-ud-Din (Pashto/Dari: سعدالدين خان), later Kazi Saad-ud-Din Khan (c. 1848 – after 1914), was a politician in Afghanistan under Abdur Rahman Khan and Habibullah Khan; he was, for a time, Habibullah Khan's father-in-law. He was the Governor of Herat for eighteen years, between 1887 and 1904, and he became the Chief Justice in 1914. He was bestowed the title "Khan e Ulum" (خان علوم), which translates to "Master of Knowledge".

== Early career ==
Saad-ud-Din was a member of the Barakzai dynasty. He was born in about 1848, the son of Khan-i-Mulla, Chief Kazi of Afghanistan. Saad-ud-Din was appointed Kazi of Kandahar during the Second Anglo-Afghan War and retained the post for a while afterwards, but was eventually recalled to Kabul in disgrace according to British sources.

== Afghan Boundary Commission ==
In September 1884, he took up a new post as Afghan Representative with the Afghan Boundary Commission of 1884–6, in which capacity he greatly aggravated the British officers. Captain Pelham James Maitland wrote of him that he was "hitherto a person of no particular importance. He was believed to be honest, and devoted to the Amir Abdul Rahman. These qualities proved to be counterbalanced by excessive bigotry, narrow-mindedness, and ignorance of the world. Kazi Saduddin, now [1888] Governor of Herat, is a fanatic, meaning well to his country, and his master, but without education or ability, and therefore capable, under some circumstances of doing considerable mischief. He began at once by instituting a species of terrorism, based on the asserted ill-will of the people, particularly the soldiery. By means of this, he not only succeeded in making the Commission virtually prisoners in their own camp, but frequently disturbed those responsible for its safety by raising bugbears, the true nature of which they were unable to discern." Captain Yate wrote in 1886 that Saad-ud-Din was "doing his utmost to thwart our best endeavours for the good of the Amir and his dominions. Instead of friends and protectors, he would wish to make us out treacherous deceivers, and he has doubtless done his best to malign us and minimise the effect of all that the British Government has done for Afghanistan... Any unfortunate man caught doing any of us the slightest service has always been flogged or otherwise severely punished."

== Governor of Herat ==
After the conclusion of the Boundary Commission's work along the border of Herat Province, he returned to Kabul in October 1886, whereupon the incumbent Governor of Herat, Nazir Muhammad Sarwar Khan, was dismissed from his post and arrested in November. Whether Kazi Saad-ud-Din had a role in the intrigue that brought down Sarwar Khan is unknown, but he was the man in the best position to inform on the outgoing governor, and he was also the primary beneficiary, becoming the new Governor of Herat in 1887. He held the post until 1904.

Kazi Saad-ud-Din was reported to be well read and learned, especially in theology. In 1903–04 he hindered Henry Dobbs' movements on the Herat border as much as possible, blaming the British for desecration of a graveyard. His daughter was married to Amir Habibullah and divorced in 1903. His influence with the Amir declined from the time of his daughter's divorce. In December 1904 he was superseded as governor by Sardar Muhammad Sarwar Khan and summoned to Kabul.

== Later career and descendants ==
Appointed Khan-i-Mulla and Kazi of Kabul, May 1905. Member of the Majlis-iShura. Still Kazi in Kabul in 1908 where he was becoming popular. Appointed Chief Justice, Qazi-ul-Quzat, 1914. He had eleven sons: Abdul Shakur Khan (who became Qazi-ul-Quzat after his death), Abdul Ghani Khan, Abdul Karim Khan (who held a series of governorships), Nur Ahmad Khan, Muhammad Hussain Khan, Ahmad Ali Khan, Nasr ud-Din Khan, Ghulam Hussain Khan, Muhammad Faruq Khan, Muhammad Abu-Bakr Khan, Muhammad Uthman Khan.

He was head of the Ulumi family and Karirn branch of the Ulumis.
