= Mervyn Pike =

British politician and peer (1918–2004)

The Right Honourable The Baroness Pike DBE

Parliamentary Under-Secretary of State for Home Affairs
- In office 1 March 1963 – 16 October 1964
- Prime Minister: Harold Macmillan; Alec Douglas-Home
- Preceded by: Charles Fletcher-Cooke
- Succeeded by: George Thomas

Assistant Postmaster-General
- In office 22 October 1959 – 1 March 1963
- Prime Minister: Harold Macmillan
- Preceded by: Kenneth Thompson
- Succeeded by: Ray Mawby

Member of the House of Lords
- Lord Temporal
- Life peerage 15 May 1974 – 11 January 2004

Member of Parliament for Melton
- In office 19 December 1956 – 8 February 1974
- Preceded by: Anthony Nutting
- Succeeded by: Michael Latham

Personal details
- Born: Irene Mervyn Parnicott Pike; 16 September 1918 Castleford, Yorkshire, England
- Died: 11 January 2004 (aged 85) Kelso, Scottish Borders
- Party: Conservative
- Education: University of Reading

Military service
- Allegiance: United Kingdom
- Branch/service: Royal Air Force
- Unit: Women's Auxiliary Air Force

Irene Mervyn Parnicott Pike, Baroness Pike, DBE (16 September 1918 – 11 January 2004) was a British Conservative politician. The name by which she came to be known, Mervyn, had been the name of her father's best friend, who was to have been her godfather; when he was killed in action, a few days before she was born, her father decided that the baby would take his name.

== Early life ==
Born in Castleford, Yorkshire, into a family of Castleford pottery manufacturers, Pike was educated at Hunmanby Hall (East Riding of Yorkshire) and at Reading University and served with the Women's Auxiliary Air Force during World War II. She was managing director of a firm of pottery manufacturers.

== Career ==
Pike contested Pontefract in 1951 and Leek in 1955 without success. She was elected Member of Parliament (MP) for Melton at a by-election in December 1956. She held several positions including Assistant Postmaster-General from 1959 to 1963, joint Under-Secretary of State for the Home Department from 1963 to 1964 and Chair of the WRVS from 1974 to 1981 and the Broadcasting Complaints Commission from 1981 to 1985.

== Awards ==
Pike was created a life peer on 15 May 1974 as Baroness Pike, of Melton in Leicestershire, and was appointed a Dame Commander of the Order of the British Empire (DBE) in the 1981 Birthday Honours.

Coat of arms of Mervyn Pike
Escutcheon Or on a cross Gules a churchwarden's staff headed of a mitre Or on a chief Sable a castleford fine stoneware teapot Proper. Supporters On either side a fox that on the dexter gorged with a wreath of ivy and that on the sinister with a wreath of rosemary Proper and each resting the interior hind foot on a portcullis Or. Compartment A grassy mount Proper. Motto Faithful Endeavour Orders Order of the British Empire

== Death ==
She died in 2004, unmarried, at a nursing home in Kelso, Scottish Borders, aged 85, from pneumonia following a stroke.

Parliament of the United Kingdom
Preceded by Anthony Nutting	Member of Parliament for Melton; 1956 – February 1974	Succeeded by Michael Latham
