= Melton (constituency) =

Parliamentary constituency in the United Kingdom, 1885–1983

- Former county constituency for the House of Commons
- County: Leicestershire
- Major settlements: Melton Mowbray

1885–1983
- Seats: One
- Created from: North Leicestershire
- Replaced by: Rutland & Melton, Loughborough and Bosworth

Melton was a county constituency centred on the town of Melton Mowbray in Leicestershire. It returned one Member of Parliament (MP) to the House of Commons of the Parliament of the United Kingdom.

The constituency was created for the 1885 general election, when the former two-seat Northern Division of Leicestershire was replaced by two new single-seat county divisions: Melton and Loughborough. It was abolished for the 1983 general election, when it was succeeded by the Rutland and Melton constituency.

== Boundaries ==
1885–1918: The Sessional Divisions of Belvoir and Melton Mowbray, and parts of the Sessional Divisions of Leicester and Loughborough.

1918–1950: The Urban Districts of Melton Mowbray, Quorndon, and Thurmaston, and the Rural Districts of Barrow-upon-Soar, Belvoir, Billesdon, and Melton Mowbray.

1950–1974: The Urban District of Melton Mowbray, and the Rural Districts of Barrow-upon-Soar, Billesdon, and Melton and Belvoir.

1974–1983: The Urban District of Melton Mowbray, and the Rural Districts of Barrow-upon-Soar, and Melton and Belvoir.

As its name suggested, the main settlement in the constituency was Melton Mowbray.

== Members of Parliament ==
| Year | Member | Party |
|---|---|---|
| 1885 | Lord John Manners | Conservative |
| 1888 | Marquess of Granby | Conservative |
| 1895 | Lord Edward Manners | Conservative |
| 1900 | Lord Cecil Manners | Conservative |
| 1906 | Henry Walker | Liberal |
| 1910 | Sir Charles Yate | Conservative |
| 1924 | Sir Lindsay Everard | Unionist |
| 1945 | Sir Anthony Nutting | Conservative |
| 1956 | Mervyn Pike | Conservative |
| 1974 | Michael Latham | Conservative |
| 1983 | constituency abolished | |

== Elections ==
=== Elections in the 1880s ===
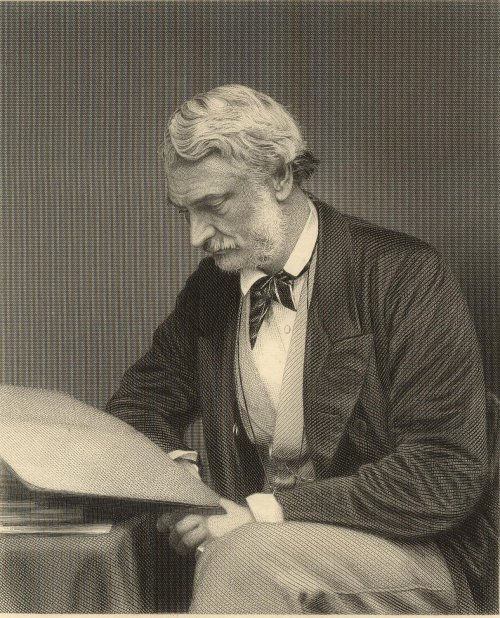
Lord John

General election 1885: Melton
| Party | Candidate | Votes | % | ±% |
|---|---|---|---|---|
| Conservative | Lord John Manners | 5,150 | 57.1 | |
| Liberal | Daniel Rowlinson Ratcliff | 3,868 | 42.9 | |
| Majority | | 1,282 | 14.2 | |
| Turnout | | 9,018 | 88.5 | |
| Registered electors | | 10,190 | | |
| Conservative win (new seat) | | | | |

General election 1886: Melton
| Party | Candidate | Votes | % | ±% |
|---|---|---|---|---|
| Conservative | Lord John Manners | Unopposed | | |
| Conservative hold | | | | |

Manners was appointed Chancellor of the Duchy of Lancaster, requiring a by-election.

By-election, 13 Aug 1886: Melton
| Party | Candidate | Votes | % | ±% |
|---|---|---|---|---|
| Conservative | Lord John Manners | Unopposed | | |
| Conservative hold | | | | |

Manners succeeded to the peerage, becoming Duke of Rutland, causing a by-election.

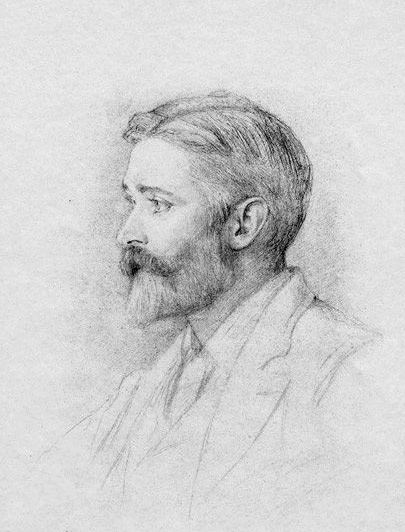
Granby

By-election, 21 Mar 1888: Melton
| Party | Candidate | Votes | % | ±% |
|---|---|---|---|---|
| Conservative | Marquess of Granby | Unopposed | | |
| Conservative hold | | | | |

=== Elections in the 1890s ===
General election 1892: Melton
| Party | Candidate | Votes | % | ±% |
|---|---|---|---|---|
| Conservative | Marquess of Granby | Unopposed | | |
| Conservative hold | | | | |

Lord Edward

General election 1895: Melton
| Party | Candidate | Votes | % | ±% |
|---|---|---|---|---|
| Conservative | Lord Edward Manners | 5,636 | 56.8 | N/A |
| Liberal | Arthur Wakerley | 4,283 | 43.2 | New |
| Majority | | 1,353 | 13.6 | N/A |
| Turnout | | 9,919 | 83.4 | N/A |
| Registered electors | | 11,894 | | |
| Conservative hold | | Swing | N/A | |

=== Elections in the 1900s ===
General election 1900: Melton
| Party | Candidate | Votes | % | ±% |
|---|---|---|---|---|
| Conservative | Lord Cecil Manners | 5,585 | 51.8 | −5.0 |
| Liberal | Arthur Wakerley | 5,193 | 48.2 | +5.0 |
| Majority | | 392 | 3.6 | −10.0 |
| Turnout | | 10,778 | 80.0 | −3.4 |
| Registered electors | | 11,894 | | |
| Conservative hold | | Swing | −5.0 | |

General election 1906: Melton
| Party | Candidate | Votes | % | ±% |
|---|---|---|---|---|
| Liberal | Henry de Rosenbach Walker | 7,800 | 56.4 | +8.2 |
| Conservative | Arthur Hazlerigg | 6,033 | 43.6 | −8.2 |
| Majority | | 1,767 | 12.8 | N/A |
| Turnout | | 13,833 | 87.5 | +7.5 |
| Registered electors | | 15,815 | | |
| Liberal gain from Conservative | | Swing | +8.2 | |

=== Elections in the 1910s ===
General election January 1910: Melton
| Party | Candidate | Votes | % | ±% |
|---|---|---|---|---|
| Liberal | Henry de Rosenbach Walker | 7,748 | 50.4 | −6.0 |
| Conservative | Charles Yate | 7,625 | 49.6 | +6.0 |
| Majority | | 123 | 0.8 | −12.0 |
| Turnout | | 15,373 | 91.1 | +3.6 |
| Liberal hold | | Swing | −6.0 | |

General election December 1910: Melton
| Party | Candidate | Votes | % | ±% |
|---|---|---|---|---|
| Conservative | Charles Yate | 7,599 | 51.3 | +1.7 |
| Liberal | Edward Dunne | 7,227 | 48.7 | −1.7 |
| Majority | | 372 | 2.6 | N/A |
| Turnout | | 14,826 | 87.9 | −3.2 |
| Conservative gain from Liberal | | Swing | +1.7 | |

General Election 1914–15:

Another General Election was required to take place before the end of 1915. The political parties had been making preparations for an election to take place and by July 1914, the following candidates had been selected;

- Unionist: Charles Yate
- Liberal: Arthur Richardson

General election 1918: Melton
| Party | | Candidate | Votes | % | ±% |
|---|---|---|---|---|---|
| C | Unionist | Charles Yate | Unopposed | | |
| | Unionist hold | | | | |
C indicates candidate endorsed by the coalition government.

=== Elections in the 1920s ===
General election 1922: Melton
| Party | Candidate | Votes | % | ±% |
|---|---|---|---|---|
| Unionist | Charles Yate | 13,341 | 53.6 | N/A |
| Liberal | Arthur Richardson | 11,550 | 46.4 | New |
| Majority | | 1,791 | 7.2 | N/A |
| Turnout | | 24,891 | 79.9 | N/A |
| Unionist hold | | Swing | N/A | |

General election 1923: Melton
| Party | Candidate | Votes | % | ±% |
|---|---|---|---|---|
| Unionist | Charles Yate | 13,239 | 50.1 | −3.5 |
| Liberal | Arthur Richardson | 13,195 | 49.9 | +3.5 |
| Majority | | 44 | 0.2 | −7.0 |
| Turnout | | 26,434 | 80.9 | +1.0 |
| Unionist hold | | Swing | −3.5 | |

General election 1924: Melton
| Party | Candidate | Votes | % | ±% |
|---|---|---|---|---|
| Unionist | Lindsay Everard | 17,090 | 58.9 | +8.8 |
| Liberal | Arthur Richardson | 11,934 | 41.1 | −8.8 |
| Majority | | 5,156 | 17.8 | +17.6 |
| Turnout | | 29,024 | 84.3 | +3.4 |
| Unionist hold | | Swing | +8.8 | |

General election 1929: Melton
| Party | Candidate | Votes | % | ±% |
|---|---|---|---|---|
| Unionist | Lindsay Everard | 18,707 | 47.4 | −11.5 |
| Liberal | Guy Halford Dixon | 14,144 | 35.9 | −5.2 |
| Labour | A. E. Stubbs | 6,569 | 16.7 | New |
| Majority | | 4,563 | 11.5 | −6.3 |
| Turnout | | 32,851 | 83.2 | −1.1 |
| Unionist hold | | Swing | −3.2 | |

=== Elections in the 1930s ===
General election 1931: Melton
| Party | Candidate | Votes | % | ±% |
|---|---|---|---|---|
| Conservative | Lindsay Everard | 30,355 | 78.9 | +31.5 |
| Labour | A. E. Stubbs | 8,100 | 21.1 | +4.4 |
| Majority | | 22,255 | 57.8 | +46.3 |
| Turnout | | 38,455 | 76.4 | −6.8 |
| Conservative hold | | Swing | | |

- Liberal candidate Guy Halford Dixon withdrew at the start of the campaign

General election 1935: Melton
| Party | Candidate | Votes | % | ±% |
|---|---|---|---|---|
| Conservative | Lindsay Everard | 26,325 | 67.4 | −11.5 |
| Labour | A. E. Stubbs | 12,724 | 32.6 | +11.5 |
| Majority | | 13,601 | 34.9 | −22.9 |
| Turnout | | 39,029 | 71.9 | −4.5 |
| Conservative hold | | Swing | −11.5 | |

General Election 1939–40: Another General Election was required to take place before the end of 1940. The political parties had been making preparations for an election to take place and by the Autumn of 1939, the following candidates had been selected;

- Conservative: Lindsay Everard
- Labour: Clare Hollingworth
- Liberal: J. T. Pepper

=== Elections in the 1940s ===
General election 1945: Melton
| Party | Candidate | Votes | % | ±% |
|---|---|---|---|---|
| Conservative | Anthony Nutting | 23,772 | 46.0 | −21.4 |
| Labour | Archibald Crawford | 18,379 | 35.6 | +3.0 |
| Liberal | Brian Melton Butcher | 9,510 | 18.4 | New |
| Majority | | 5,393 | 10.4 | −24.5 |
| Turnout | | 51,661 | 76.7 | +4.8 |
| Conservative hold | | Swing | −12.2 | |

=== Elections in the 1950s ===
General election 1950: Melton
| Party | Candidate | Votes | % | ±% |
|---|---|---|---|---|
| Conservative | Anthony Nutting | 26,177 | 51.01 | |
| Labour | Archibald Crawford | 19,621 | 38.24 | |
| Liberal | Wilfrid Horace Kirby | 5,518 | 10.75 | New |
| Majority | | 6,556 | 12.77 | |
| Turnout | | 51,316 | 87.46 | |
| Conservative hold | | Swing | | |

General election 1951: Melton
| Party | Candidate | Votes | % | ±% |
|---|---|---|---|---|
| Conservative | Anthony Nutting | 28,689 | 56.26 | |
| Labour | Kenneth Frank Urwin | 22,308 | 43.74 | |
| Majority | | 6,381 | 12.52 | |
| Turnout | | 50,997 | 85.46 | |
| Conservative hold | | Swing | | |

General election 1955: Melton
| Party | Candidate | Votes | % | ±% |
|---|---|---|---|---|
| Conservative | Anthony Nutting | 30,074 | 60.92 | |
| Labour | Kenneth Frank Urwin | 19,294 | 39.08 | |
| Majority | | 10,780 | 21.84 | |
| Turnout | | 49,368 | 80.95 | |
| Conservative hold | | Swing | | |

1956 Melton by-election
| Party | Candidate | Votes | % | ±% |
|---|---|---|---|---|
| Conservative | Mervyn Pike | 19,133 | 53.29 | −7.63 |
| Labour | Edward John Masters | 16,771 | 46.71 | +7.63 |
| Majority | | 2,362 | 6.58 | −15.26 |
| Turnout | | 35,904 | | |
| Conservative hold | | Swing | −7.63 | |

General election 1959: Melton
| Party | Candidate | Votes | % | ±% |
|---|---|---|---|---|
| Conservative | Mervyn Pike | 34,997 | 61.21 | |
| Labour | Charles W Shepherd | 22,176 | 38.79 | |
| Majority | | 12,821 | 22.42 | |
| Turnout | | 57,173 | 81.40 | |
| Conservative hold | | Swing | | |

=== Elections in the 1960s ===
General election 1964: Melton
| Party | Candidate | Votes | % | ±% |
|---|---|---|---|---|
| Conservative | Mervyn Pike | 32,842 | 51.47 | |
| Labour | D. J. Williams | 19,578 | 30.68 | |
| Liberal | Garth V. J. Pratt | 11,392 | 17.85 | New |
| Majority | | 13,264 | 20.79 | |
| Turnout | | 65,684 | 82.57 | |
| Conservative hold | | Swing | | |

General election 1966: Melton
| Party | Candidate | Votes | % | ±% |
|---|---|---|---|---|
| Conservative | Mervyn Pike | 30,776 | 48.04 | |
| Labour | John R. Frears | 23,181 | 36.18 | |
| Liberal | Garth V. J. Pratt | 10,108 | 15.78 | |
| Majority | | 7,595 | 11.86 | |
| Turnout | | 64,065 | 80.47 | |
| Conservative hold | | Swing | | |

=== Elections in the 1970s ===
General election 1970: Melton
| Party | Candidate | Votes | % | ±% |
|---|---|---|---|---|
| Conservative | Mervyn Pike | 38,782 | 56.08 | |
| Labour | Kevin Wood | 20,907 | 30.23 | |
| Liberal | John B. Pick | 9,465 | 13.69 | |
| Majority | | 17,785 | 25.85 | |
| Turnout | | 69,154 | 75.94 | |
| Conservative hold | | Swing | | |

General election February 1974: Melton
| Party | Candidate | Votes | % | ±% |
|---|---|---|---|---|
| Conservative | Michael Latham | 32,239 | 47.44 | −8.64 |
| Liberal | John Barclay Pick | 19,490 | 28.68 | +14.99 |
| Labour | Royston William Samuel Mayhew | 16,228 | 23.88 | −6.35 |
| Majority | | 12,749 | 18.76 | −7.09 |
| Turnout | | 67,957 | 83.49 | +7.55 |
| Conservative hold | | Swing | | |

General election October 1974: Melton
| Party | Candidate | Votes | % | ±% |
|---|---|---|---|---|
| Conservative | Michael Latham | 30,943 | 48.92 | +1.48 |
| Labour | David John Knaggs | 16,747 | 26.47 | +2.59 |
| Liberal | John Barclay Pick | 15,567 | 24.61 | −4.07 |
| Majority | | 14,196 | 22.45 | +3.69 |
| Turnout | | 63,257 | 77.03 | −6.46 |
| Conservative hold | | Swing | −0.56 | |

General election 1979: Melton
| Party | Candidate | Votes | % | ±% |
|---|---|---|---|---|
| Conservative | Michael Latham | 40,242 | 58.56 | +9.64 |
| Labour | Mel Read | 15,882 | 23.11 | −3.36 |
| Liberal | David John Farrer | 12,596 | 18.33 | −6.28 |
| Majority | | 24,360 | 35.45 | +13.00 |
| Turnout | | 68,720 | 78.70 | +1.67 |
| Conservative hold | | Swing | +6.50 | |
