= Janetta Manners, Duchess of Rutland =

English aristocrat and writer

Her Grace The Duchess of Rutland
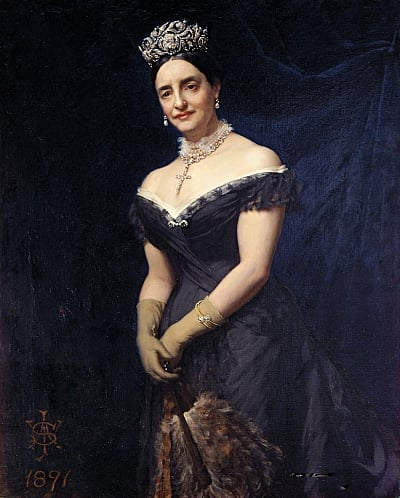
- Born: Janetta Hughan; 11 July 1836
- Died: 8 September 1899 (aged 63); Homburg, Saarland
- Spouse: John Manners, 7th Duke of Rutland (m. 1862; died 1899)
- Children: Lord Edward Manners; Lady Katherine Manners; Lord Cecil Manners; Lord Robert Manners; Lady Victoria Manners; Lady Elizabeth Emily Manners
- Parent(s): Thomas Hughan; Lady Louisa Georgiana Beauclerk
- Relatives: William Beauclerk, 8th Duke of St Albans (grandfather); Thomas Hughan (grandfather)

Janetta Manners, Duchess of Rutland (née Hughan; 8 September 1836 – 11 July 1899) was an English aristocrat and writer.

== Early life ==
Janetta was born on 8 September 1836. She was the eldest daughter and co-heiress of Thomas Hughan, of Airds, Galloway, and the former Lady Louisa Georgiana Beauclerk. Among her siblings were Wilhelmina Mary Hughan (who married Henry Houghton, later Houghton-Hughan) and Justina Louisa Hughan (who married Sir Brydges Henniker, 4th Baronet).

Her father was the only (legitimate) child of Thomas Hughan, slave-trader and MP for East Retford and Dundalk, and Jean Milligan (eldest daughter of Robert Milligan). Her mother was a younger daughter of William Beauclerk, 8th Duke of St Albans and his second wife, Maria Beauclerk, Duchess of St Albans.

== Writing career ==
Before her husband succeeded to the dukedom, and while she was known as Lady John Manners, she wrote several works, all published in Edinburgh by William Blackwood and Sons, including, Some personal recollections of the later years of the Earl of Beaconsfield, K.G. (better known as Prime Minister Benjamin Disraeli), published in 1881, Employment of women in the public service, published in 1882, Encouraging experiences of reading and recreation rooms, and hints how to obtain really good books at moderate prices: Being a sequel to 'Advantages of free libraries and recreation rooms, published in 1886.

== Personal life ==
On 15 May 1862, she became the second wife of Lord John Manners, who served as Chancellor of the Duchy of Lancaster from 16 August 1886 to 11 August 1892 during the reign of Victoria. He was the younger son of John Manners, 5th Duke of Rutland and Lady Elizabeth Howard (a daughter of Frederick Howard, 5th Earl of Carlisle). Together, they lived at Belvoir Castle and were the parents of seven children:

- Lord Edward William John Manners (1864–1903), an MP who died unmarried.
- Lady Katherine Selina Janetta Manners (1866-1900)
- Lord Cecil Reginald John Manners (1868–1945), an unmarried MP who was killed by throwing himself under a train.
- Lord Robert William Orlando Manners (1870–1917), a Lieutenant Colonel in the King's Royal Rifle Corps who was killed during the Great War; he married Mildred Mary (née Buckworth) Buchanan-Riddell, daughter of Rev. Charles P. Buckworth (and widow of Maj. Henry Buchanan-Riddell), in 1902.
- Lady Victoria Alexandrina Elizabeth Dorothy Manners (1876–1933)
- Lady Elizabeth Emily Manners (1878–1924), who married Lord George Scott, son of William Montagu Douglas Scott, 6th Duke of Buccleuch, in 1903.

She brought a Scottish property to the marriage, St Mary's Tower in Dunkeld. In 1888, her husband became the 7th Duke of Rutland upon the death of his unmarried brother Charles, and Janetta became the Duchess of Rutland.

The Duchess died in Homburg on 11 July 1899.
