= Peter Lumsden =

British general (1829–1918)

General Sir Peter Lumsden GCB CSI DL
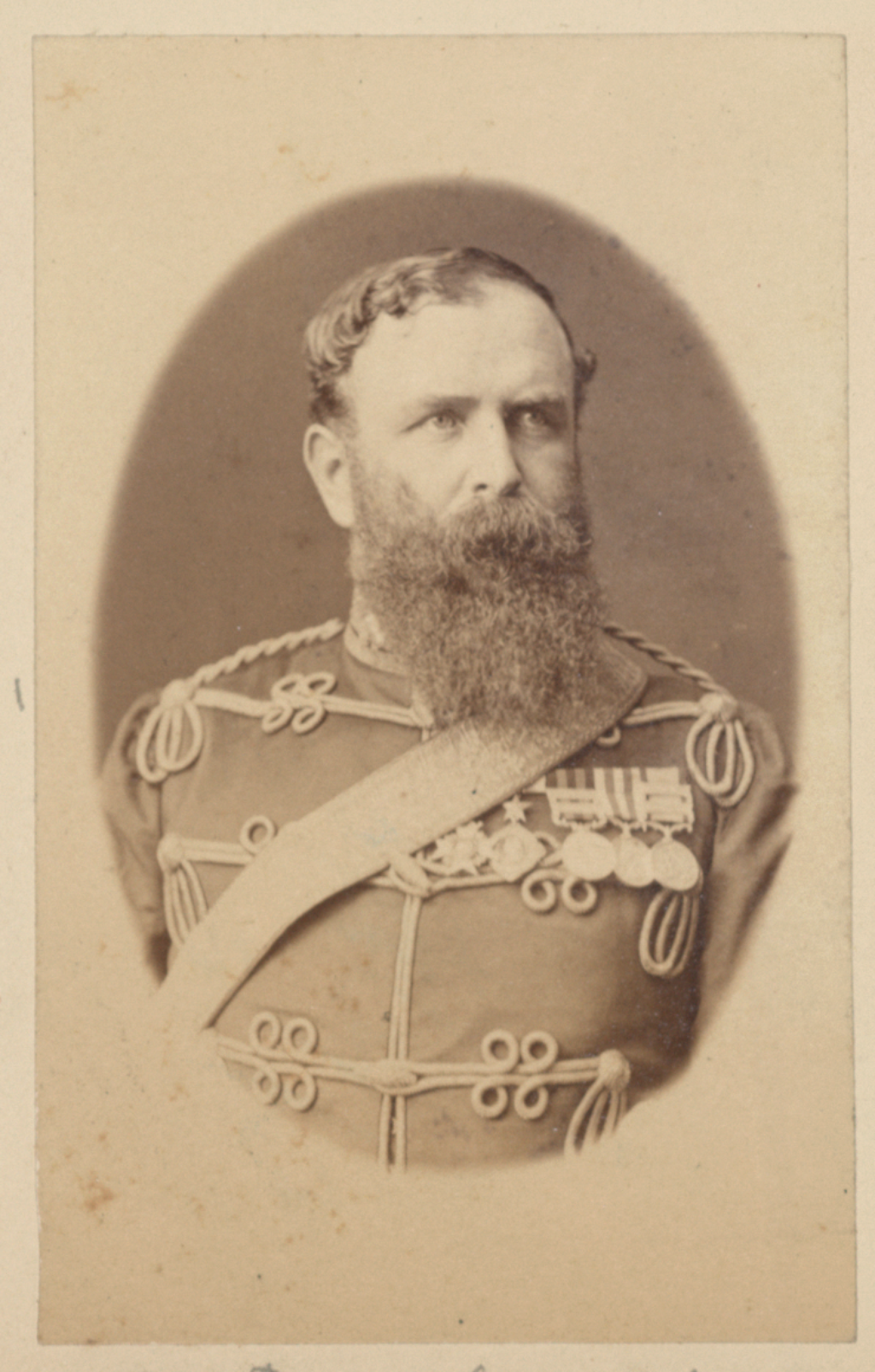
- Lumsden, c. 1879
- Born: 9 November 1829; Belhelvie, Aberdeenshire, Scotland
- Died: 9 November 1918 (aged 89); Dufftown, Banffshire, Scotland
- Relatives: Harry Burnett Lumsden
- Military career
- Allegiance: United Kingdom
- Branch: (British Raj) Indian Army
- Service years: 1847–1887
- Rank: General
- Conflicts: Indian Rebellion of 1857; Second Opium War; Bhutan War; Second Anglo-Afghan War
- Awards: Knight Grand Cross of the Order of the Bath; Companion of the Order of the Star of India; Mentioned in Despatches (6)
- Other work: Justice of the peace

General Sir Peter Stark Lumsden GCB CSI DL (9 November 1829 – 9 November 1918) was a British military officer who served in India. Born in Belhelvie, Aberdeenshire, he was the fourth son of Colonel Thomas Lumsden CB. He studied at Addiscombe Military Seminary, before officially joining military service as an ensign in the 60th Bengal Native Infantry in 1847. From 1852 to 1857 he served on the North-West Frontier, where, among other activities, he participated in the suppression of the Indian Rebellion of 1857 and the capture of Tantya Tope in 1859.

Following his time on the North-West Frontier, Lumsden served as quartermaster general in 1860 during the Second Opium War, where he participated in the capture of both Tang-ku and the Taku Forts. He was promoted to brevet-lieutenant-colonel, before giving his final act of military service in the Bhutan War of 1865. He was promoted again to Adjutant-General of the Indian Army in 1874, and also acted as aide-de-camp to Queen Victoria for eleven years.

In 1883, Lumsden was awarded a Knight Grand Cross of the Order of the Bath and was appointed as a commissioner on the Council of India for 10 years. He represented Britain a year later at the Anglo-Russian Commission for the demarcation of the north-west boundary of Afghanistan, then acted as British representative on the Afghan Frontier Commission. After retiring from military service in 1893, Lumsden served as a justice of the peace in his home county of Aberdeenshire, before dying on his 89th birthday, 9 November 1918, in Dufftown, Banffshire.

== Life and military career ==
=== Early life and North-West Frontier ===
Peter Stark Lumsden was born at Belhelvie Lodge, Belhelvie, Aberdeenshire, on 9 November 1829. He was trained at Addiscombe Military Seminary from the age of 20, and entered the East India Company's Bengal Army in 1847 as an ensign in the 60th Bengal Native Infantry. Between 1852 and 1857 he served on the North-West Frontier in five expeditions against native tribes: the Mohmunds, the Ootman Khel, the Bori Afridis and the Miranzais. He was mentioned in despatches five times and awarded the special thanks of the Local and supreme Governments. From 1857 to 1858 he accompanied a special peace-finding mission to Kandahar with his brother Harry Lumsden. He received thanks from the Government for his work, but returned to India to take part in the suppression of the Indian Mutiny. Lumsden next joined the Central India Field Force at Gwalior under General Sir Robert Napier, and, as assistant quartermaster general under Major-General Hugh Rose, shared in the pursuit and capture of Tantya Tope in 1859, when he was again mentioned in despatches.

=== Second Opium War and Bhutan War ===
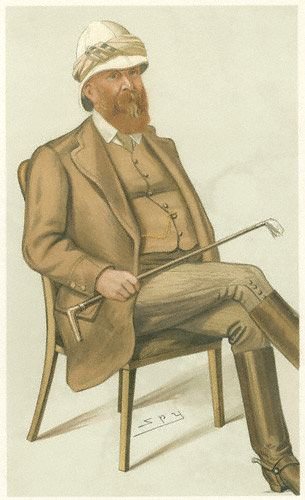
Caricature of Lumsden by Leslie Ward, from Vanity Fair, 8 August 1885

Lumsden's next period of active service was as quartermaster general on the staff of General Napier, who commanded the 2nd division of the expeditionary force to China during the Second Opium War, in 1860. Lumsden took part in the operations of the Anglo-French forces, including the action of Sin-ho, the capture of Tang-ku and the capture of the Taku Forts that led up to the advance on and occupation of Beijing. He was again mentioned in despatches and promoted to brevet-Major and then brevet-lieutenant-colonel.

The final spell of active service in Lumsden's military career was in the Bhutan War of 1865: his later employment was on the staff and in political posts. He was deputy quartermaster general from 1864 to 1868, and quartermaster general of the Indian Army from 1868 to 1873. He was Acting Resident in Hyderabad, 1873, and Adjutant-General, India from 1874 to 1879, when he was appointed Chief of the Staff in India. He also served for eleven years as an aide-de-camp to Queen Victoria.

=== Second Anglo-Afghan War ===
Lumsden served as Chief of Staff to the commander-in-chief, General Sir F. P. Haines, during the Second Anglo-Afghan War, for which he received the Order of the Bath. In 1884, Lumsden returned to the North-West frontier, when he was selected as British representative on the Anglo-Russian Commission for the demarcation of the north-west boundary of Afghanistan. While leading the Commission, he felt he had been given insufficiently clear instructions by the British government, which proved very dangerous as the situation in Afghanistan deteriorated to the brink of war with Russia. He resigned and returned to England in 1885 after the Panjdeh Incident. He left London to represent the British at negotiations with Russia in selecting the Afghan Frontier Commission to determine the Afghan boundary.

Lumsden was appointed a Knight Grand Cross of the Order of the Bath and given a commissioner's seat on the Council of India, which he occupied for a 10-year tenure from 1883. In 1885 he wrote "Countries and Tribes Bordering on the Koh-i-Baba Range", an article for the seventh volume of the journal Proceedings of the Royal Geographical Society and Monthly Record of Geography.

=== Later life ===
Following completion of his tenure on the Council of India, Lumsden retired from military service in 1893. He was placed on the Unemployed Supernumerary List three years later and settled down on Buchromb, an estate that he had purchased near Dufftown. During this time he co-wrote Lumsden of the Guides with G. R. Elsmie. The book detailed the role that his brother, Harry Burnett Lumsden, had played in founding The Corps of the Guides, a regiment of the British Indian Army. He identified himself with local affairs and served as a justice of the peace and as Deputy Lieutenant for Banffshire and Aberdeenshire. Lumsden died on 9 November 1918 in his estate at Dufftown, Banffshire.

== Family ==
Lumsden was married to Mary Marriott in 1862. His father was Colonel Thomas Lumsden CB, with one of his three older brothers being Harry Burnett Lumsden. Thomas Lumsden was a distinguished officer of the Bengal Horse Artillery who had served in the Nepal Campaign of 1814 and at the siege of Hatrass and the capture of Kalunga in 1817. Thomas was himself the son of Harry Lumsden, an advocate in Aberdeen who had bought an estate at Belhelvie. He returned home on leave from the Bengal Army in 1819 to marry Hay Burnett of Elrick, and went on to serve another 23 years in India before retiring to Belhelvie in 1842. They had a total of six sons, of whom three emigrated to Canada and two (Harry and Peter) followed in their father's footsteps by pursuing military careers in India.

Military offices
Preceded by Edwin Johnson	Adjutant-General, India; 1874–1879	Succeeded by George Greaves
