= Lord Cecil Manners =

British politician

Lord Cecil Manners DL
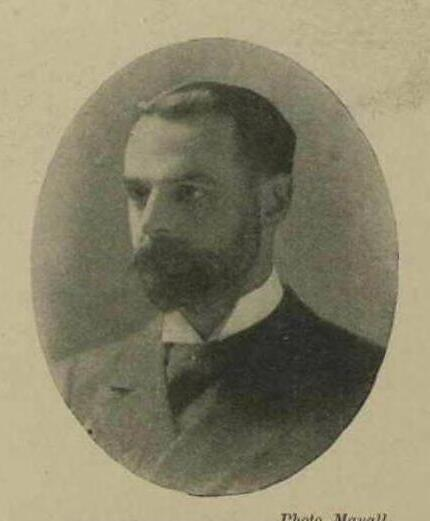

Member of Parliament for Melton
- In office 1900–1906
- Preceded by: Lord Edward Manners
- Succeeded by: Henry de Rosenbach Walker

Personal details
- Born: Cecil Reginald John Manners; 4 February 1868 Camden, London, England
- Died: 8 September 1945 (aged 77) Crowborough, Sussex, England
- Cause of death: Suicide
- Party: Conservative
- Parent(s): John Manners, 7th Duke of Rutland; Janetta Manners, Duchess of Rutland

Lord Cecil Reginald John Manners DL (4 February 1868 – 8 September 1945) was a British Conservative politician and aristocrat.

== Early life ==
Manners was born at 6 Cumberland Terrace, Camden, the second son of John Manners, 7th Duke of Rutland, by his second marriage to Janetta Hughan, daughter of Thomas Hughan. Henry Manners, 8th Duke of Rutland, was his half-brother and Lord Edward Manners his brother. His half-nephew was John Manners, 9th Duke of Rutland. He was educated at Charterhouse School and Trinity College, Cambridge.

== Career ==
In early 1900 he visited South Africa, travelling with troops taking part in the Second Boer War. While acting as a newspaper correspondent, he was among the prisoners captured by the Boers in the course of Lord Roberts' advance on 29 May 1900.

He succeeded his brother as Member of Parliament for Melton in 1900, a seat he held until 1906. On 10 June 1902, he was appointed a Deputy Lieutenant for Derbyshire.

== Personal life ==
Manners died by suicide in September 1945, aged 77, killed by a train at Crowborough railway station. A fully loaded six-chambered revolver, with the hammer cocked, was found on his body. The cause of death was determined to be "decapitation by throwing himself in front of a train while the balance of mind was disturbed."

Parliament of the United Kingdom
Preceded by Lord Edward Manners	Member of Parliament for Melton; 1900–1906	Succeeded by Henry de Rosenbach Walker
