= Anthony Nutting =

British politician (1920–1999)

The Right Honourable Sir Anthony Nutting Bt

Minister of State for Foreign Affairs
- In office 18 October 1954 – 3 November 1956
- Prime Minister: Winston Churchill; Anthony Eden
- Preceded by: Selwyn Lloyd
- Succeeded by: Allan Noble

Parliamentary Under-Secretary of State for Foreign Affairs
- In office 31 October 1951 – 18 October 1954
- Prime Minister: Winston Churchill
- Preceded by: The Lord Henderson and Ernest Davies
- Succeeded by: Robin Turton

Member of Parliament for Melton
- In office 5 July 1945 – 19 December 1956
- Preceded by: Lindsay Everard
- Succeeded by: Mervyn Pike

Personal details
- Born: Harold Anthony Nutting; 11 January 1920 Shrewsbury, Shropshire, England
- Died: 23 February 1999 (aged 79) London, England
- Party: Conservative
- Education: Trinity College, Cambridge

Military service
- Allegiance: United Kingdom
- Branch/service: British Army
- Unit: Leicestershire Yeomanry

Sir Harold Anthony Nutting, 3rd Baronet (11 January 1920 – 23 February 1999) was a British diplomat and Conservative Party politician who served as a Member of Parliament from 1945 until 1956. He was a Minister of State for Foreign Affairs from 1954 until he resigned in 1956 in protest against the Suez invasion.

== Early and private life ==
Nutting was the son of Sir Harold Stanmore Nutting, 2nd Baronet, member of a wealthy family who owned estates in England, Scotland, and Ireland. He was born in Shropshire at the private Shrewsbury Nursing Institution at Quarry House, Shrewsbury, and was educated at Eton College and Trinity College, Cambridge where he studied agriculture.

Before the outbreak of World War II, he joined the Leicestershire Yeomanry as a trooper but was invalided out early in 1940 because of asthma after a steeplechase accident.

Next he entered the Foreign Service. He served as an attaché at the British Embassy in Paris. When France fell, he was assigned to the embassy in Madrid, where he organised escape routes for Allied servicemen caught behind enemy lines from 1940 to 1944. He joined the Embassy in Rome from 1944 to 1945 and was briefly private secretary to Anthony Eden, the then Foreign Secretary. Meanwhile, both of his elder brothers were killed on active duty, and consequently he succeeded to the family baronetcy after the death of their father in 1972.

He married his first wife, Gillian Leonora Strutt, with whom he had three children, John, David and Zara, but they divorced in 1959. He married his second wife, Anne Gunning Parker, in 1961. After her death, in 1991, he later married his third wife, Margarita.

== Early political career ==
At the 1945 general election, at 25, Nutting was elected as the MP for Melton in Leicestershire, an area involved in hunting, and it was said of it that "most of the voters are foxes". He served as chairman of the Young Conservatives (1946–47) and he was the youngest member of Winston Churchill's Government in the 1950s.

He was made a Privy Counsellor in 1954, and he led the British delegation to the United Nations General Assembly and Disarmament Commission in 1954 and 1955. He was an internationalist, an early enthusiast for British membership of the European Economic Community and an Arabist who was a founding member of the Council for the Advancement of Arab-British Understanding (CAABU) in 1967. In the worlds of the political writer Peter Kellner, "He belonged to, and was set fair to lead, a new generation of post-war Tories: moderate, inclusive and internationalist. He preferred the spirit of the United Nations Charter to the ethos of empire. He understood earlier than most of his contemporaries that Britain needed to find a new role in the world".

== Suez Crisis ==
In 1954, he negotiated the final steps of the treaty with President Gamal Abdel Nasser of Egypt under which British troops withdrew from Suez; so when he discovered the joint British and French invasion plan at a meeting on 14 October 1956, just four months after the departure of the last British soldiers, he believed that the mission was mistaken and deceitful. On 31 October, despite attempts by future Prime Minister Harold Macmillan to persuade him not to resign ("you will lead the party one day"), Nutting quit his post as Minister of State for Foreign Affairs. He did not give the customary resignation speech in the House of Commons for security reasons, and his unexplained action proved so unpopular that his constituents forced him to give up his seat in Parliament. He later wrote of feeling suddenly "bereft of friends... a castaway adrift on a sea of anger and recrimination, an object of distrust... torn between loyalty to principle and loyalty to friends and associates."

Nutting supported the idea of moving Iraqi troops into Jordan in response to Israeli military raids in the West Bank that were carried out in response to attacks by the Palestinian fedayeen on Israel. Such a deployment could have provoked war with Israel, as Britain had a defence treaty with Jordan at the time, and Jordan could appeal for British military assistance if there was any Israeli action to stop it. However, when Nutting telephoned Prime Minister Anthony Eden to press the case, Eden angrily told Nutting, "I will not allow you to plunge this country into war merely to satisfy the anti-Jewish spleen of you people in the Foreign Office".

== Later life ==
He kept his silence over the Suez Crisis until 1967. Then, his book, No End of a Lesson, explained that backing the Suez action would have put him in the position of lying to the House of Commons and the United Nations.

"Either I had to tell the whole story as I saw it, or say nothing at all," he wrote. "And as long as any of the chief protagonists of the Suez war still held high office in Britain it would clearly have been a grave disservice to the nation, which they still led and represented in the councils of the world, to have told the whole story." The crisis had caused so much bitterness that even eleven years after his resignation, he came under pressure from the Cabinet Secretary not to proceed and there was even a threat of prosecution under the Official Secrets Act.

He stood one more time, unsuccessfully, in Oldham East in 1964. In his later years, still a political outcast, he divided his time between writing biographies and histories in London, fox hunting in Shropshire and farming at Achentoul, Scotland.

In 1969, Nutting was banned from entering Israel because of a speech to students in Beirut in which he reportedly said that the Palestine question had to be resolved by force, and it was up to Palestinian guerillas to impose a solution.

Nutting was a long-standing member of the board of Middle East International, the London based bimonthly journal on Middle East events.

He died at the Royal Brompton Hospital, London of heart failure on 23 February 1999, aged 79, and was cremated on 4 March at the West London Crematorium.

== Arms ==
Coat of arms of Anthony Nutting

Notes
Granted 31 August 1898 by Sir Arthur Edward Vicars, Ulster King of Arms.
Crest
A demi-gryphon segreant Or enclosed between two oak branches Proper.
Escutcheon
Chevronny of six Gules and Vert three gryphons segreant Or on a chief of the last as many oak branches slipped Proper.
Motto
Mors Potior Macula

Parliament of the United Kingdom
Preceded by Sir William Lindsay Everard	Member of Parliament for Melton; 1945–1956	Succeeded by Irene Mervyn Parnicott Pike
Political offices
Preceded by The Lord Henderson; Ernest Davies	Joint Parliamentary Under-Secretary of State for Foreign Affairs; 1951–1954 with The Marquess of Reading 1951–1953; Douglas Dodds-Parker 1953–1954	Succeeded by Robin Turton
Preceded by Selwyn Lloyd; The Marquess of Reading	Minister of State for Foreign Affairs; 1954–1956; With: The Marquess of Reading	Succeeded by The Marquess of Reading; Allan Noble
Baronetage of the United Kingdom
Preceded by Harold Stansmore Nutting	Baronet (of St Helens); 1972–1999	Succeeded by John Grenfell Nutting
