= Afghan Boundary Commission =

Joint effort to determine Afghan border

The Afghan Boundary Commission (or Joint Anglo-Russian Boundary Commission) was a joint effort by the United Kingdom and the Russian Empire to determine the northern border of Afghanistan. The Boundary Commission traveled and documented the northern border area during 1884, 1885, and 1886.

The commission was accompanied by Kazi Saad-ud-Din as the representative of the Amir of Afghanistan, but the Afghans did not have a real say in the matter. Tensions between Britain, Russia and Afghanistan grew in 1885, especially in the aftermath of the Panjdeh incident, in which several hundred Afghans were killed by a Russian army, witnessed by several members of the commission. From March until September, it seemed likely that this would lead to war between Russia and Britain, with the Commission at the epicentre (Britain controlled Afghanistan's foreign affairs following the Treaty of Gandamak). However, war was eventually averted.

Between 1885 and 1888, the Afghan Boundary Commission agreed the Russians would relinquish the most remote territory captured in their military advances but they would retain Panjdeh. The agreement delineated a permanent northern Afghan frontier at the Amu Darya, with the loss of a large amount of territory, especially around Panjdeh.

Some letters compiled by Charles Edward Yate "describe the sojourn of the British Commission around Herat during the summer of 1885; the subsequent meeting of the joint British and Russian Commissions in November of that year, and the progress of the demarcation of the frontier up to the time of their separation in September 1886; the return of the British Commission through Kabul to India in October 1886; the negotiations at St. Petersburg during the summer of 1887; the final settlement and demarcation of the frontier during the winter of 1887, and return through Russian Trans-Caspian territory in February 1888".

== Members of the Commission ==
- Peter Lumsden
- Joseph West Ridgeway
- Alexander Condie Stephen
- Edward Law Durand
- Charles Yate
- William Merk
- Thomas Holdich
- St George Corbet Gore
- Pelham James Maitland
- Milo Talbot
- William Hope Meiklejohn
- James Aitchison
- Carl Ludolf Griesbach
- William Simpson
- Havelock Charles

== Publications ==
- 18 plates of ornamental tiles from the Afghan Boundary Commission (1884)

== See also ==
- Panjdeh Incident
- British-Russian rivalry in Afghanistan
- European influence in Afghanistan
- Durand Line
