= Lord Edward Manners =

Captain Lord Edward Manners
- Lord Edward, 1895

Member of Parliament for Melton
- In office 1895–1900
- Preceded by: The Marquess of Granby
- Succeeded by: Lord Cecil Manners

Personal details
- Born: Edward William John Manners; 5 August 1864 Camden, London
- Died: 26 February 1903 (aged 38) Cannes, France
- Party: Conservative
- Parent(s): John Manners, 7th Duke of Rutland; Janetta Manners, Duchess of Rutland
- Education: Wellington College
- Alma mater: Royal Military College, Sandhurst

Captain Lord Edward William John Manners (5 August 1864 – 26 February 1903) was a British Army officer, Conservative politician, and aristocrat.

== Early life ==
Manners was born at 6 Cumberland Terrace, Camden, the eldest son of John Manners, 7th Duke of Rutland, by his second marriage to Janetta Hughan, daughter of Thomas Hughan. Henry Manners, 8th Duke of Rutland, was his half-brother and Lord Cecil Manners his brother.

He received his education at Wellington College and at the Royal Military College, Sandhurst.

== Career ==
After Sandhurst he was commissioned as a lieutenant into the 4th Battalion of the Rifle Brigade (Prince Consort's Own) on 7 February 1885. He retired from the Regular Army as a captain and joined the part-time 5th (Queen's Own Royal Tower Hamlets Militia) Battalion of the Rifle Brigade on 16 May 1894. On 12 May 1897 he transferred as a major to the 3rd (Leicestershire Militia) Battalion, Leicestershire Regiment, of which his father was the Honorary Colonel.

In 1895, he contested the Melton Division against Alderman Wakerley to succeed his half-brother as Member of Parliament for Melton, a seat he held until 1900, when he was forced to retire due to ill-health, and his brother Cecil replaced him.

"Lord Edward was by no means an eloquent speaker, but he was able to give expression to his views very clearly, and impressed his audiences with his genial and unaffected manner... Socially, Lord Edward was exceedingly popular, and during the time he occupied the position of Field Master of the Belvoir Hounds, he was held in great respect. He inherited much of the courtesy of his father, and a large share of the amiability of his mother."

== Personal life ==
He was a member of the Carlton Club (in St James's, London that was the original home of the Conservative Party) and the Turf Club.

After suffering from consumption (known today as tuberculosis) and failing health for considerable time, Manners died at Cannes in February 1903, aged only 38. He never married. After his body was brought from Cannes to London for cremation, his funeral was held in the Mausoleum at Belvoir Castle. The next day, a memorial service was held for him at St Margaret's, Westminster.

Parliament of the United Kingdom
Preceded by Marquess of Granby	Member of Parliament for Melton; 1895–1900	Succeeded by Lord Cecil Manners
