= Panjdeh incident =

1885 battle between Russia and Afghanistan

- Part of the Russian conquest of Central Asia and the Great Game
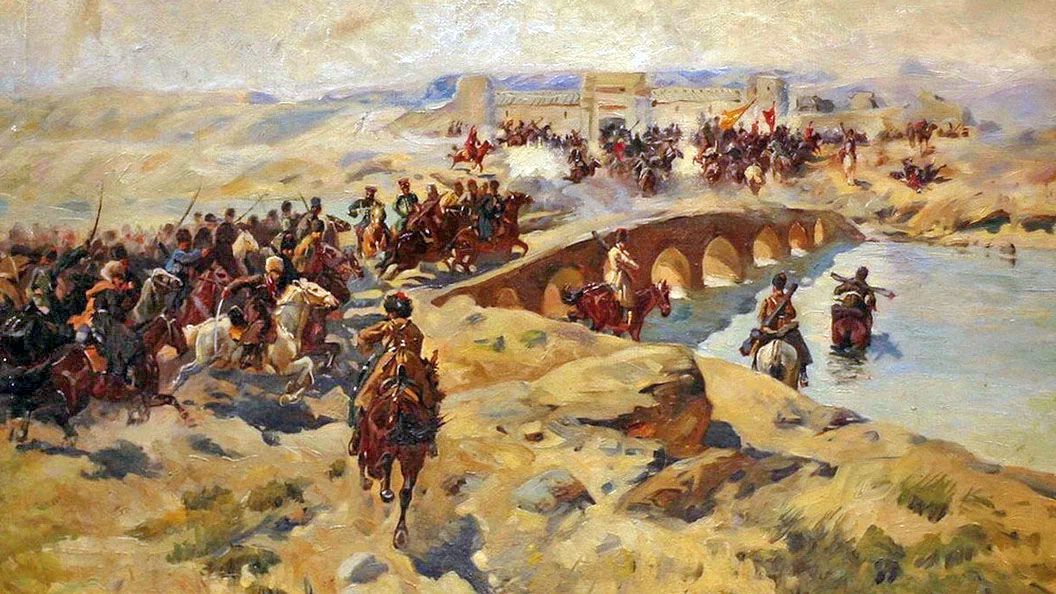
- Painting by Franz Roubaud depicting the battle
Date	February – 30 March 1885 (Note: The final agreement was signed only in July 1887)
Location	Kushka, Afghanistan (present-day Serhetabat, Turkmenistan) 35°17′N 62°21′E
Result	See § Results
Territorial changes	Afghan Boundary Commission delineates Afghan–Russian border from 1884–1888; Russia cedes Zu'l Faqar but retains Panjdeh

Belligerents
Russia	Afghanistan; United Kingdom

Commanders and leaders
(Russian Empire) Aleksandr Komarov	(Emirate of Afghanistan) Naib Salar Teimour Shah (WIA); (United Kingdom of Great Britain and Ireland) Charles Yate

Strength
Disputed; 1,660 or 2,500 or 4,000; 4 cannons	Disputed; 600 or 4,000 to 4,700 or 2,000; 8 cannons

Casualties and losses
27 to 42 killed and wounded (Note: 27 casualties; 9 killed, 18 wounded; 31; 9 killed, 22 wounded; 40 killed and wounded; 42 casualties; 9 killed, 35 wounded)	373 to 1,000 (Note: 373 casualties; 300 killed, 73 wounded; 500 killed and wounded, mainly killed; 600 killed; 500 killed, many more wounded, 24 prisoners; 1,000 killed)

Panjdeh Incident on a map of modern Turkmenistan
= Hari-Rud river =Murghab river
The Tejend and Merv oases are larger than the above dots

The Panjdeh incident (spelled Penjdeh in older accounts, and known in Russian historiography as the Battle of the Kushka) was an armed engagement between the Emirate of Afghanistan and the Russian Empire in 1885 that led to a diplomatic crisis between the United Kingdom and the Russian Empire regarding the Russian expansion south-eastwards towards the Emirate of Afghanistan and the British Raj (India). After nearly completing the Russian conquest of Central Asia (Russian Turkestan), the Russians captured an Afghan border fort, threatening British interests in the area. Seeing this as a threat to their rule in India, Britain prepared for war but both sides backed down and the matter was settled diplomatically, with the Russians and Afghans exchanging territories. The incident halted further Russian expansion in Asia, except for the Pamir Mountains, and resulted in the definition of the north-western border of Afghanistan.

== Background ==
After the Battle of Geok Tepe in January 1881 and the annexation of Merv in March 1884, Russia held most of what is now Turkmenistan. To the south of Merv, towards Herat in Afghanistan, the border was not clearly defined. The British were concerned because the Merv–Herat–Kandahar–Quetta line was a natural invasion route to India. The Russians had commenced construction of the Trans-Caspian Railway which would allow them to bring men and supplies to Merv and beyond.

Most of Turkmenistan is desert but irrigation supports a fairly dense population on the north slope of the Kopet Dag (Geok Tepe and Ashgabat). East of this are the oases of Tejend and Merv, the latter being one of the great cities of central Asia. Tejend was much smaller and to the south of Tejend and Merv is a grassy region sometimes called Badghis which is bounded by the Hari-Rud river on the west and the Murghab River to the east. The Hari-Rud flows north along the modern Iranian border, enters Turkmenistan and spreads out forming the Tejend oasis before drying up in the desert. The Murghab flows north through what is now Afghanistan and Turkmenistan, reaches Yoloten and spreads out, forming the Merv oasis. Where the Murghab crosses the current border, the irrigated area of Panjdeh (Five Villages) existed. Badghis was about 100 mi (160 km) wide and 75–150 mi (121–241 km) long from north to south, depending on where the boundaries are set. South of Badghis is the important Afghan city and border fort of Herat.

At the time of the Panjdeh incident, it was generally agreed that the northern frontier of Afghanistan began from the Persian border at Serakhs, running about 270 mi (430 km) east-north-east to meet the Oxus at Khoja Sale, an old name for the point where the Oxus now leaves Afghanistan. This border had never been properly defined.

== Build-up ==
In 1882, Britain and Russia began discussions about the Afghan boundary. In the summer of 1884, they agreed to form an Afghan Boundary Commission, the commissioners including Russian General Zelenoi and British General Sir Peter Lumsden. They were to meet at Serakhs in October but both were delayed. The Russians tried to push the border as far to the south as possible before it became fixed. General Komarov, governor of the Transcaspian Oblast, went south to Serakhs and expelled a Persian garrison on the east side of the Hari-Rud. The Russians then occupied Pul-i-Khatun 40 mi (64 km) south in Afghan territory. Later, they occupied the pass or canyon at Zulfikar and a place called Ak Robat about 50 mi (80 km) to the east. On the east side, the Sarik Turkomans of Yoloten submitted to the Russians in May 1884 but their kinsmen at Panjdeh refused, saying that they were subjects of the Amir of Kabul.

The Afghans sent troops to Bala Murghab and in June began building a fort at the north end of Panjdeh at the mouth of the Kushk River, which they called Ak-Tepe (White Hill; probably the old fort visible from space at 36.0371°N 62.7483°E). The Russians thought that the Afghans had done this with British connivance but the Afghans and the British claimed that the people of Panjdeh had always paid tribute to the Afghans or whoever controlled Herat. The Russians claimed that Panjdeh had never been garrisoned and that its people were part of a tribe that had submitted to Russia.

On 8 November, Lumsden arrived at Serakhs with 250 sepoys and 200 Bengal Lancers, having crossed little-known country in Baluchistan. Komarov avoided meeting him, claiming he was "occupied with other affairs." In mid-November, Komarov made a move up the Murghab toward Panjdeh and more Afghan troops were shifted up to counter this. The Russians built an advanced post at Sanduk Kuchan (Sandykgachy?) on the Murghab. The first commander of Merv District (uezd), Cossack Major Maksud Alikhanov went to parley with the Ak Tepe commander but was driven away with threats. The Afghans then sent a detachment to occupy Sary Yazy 10 mi (16 km) south of the Russian outpost.

== Conflict ==
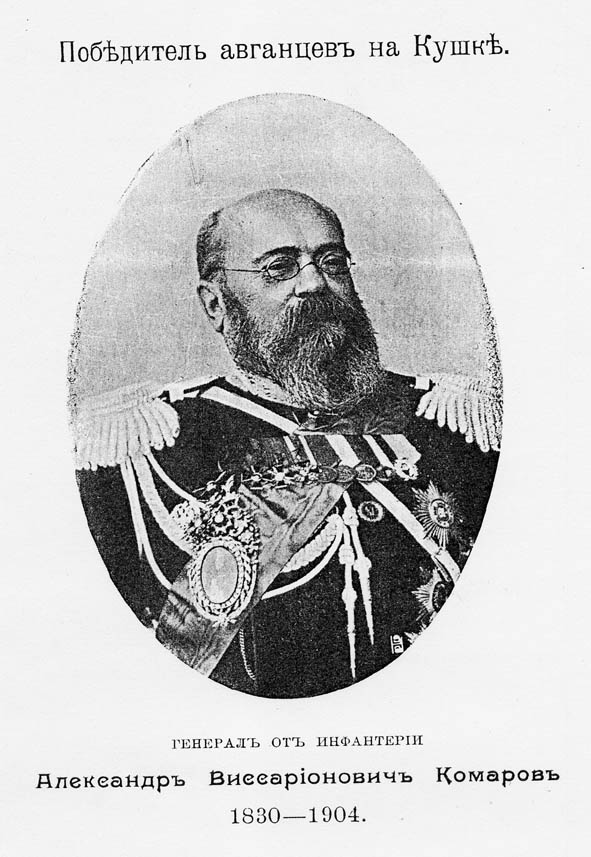
Portrait of Alexander Komarov with the caption "The winner of the Afghans"

For a few months there was a lull. Then in February 1885, the Russians occupied a post 3 mi (4.8 km) south of Sary Yazy. Lumsden advised the Afghans to withdraw further south. Russia next built a fort at Kazyl Tepe (Red Hill) about 2 mi (3.2 km) south of Ak Tepe and a mile south of Pul-i-Khishty (Brick Bridge) across the Kushk. On 25 March, Komarov arrived at Kazyl Tepe with 1,500 men. Two days later, they advanced, apparently trying to provoke the Afghans into firing first. Captain Charles Yate was the most senior British officer present, with only two other Europeans, and they futilely attempted to defuse the situation by talking to the Russian officers. The Afghans also occupied the territory on the left bank of the Kushka, several Russian requests from here were rejected.

On 30 (18) March 1885, Russians attacked the Afghans and defeated them, putting them to flight, the Russians got all the artillery, the convoy and they occupied Panjdeh. Komarov himself described his actions as a pre-emptive strike, It is noted that the Afghans pursued the Russian rearguard and constantly insulted it with shouts of "get out of here, there are no Merv and Turkmens, there are only Afghans here, we defeated the British and we will defeat you," which greatly offended Komarov and he got involved in the battle. That was what he reported to Saint Petersburg:

"The complete victory once again covered the troops of the Sovereign Emperor in Central Asia with great glory. The insolence of the Afghans forced me, in order to maintain the honor and dignity of Russia, to attack their heavily fortified positions on both banks of the Kushka River on March 18. The Afghan detachment of regular troops, with a force of 4 thousand people with 8 guns, was defeated and scattered, lost more than 500 people. killed, two banners, all the artillery, the convoy, supplies... The British officers directing the actions of the Afghans asked for our protection; unfortunately, my convoy did not catch up with them: they were probably carried away by the fleeing Afghan cavalry..."

The news reached England on 7 April and preparations for war began. On 27 April, William Gladstone asked the Commons for a credit of £11 million (£4.5 million for the Mahdist War in the Sudan (where Khartoum had fallen a few months earlier) and the rest for Russia). Alexander III of Russia suggested arbitration and negotiations which the British accepted. The crisis was partly averted by the initiative of Abdur Rahman Khan, the Amir of Afghanistan, who was then at Rawalpindi engaged in talks with the British. Having no desire to see two foreign armies fighting in his country, when told of Panjdeh, he pretended to regard it as a mere border skirmish.

In mid-summer, Lord Salisbury replaced Gladstone, which may have made British threats more credible. By 10 September, it was roughly agreed that Russia would keep Panjdeh, give up Zulfikar, and that the border would be approximately where it is now. The border commissioners started at Zulfikar on 10 November, reached the Murghab by Christmas, and went into winter quarters. In 1886, the line was run from the Murghab to the Oxus. Some minor problems had to be resolved by diplomats and the final protocol was signed on 22 July 1887. Persia somehow retained the Atak country north-west of Serakhs into which Russian patrols had penetrated.

== Results ==
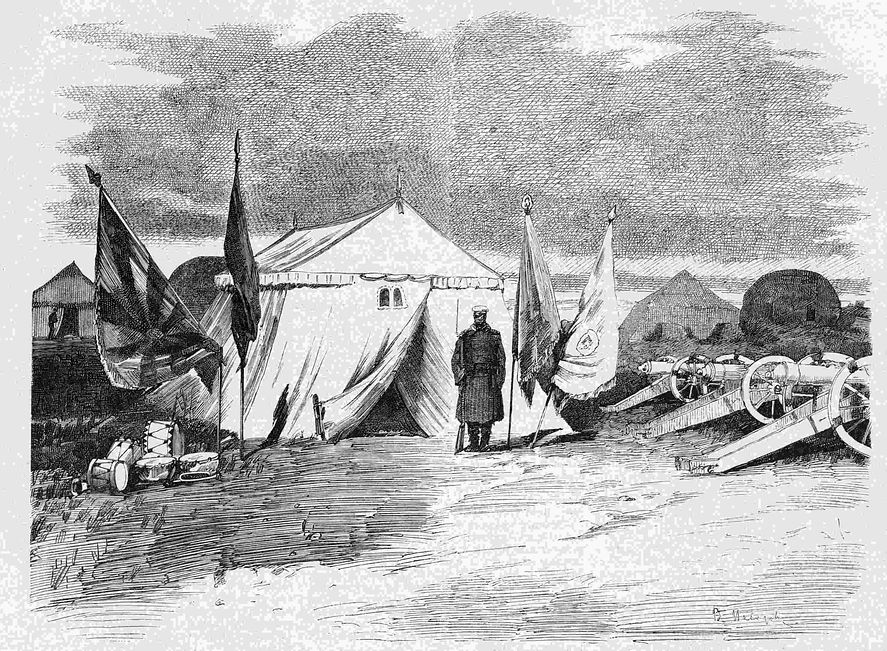
The Afghan camp captured on Kushka, sketch by Vasily Navozov

The conflict was finally settled only in 1887 and almost led to war, the Russian government was glad the result of the conflict, Russian sources defined it as a victory for Russia, including Mikhail Terent'yev. while some modern sources brings the result of the incident as a compromise despite the victory of the Russians in the field battle. After the battle, Komarov was awarded a gold weapon with diamonds for "Bravery" and received a personal thanks from Alexander III. Russian soldiers also composed a song dedicated to the battle with the title "let's remember the 18th of March".

== Aftermath ==
The battle became the reason for the beginning of the short-term Afghan crisis between Russia and the United Kingdom. The British recognized the conquest of Panjdeh by Komarov and the Russian government made concessions to Afghanistan. The absence of British aid to Afghanistan was seen as a violation of the Treaty of Gandamak. This led the Amir to believe that he could not rely on the British in the face of Russian aggression. Tensions between Russia and Britain eased when the Russian foreign minister Nikolay Girs and the ambassador to London Baron de Staal set up an agreement in 1887 that established a buffer zone in Central Asia. Russian diplomacy thereby won grudging British acceptance of its expansionism. In 1886, a new agreement was concluded with the new Afghan emir, according to which the cities of Chardjui and Kerki transmitted to Russia. In 1890, Russia founded Kushka (Serhetabat) at the south end of the new territory and, in 1901, connected Kushka by rail to Merv. Kushka remained the southernmost settlement in the Russian Empire and later the Soviet Union. The 1921 Afghan-Soviet Treaty of Friendship was one of the first international agreements made by Soviet Russia. Although "the Soviets agreed to return to Afghanistan, subject to plebiscites, territories in the Panjdeh area ceded under duress by Afghanistan to Russia or Bukhara in the nineteenth century," this was not done.

== See also ==
- Tagtabazar
- Venezuelan crisis of 1895
- Fashoda incident
- Urtatagai conflict (1913)
- Urtatagai conflict (1925–1926)
