= Sir Charles Yate, 1st Baronet =

Administrator in British India

Colonel Sir Charles Yate Bt CSI CMG JP
- Captain C. E. Yate, 1887

Member of Parliament for Melton
- In office December 1910 – 1924

Chief Commissioner of Baluchistan
- In office 1900–1904

Personal details
- Born: Charles Edward Yate; 28 August 1849 Holme-on-Spalding-Moor, East Riding of Yorkshire, England
- Died: 29 February 1940 (aged 90)
- Occupation: Soldier, Politician

Military service
- Allegiance: United Kingdom British Raj
- Branch/service: British Indian Army British Army
- Years of service: 1867-1906 1914-1918
- Rank: Colonel
- Battles/wars: Second Anglo-Afghan War Panjdeh incident First World War

Colonel Sir Charles Edward Yate, 1st Baronet, CSI, CMG, JP (28 August 1849 – 29 February 1940) was a British soldier and administrator in British India and later a politician in Britain.

== Early life ==
Yate was born at Holme-on-Spalding-Moor, Yorkshire, the son of the village's vicar. He was educated at Shrewsbury School and Rossall School and in 1867 purchased an Ensigncy in the 49th Foot.

== Military career ==
In 1871 he was promoted Lieutenant and transferred to the Bombay Staff Corps of the Indian Army and later to the Indian Political Service, serving as an assistant political superintendent in Rajputana.

He was promoted captain in 1879 and commanded a detachment of the 29th Bombay Infantry during the Second Afghan War, 1879–1880. He then served on General Roberts's staff and served as political officer in charge of Kandahar from August 1880 until May 1881. From 1884 to 1886 he served with the Afghan Boundary Commission, and later published a book about his experiences. In March 1885, he found himself at the epicentre of a global crisis when he was the most senior British officer to witness the Panjdeh incident which almost led to war between Britain and Russia. For his work with the Commission, he was appointed Companion of the Order of the Star of India (CSI) in 1887 and Companion of the Order of St Michael and St George (CMG) in 1888, being promoted Major between these two awards. He was also awarded the Afghan Order of Hurmat.

During this time, Yate was a supporter of the Pashtun colonisation of northern Afghanistan, writing in 1893 that "[i]t is only the non-Afghan tribes such as the Maimanah Uzbegs [Uzbeks], the Herati Hazarahs and Jamshidis, etc. that have any intercourse or communication with the Turkomans or Russians, and once encircled by Afghans they are safe."

In 1889 he was appointed British political agent in Muscat, in 1890 consul at Muscat, then political agent in Baluchistan, and in 1893 agent to the Governor-General to Khorasan and Sistan, based in Mashhad, Persia. He was promoted lieutenant-colonel in 1893 and consul-general in 1896. In 1898 he returned to Rajputana and in 1900 was appointed Chief Commissioner of Baluchistan. He was promoted colonel in 1901, and retired from the Indian Political Service in 1904 and the Indian Army in 1906.

During the First World War, he returned to service with the British Army, attached to No 1 Ambulance Flotilla, which transported casualties from the Western Front on the River Seine, in 1915.

== Political career ==
He returned to England in 1904. He stood unsuccessfully as a Conservative for Parliament at Pontefract in 1906, and for Melton, Leicestershire in January 1910 before being elected to the latter seat as Member of Parliament in December 1910. He served until 1924.

Yate was created a Baronet, of Madeley Hall in the County of Shropshire, for his political service in the 1921 New Year Honours.

== Later years ==
It was to Madeley he moved after retiring from Parliament, having previously lived at Asfordby House near Melton. He became Justice of the Peace for the Borough of Wenlock in 1927.

His only son died in childhood in 1910 (although he also had two daughters), and so the baronetcy became extinct upon his death, at Madeley Hall, aged ninety. Although he lost his speech in older age, he remained mentally alert enough to still take an interest in news from India. He was buried at St Michael's Parish Churchyard in Madeley.

== Footnotes ==
Political offices
Preceded by Hugh Shakespear Barnes	Chief Commissioner of Baluchistan; 20 November 1900 – 4 November 1904	Succeeded by John Ramsay
Baronetage of the United Kingdom
New creation	Baronet (of Madeley Hall); 1921–1940	Extinct
