= John Manners, 5th Duke of Rutland =

British landowner

His Grace The Duke of Rutland KG
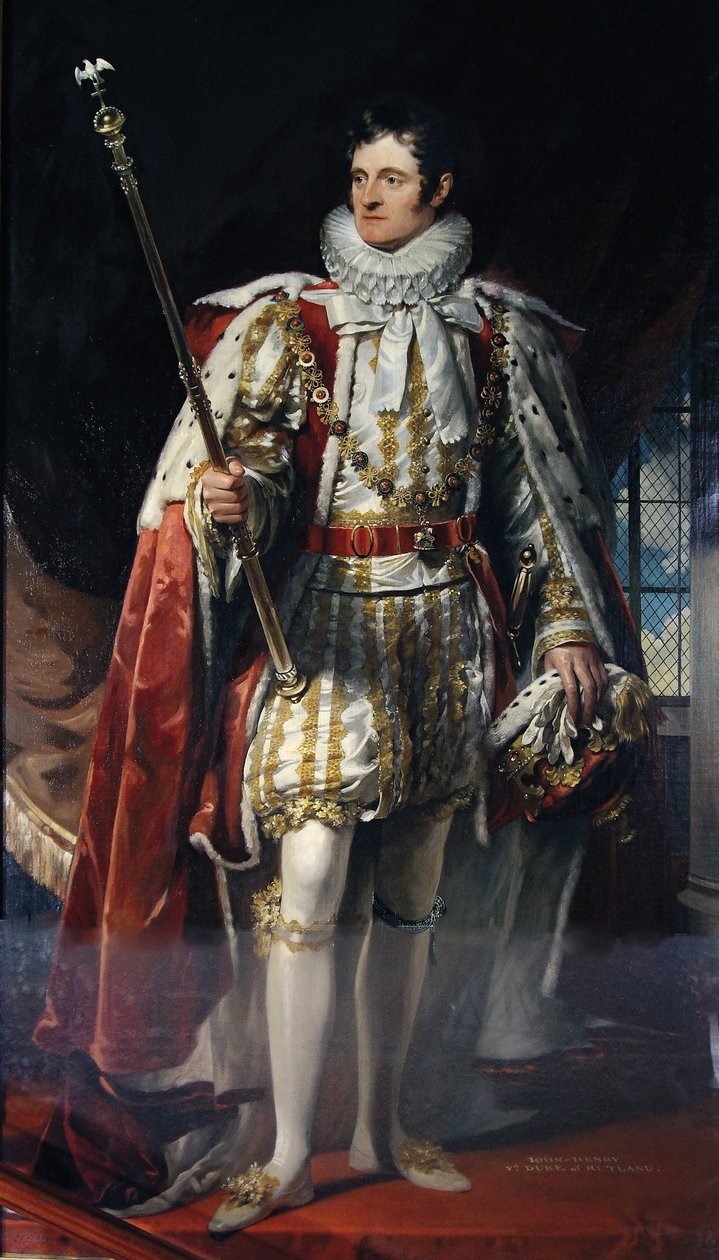
- A portrait of the Duke of Rutland.

Lord-Lieutenant of Leicestershire
- In office 1799–1857
- Preceded by: The Duke of Beaufort
- Succeeded by: The Duke of Rutland

Personal details
- Born: 4 January 1778 Knightsbridge, London, England
- Died: 20 January 1857 (aged 79) Belvoir Castle, Leicestershire, England
- Spouse: Lady Elizabeth Howard (m. 1799; died 1825)
- Children: 10, including Emmeline, Charles, John, and George
- Parent(s): Charles Manners, 4th Duke of Rutland; Lady Mary Isabella Somerset

John Henry Manners, 5th Duke of Rutland KG (4 January 1778 – 20 January 1857), styled Lord Roos from 1778 to 1779 and Marquess of Granby from 1779 to 1787, was a British aristocrat and landowner. He succeeded to his father's titles at age 9 and consequently held his dukedom for nearly 70 years.

== Background ==
Styled Lord Roos the first year of his life, Rutland was born at Knightsbridge, London, the eldest son of Charles Manners, 4th Duke of Rutland, by Lady Mary Isabella Somerset, daughter of Charles Somerset, 4th Duke of Beaufort. He was the grandson of John Manners, Marquess of Granby, and the brother of Lord Charles Manners and Lord Robert Manners. He was styled as the Marquess of Granby when his father succeeded to the dukedom in 1779. In 1787, he inherited the dukedom at only 9 years of age upon the unexpected death of his father at age 33.

He was educated at Trinity College, Cambridge, leaving with an M.A. degree in 1797.

== Public life ==
A peer from age 9, Rutland was unable to serve in the House of Commons, taking his seat in the House of Lords instead in 1799 after leaving Cambridge. He was strongly supportive of the Prime Minister William Pitt the Younger and subsequent Tory ministries. He held a conservative opinion on matters of church and state, and opposed the relaxation of the Test and Corporation Acts that restricted public office holders to members of the Church of England. He also opposed the Roman Catholic Relief Act 1813, which extended additional rights to Irish Roman Catholics. He was Lord Lieutenant of Leicestershire between 1799 and 1857.

At the age of 20 he was commissioned as Colonel of the Leicestershire Militia on 21 May 1798 and held the appointment until his death nearly 60 years later.

He was also a prominent owner and breeder of Thoroughbred racehorses. His most successful horse was Cadland, which won The Derby in 1828.

Rutland was fictionalized as "the duke" in Benjamin Disraeli's novel Coningsby. His two sons also figured as "the marquis of Beaumanoir" and "Lord Henry Sidney".

There is a bronze statue of him in Market Place, Leicester which was erected on this site in 1852 after having been previously exhibited at the Great Exhibition at Crystal Palace, London in 1851. It was the first public statue to be erected in Leicester, and was unveiled by Sir Frederick Gustavus Fowke, Provincial Grand Master of Freemasons for the Province of Leicestershire, on 28 April 1852. It was sculpted by Edward Davis. It is marked " EDW DAVIS Simonet & Fils / Fondeurs Paris 1851". It stands on a high stone plinth on which is carved an inscription as follows:

JOHN HENRY

DUKE OF RUTLAND, KG LORD LIEUTENANT OF LEICESTERSHIRE. THE INHABITANTS OF THE COUNTY & TOWN OF LEICESTER DURING THE FIFTIETH ANNIVERSARY OF HIS HIGH OFFICE WITH UNIVERSAL CONSENT CAUSED THIS STATUE TO BE ERECTED M.DCCC.Lii.

PRAESENTI TIBI MATUROS LARCIMUR HONORES.

== Marriage and issue ==
Rutland married Lady Elizabeth Howard, daughter of Frederick Howard, 5th Earl of Carlisle, on 22 April 1799.

They had ten children:

- Lady Caroline Isabella Manners (25 May 1800 – December 1804)
- Lady Elizabeth Frederica Manners (10 December 1801 – 20 March 1886), married Andrew Robert Drummond on 7 March 1821. They had seven children.
- Lady Emmeline Charlotte Elizabeth Manners (2 May 1806 – 29 October 1855), married Charles Stuart-Wortley-Mackenzie on 17 February 1831. They had three children.
- George John Henry Manners, Marquess of Granby (26 June 1807 – 4 August 1807)
- Lady Katherine Isabella Manners (4 February 1809 – 20 April 1848), married Frederick Hervey, 2nd Marquess of Bristol on 1 December 1830. They had seven children.
- Lady Adeliza Elizabeth Gertrude Manners (29 December 1810 – 26 October 1877), married her first cousin Rev. Canon Frederic John Norman on 22 February 1848, and had issue.
- George John Frederick Manners, Marquess of Granby (20 August 1813 – 15 June 1814)
- Charles Cecil John Manners, 6th Duke of Rutland (16 May 1815 – 3 March 1888)
- John James Robert Manners, 7th Duke of Rutland (3 December 1818 – 4 August 1906), married Catherine Marley on 10 June 1851. They had one son. He remarried Janetta Hughan on 15 May 1862. They had four children.
- Lord George John Manners (22 June 1820 – 8 September 1874), married Adeliza Fitzalan-Howard (daughter of Henry Fitzalan-Howard, 13th Duke of Norfolk) on 4 October 1855. They had five children.

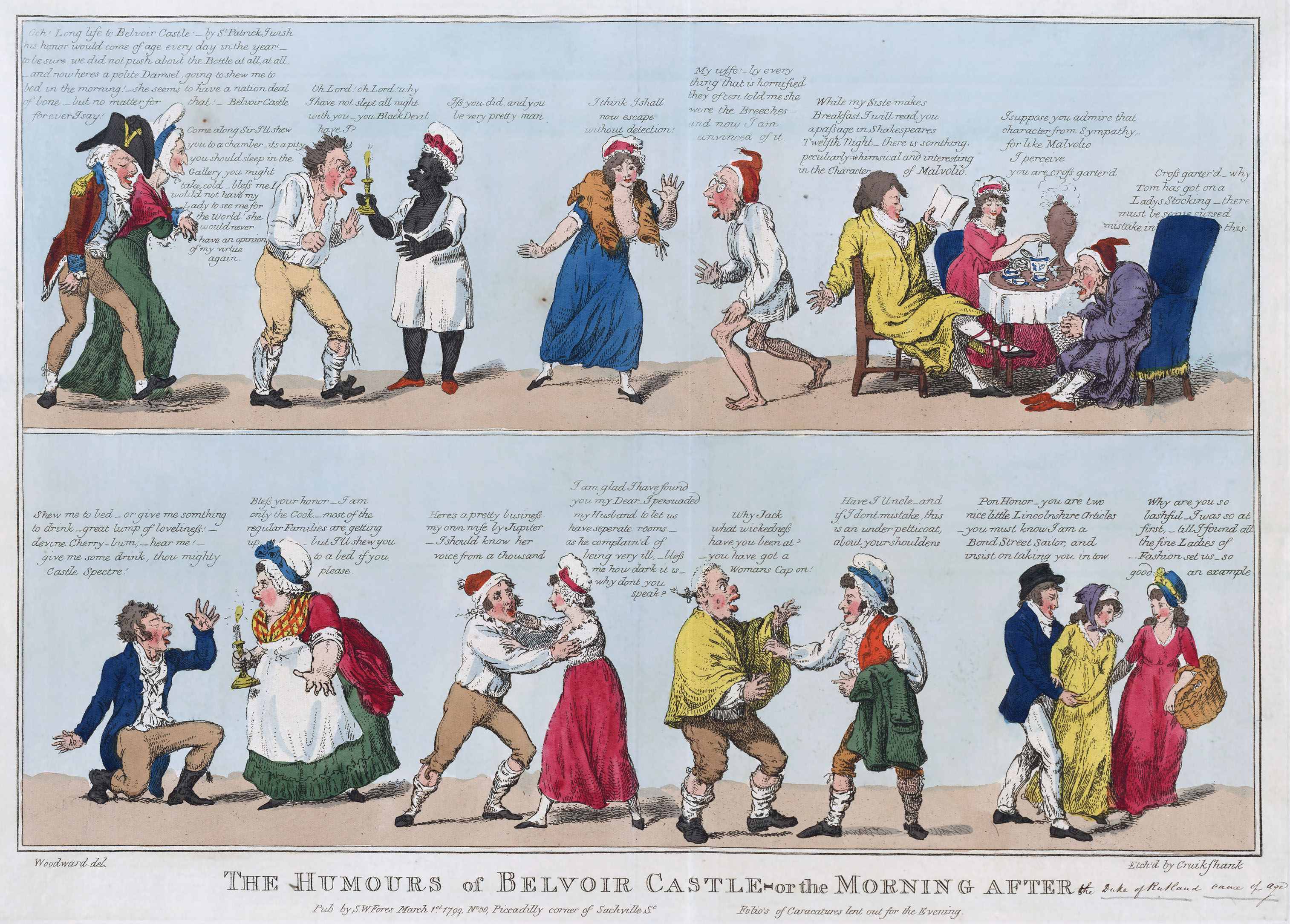
The Humours of Belvoir Castle -- or the Morning After, a 1799 caricature of his "coming of age" (21st birthday) celebration.

The Duchess oversaw landscaping works at Belvoir Castle grounds and took an active interest in managing the estate, including designing a model farm. She also made improvements to Cheveley Park and oversaw the building works at York House on the Mall for the Duke of York. She was also credited with designing a new palace for George IV.

The Duchess of Rutland died in November 1825, aged 45. Rutland remained a widower until his death from bronchitis at Belvoir Castle, Leicestershire, in January 1857, aged 79.

== Coat of arms ==
Coat of arms of John Manners, 5th Duke of Rutland
Coronet A Coronet of a Duke Crest On a Chapeau Gules turned up Ermine a Peacock in its pride proper Escutcheon Or two Bars Azure a Chief quarterly of the last and Gules, in the first and fourth, two Fleur-de-lis, and in the second and third, a Lion passant guardant, all Or Supporters On either side a Unicorn Argent armed, maned, tufted and unguled Or Motto Pour Y Parvenir ("So as to accomplish it") Orders The Garter circlet; motto: Honi soit qui mal y pense (Shame be to him who thinks evil of it).

Honorary titles
Preceded by The Duke of Beaufort	Lord Lieutenant of Leicestershire; 1799–1857	Succeeded by The Duke of Rutland
Peerage of England
Preceded by Charles Manners	Duke of Rutland; 1787–1857	Succeeded by Charles Manners
