= John Manners, 7th Duke of Rutland =

British politician and poet (1818–1906)

His Grace The Duke of Rutland KG GCB PC
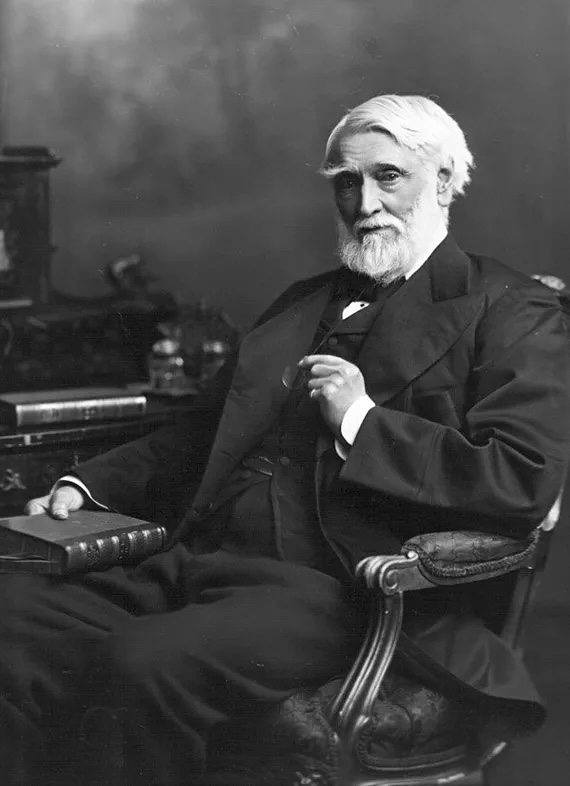
- The Duke of Rutland, c. 1900–06

Chancellor of the Duchy of Lancaster
- In office 16 August 1886 – 11 August 1892
- Monarch: Victoria
- Prime Minister: The Marquess of Salisbury
- Preceded by: The Viscount Cranbrook
- Succeeded by: James Bryce

Personal details
- Born: 13 December 1818 Belvoir Castle, Leicestershire
- Died: 4 August 1906 (aged 87) Belvoir Castle, Leicestershire
- Party: Conservative
- Spouses: Catherine Marley (m. 1851; died 1854) Janetta Hughan (m. 1862; died 1899)
- Children: 8, including Henry, Edward, and Cecil
- Parent(s): John Manners, 5th Duke of Rutland; Lady Elizabeth Howard
- Relatives: Charles Manners (brother); George Manners (brother); Emmeline Manners (sister)
- Education: Trinity College, Cambridge

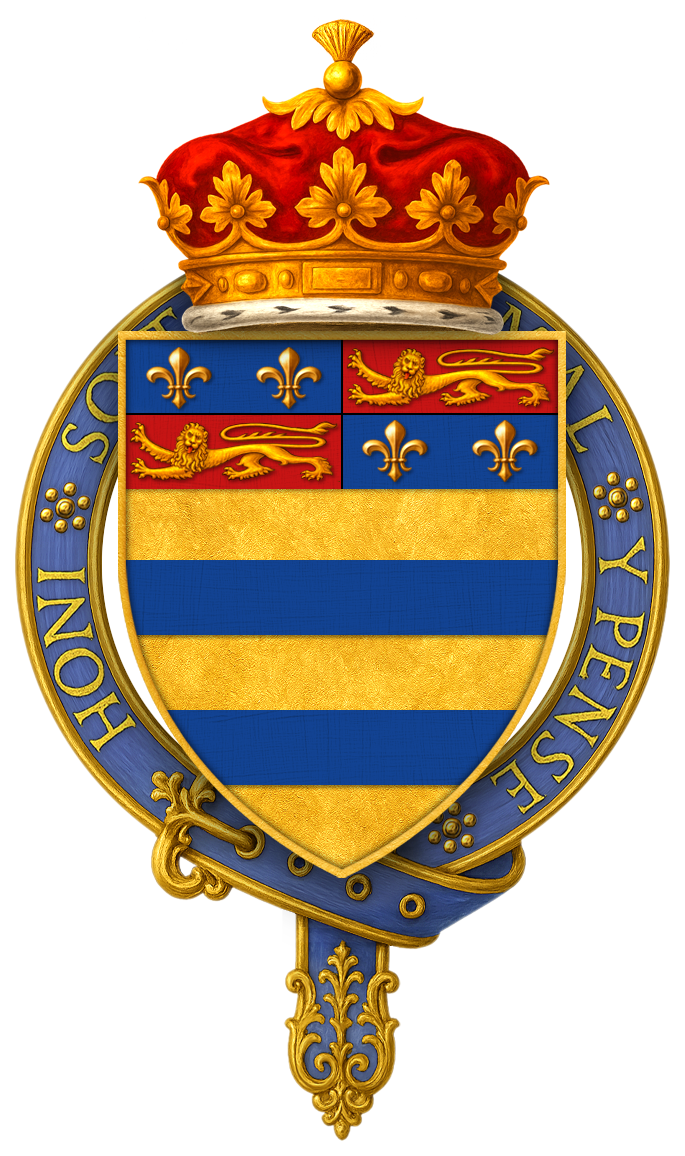
Garter-encircled arms of John Manners, 7th Duke of Rutland, KG, GCB, PC

John James Robert Manners, 7th Duke of Rutland, KG, GCB, PC (13 December 1818 – 4 August 1906), known as Lord John Manners before 1888, was a British aristocrat, landowner and politician.

== Youth and poetry ==
Rutland was born at Belvoir Castle, the younger son of John Manners, 5th Duke of Rutland, by Lady Elizabeth Howard, daughter of Frederick Howard, 5th Earl of Carlisle. Charles Manners, 6th Duke of Rutland, was his elder brother and Lord George Manners his younger brother. He was educated at Eton College, then entered Trinity College, Cambridge in 1836. At Cambridge, he was a member of the University Pitt Club. He graduated MA in 1839, and was later awarded the honorary degrees of LLD by the same university in 1862, and DCL by Oxford in 1876.

He wrote two books of poetry: England's Trust and Other Poems, published in 1841, and English Ballads and Other Poems, published in 1850. The 1841 book contains his famous quote: "Let wealth and commerce, laws and learning die, But leave us still our old Nobility!" The 1850 book contains his poem "A Legend of Haddon Hall."

== Political career ==
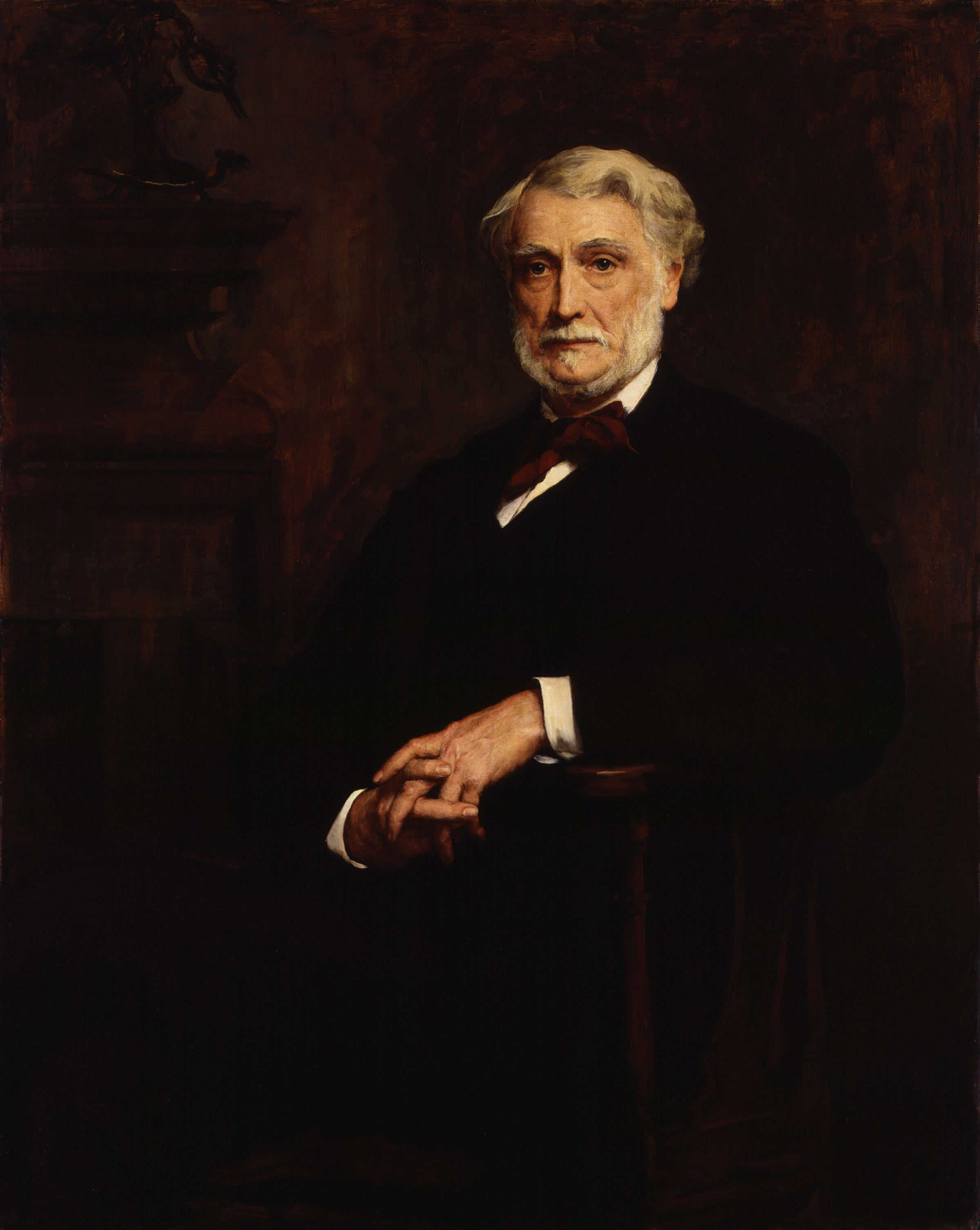
Painting by Walter William Ouless.

In 1841 Rutland was returned for Newark in the Tory interest, along with William Ewart Gladstone, and sat for that borough until 1847. Subsequently, he sat for Colchester, 1850–57; for North Leicestershire, 1857–85; and for Melton from 1885 until, in 1888, he took his seat in the House of Lords upon succeeding to the dukedom.

=== Young England ===
In the early 1840s, Manners was a leading figure in the Young England movement, led by Benjamin Disraeli. This party sought to reduce the predominance of the middle class bourgeoisie, and to re-create the political prestige of the aristocracy by proving its capacity to ameliorate the social, intellectual, and material condition of the peasantry and the labouring classes. At the same time its members looked for a regeneration of the church, and the rescue of both the church and Ireland from the troubles inherited from the Whig predominance of the 18th century. Manners made an extensive tour of inspection in the industrial parts of northern England, in the course of which he and his friend George Smythe, later 7th Viscount Strangford, gave well-received speeches. In 1843 he supported Lord Grey's motion for an inquiry into the condition of England, the serious disaffection of the working classes of the north being a subject to which he was constantly drawing the attention of parliament. Among other measures that he urged were the disestablishment of the Irish Church, the modification of the Statutes of Mortmain, and the resumption of regular diplomatic relations with the Vatican. In the same year he issued in pamphlet form a strong Plea for National Holydays.

In 1844 Lord John vigorously supported the Factories Act ("Ten-hours Bill"), which, though strongly opposed by Manchester representatives, was ultimately passed in May 1847. In October 1844 he took part in, and spoke at, the soirée held at the Manchester Athenaeum under the presidency of Disraeli. A few days later, he and his friends attended a festival at Bingley, in Yorkshire, to celebrate the allotment of land for gardens to working men, a step which, through the agency of his father, he had done a great deal to further.

However, divergences of opinion starting in 1845 eventually led to the disruption of the movement.

=== Cabinet ===
During the three short administrations of Lord Derby (1852, 1858–59, and 1866–68) he sat in the cabinet as First Commissioner of Works. In 1852 he was admitted to the Privy Council. On the return of the Conservatives to power in 1874, he became Postmaster-General under Disraeli, and was made GCB on his retirement in 1880. He was again Postmaster-General in Lord Salisbury's administration, 1885–86, and was head of the department when sixpenny telegrams were introduced. Finally, in the Conservative government of 1886–92 he was Chancellor of the Duchy of Lancaster. He was made a Knight of the Garter in 1891. In 1896 he was created Baron Roos of Belvoir, in the County of Leicester, when his son Henry Manners was summoned to the House of Lords by a writ of acceleration in his father's title of Baron Manners.

He was patron of Saint Martin's League for letter carriers.

He followed his elder brother as Honorary Colonel of the Leicestershire Militia, by then the 3rd Battalion of the Leicestershire Regiment.

== Sporting interests ==
He had a sympathetic interest in the Olympian Games movement of William Penny Brookes, first shown when he joined a party with his first cousin Lord Forester that viewed the first Wenlock Olympian Games at Much Wenlock in 1850. He there and then donated a cash prize of £1 (worth approximately £80 in 2017) to the committee, who awarded it to the winner of a running race. He was a member of the council of the fourth National Olympian Games that were held, again at Much Wenlock, in 1874. In 1883 he was president of Wenlock Olympian Games themselves that year.

== Family ==
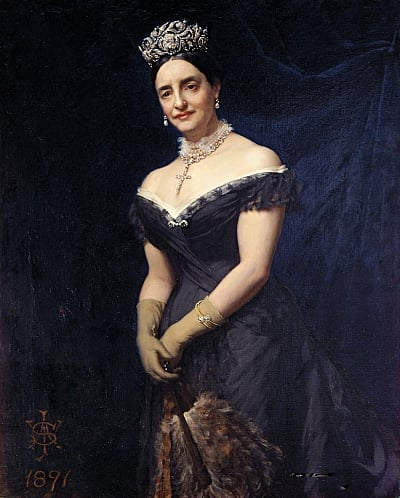
Portrait of his second wife, Janetta, Duchess of Rutland

Rutland married firstly Catherine Louisa Georgina, daughter of Colonel George Marlay and Catherine Louisa Tisdall, and granddaughter of George Marlay, Bishop of Dromore, in 1851. They had two children:

- Henry John Brinsley Manners, 8th Duke of Rutland (1852–1925)
- Edith Katharine Mary Manners (12 March 1854 – 24 March 1854), died in infancy

His wife died 7 April 1854, aged 23, from childbirth complications, weeks after giving birth to a daughter, Edith, who lived only 12 days. She was buried with her infant daughter in Highgate Cemetery.

Rutland married secondly Janetta Hughan, daughter of Thomas Hughan, in 1862. They had seven children, including:

- Lord Edward William John Manners (1864–1903)
- Lady Katherine Selina Janetta Manners (1866–1900)
- Lord Cecil Reginald John Manners (1868–1945)
- Lieutenant Colonel Lord Robert William Orlando Manners (1870–1917), an officer in the King's Royal Rifle Corps. This son was killed while commanding 10th Bn. Northumberland Fusiliers during the Great War. He was awarded the Order of St Michael and St George and the Distinguished Service Order. He is buried in The Huts Cemetery, six kilometres southwest of Ypres. He married in 1902 Mildred Mary Buckworth, daughter of Rev. Charles P. Buckworth and widow of a fellow KRRC-officer Major Henry Buchanan-Riddell.
- Lady Victoria Alexandrina Elizabeth Dorothy Manners (1876–1933)
- Lady Elizabeth Emily Manners (1878–1924), who in 1903 married Lord George Scott

His second family also had a Scottish property: St Mary's Tower in Dunkeld.

Rutland succeeded to the dukedom of Rutland in March 1888, upon the death of his elder brother. The Duchess of Rutland died in July 1899. Rutland survived her by seven years and died on 4 August 1906, aged 87, at Belvoir Castle.

== Coat of arms ==
Coat of arms of John Manners, 7th Duke of Rutland
Coronet A Coronet of a Duke Crest On a Chapeau Gules turned up Ermine a Peacock in its pride proper Escutcheon Or two Bars Azure a Chief quarterly of the last and Gules, in the first and fourth, two Fleur-de-lis, and in the second and third, a Lion passant guardant, all Or Supporters On either side a Unicorn Argent armed, maned, tufted and unguled Or Motto Pour Y Parvenir ("So as to accomplish it") Orders The Garter circlet; motto: Honi soit qui mal y pense (Shame be to him who thinks evil of it).

== Ancestry ==
Ancestors of John Manners, 7th Duke of Rutland

8. John Manners, Marquess of Granby
4. Charles Manners, 4th Duke of Rutland
9. Lady Frances Seymour
2. John Manners, 5th Duke of Rutland
10. Charles Somerset, 4th Duke of Beaufort
5. Lady Mary Somerset
11. Elizabeth Berkeley
1. John Manners, 7th Duke of Rutland
12. Henry Howard, 4th Earl of Carlisle
6. Frederick Howard, 5th Earl of Carlisle
13. The Hon. Isabella Byron
3. Lady Elizabeth Howard
14. Granville Leveson-Gower, 1st Marquess of Stafford
7. Lady Margaret Leveson-Gower
15. Lady Louisa Egerton

Parliament of the United Kingdom
Preceded by William Ewart Gladstone; Thomas Wilde	Member of Parliament for Newark; 1841–1847; With: William Ewart Gladstone 1841–1846; John Stuart 1846–1852	Succeeded by John Stuart; Hon. John Manners-Sutton
Preceded by Sir George Smyth; Joseph Hardcastle	Member of Parliament for Colchester; 1850–1857; With: Joseph Hardcastle 1850–1852; William Hawkins 1852–1857	Succeeded by William Hawkins; John Rebow
Preceded by Edward Farnham; Marquess of Granby	Member of Parliament for Leicestershire North; 1857–1885; With: Edward Farnham 1857–1859; Edward Hartopp 1859–1868; Samuel Clowes 1868–1880; Edwyn Burnaby 1880–1883; Hon. Montagu Curzon 1883–1885	constituency divided
New constituency	Member of Parliament for Melton; 1885–1888	Succeeded by Henry Manners
Political offices
Preceded by Lord Seymour	First Commissioner of Works; 1852	Succeeded by Sir William Molesworth
Preceded by Benjamin Hall	First Commissioner of Works; 1858–1859	Succeeded by Hon. Henry Fitzroy
Preceded by Hon. William Cowper	First Commissioner of Works; 1866–1868	Succeeded by Austen Henry Layard
Preceded by Lyon Playfair	Postmaster General; 1874–1880	Succeeded by Henry Fawcett
Preceded by George Shaw-Lefevre	Postmaster General; 1885–1886	Succeeded by The Lord Wolverton
Preceded by The Viscount Cranbrook	Chancellor of the Duchy of Lancaster; 1886–1892	Succeeded by James Bryce
Honorary titles
Preceded by William Ewart Gladstone	Senior Privy Counsellor; 1898–1906; With: Spencer Horatio Walpole (1898)	Succeeded by The Earl Spencer; The Earl of Ducie
Peerage of England
Preceded by Charles Manners	Duke of Rutland; 1888–1906	Succeeded by Henry Manners
Preceded by Charles Manners	Baron Manners (descended by acceleration); 1888–1896	Succeeded by Henry Manners
Peerage of the United Kingdom		Succeeded by Henry Manners
New creation	Baron Roos of Belvoir; 1896–1906	Succeeded by Henry Manners
