= General Manners =

General Manners may refer to:

- Lord Charles Manners (British Army officer, died 1761) (died 1761), British Army major general
- Lord Charles Manners (British Army officer, born 1780) (1780–1855), British Army general
- John Manners, Marquess of Granby (1721–1770), British Army lieutenant general
- Lord Robert Manners (British Army officer, born 1781) (1781–1835), British Army major general
- Lord Robert Manners (British Army officer, died 1782) (c. 1721–1782), British Army general
- Robert Manners (British Army officer, born 1758) (1758–1823), British Army general
- Russell Manners (British Army officer) (1736–1800), British Army general
