= Edward Basil Farnham =

British politician (1799–1879)

Member of Parliament for North Leicestershire
- In office 2 August 1837 – 9 May 1859 Serving with John Manners (1857–1859); Charles Manners (1852–1857); Lord Charles Manners (1837–1852)
- Preceded by: Lord Charles Manners; Charles March-Phillipps
- Succeeded by: John Manners; Edward Bourchier Hartopp

Personal details
- Born: 19 April 1799
- Died: 13 May 1879 (aged 80)
- Party: Conservative
- Spouse: Getrude Emily Cradock-Hartopp (m. 1851)

Edward Basil Farnham (19 April 1799 – 13 May 1879) was a British Conservative politician.

Farnham was the son of Edward Farnham and Harriet, daughter of Dr. Rhudde. He married Gertrude Emily Cradock-Hartopp, daughter of Sir William Edmund Cradock-Hartopp, 3rd Baronet and Jane Mary née Keane, in 1851. They had at least one child, William Edward John Basil Farnham. Farnham lived at Quarndon House in Leicestershire.

One of the first MPs to support Benjamin Disraeli for leader of the Conservatives, Farnham was first elected Conservative MP for North Leicestershire at the 1837 general election and held the seat until 1859 when he did not stand for re-election.

Outside of politics, Farnham was a Justice of the Peace and a Deputy Lieutenant for Leicestershire, as well as, in 1870, High Sheriff of Leicestershire. He was also a major in the Leicestershire Yeomanry Cavalry.

Parliament of the United Kingdom
| Preceded by Lord Charles Manners; Charles March-Phillipps | Member of Parliament for North Leicestershire; 1837–1859; With: John Manners (1857–1859); Charles Manners (1852–1857); Lord Charles Manners (1837–1852) | Succeeded by John Manners; Edward Bourchier Hartopp |
