= Leicestershire Militia =

Auxiliary unit of the British Army

Leicestershire Militia 3rd (Reserve) Bn, Leicestershire Regiment
- Active: 1558–April 1953
- Country: England (1558–1707); Kingdom of Great Britain (1707–1800); United Kingdom (1801–1953)
- Branch: Militia/Special Reserve
- Role: Infantry
- Size: 1 Battalion
- Part of: Leicestershire Regiment
- Garrison/HQ: Glen Parva Barracks
- Motto: Vestigia nulla retrorsum
- Engagements: Second Boer War

Commanders
- Notable commanders: John Manners, 5th Duke of Rutland

The Leicestershire Militia (Note: There is no consistency in the sources as to whether the regiment was the 'Leicester' or 'Leicestershire' Militia, though the former was more common before it became part of the Leicestershire Regiment.) was an auxiliary military force in Leicestershire in the East Midlands of England. From their formal organisation as Trained Bands in 1558 the Militia of Leicestershire served during times of international tension and all of Britain's major wars. They provided internal security and home defence but sometimes operated further afield, including Ireland and France, relieving regular troops from routine garrison duties, and acting as a source of trained officers and men for the Regular Army. The regiment later became a battalion of the Leicestershire Regiment, served in the Second Boer War, and trained thousands of reservists and recruits during World War I. It maintained a shadowy existence until final disbandment in 1953.

== Early History ==
The English militia was descended from the Anglo-Saxon Fyrd, the military force raised from the freemen of the shires under command of their Sheriff. It continued under the Norman kings, notably at the Battle of the Standard (1138). The force was reorganised under the Assizes of Arms of 1181 and 1252, and again by King Edward I's Statute of Winchester of 1285.

Under this statute 'Commissioners of Array' would levy the required number of men from each shire. The usual shire contingent was 1000 infantry commanded by a millenar, divided into companies of 100 commanded by centenars or constables, and subdivided into platoons of 20 led by vintenars. (John E. Morris, the historian of Edward's Welsh Wars writing in 1901, likened this process to calling out the Militia Battalion of the county regiment.) King Edward I made use of this mechanism in his Welsh and Scottish campaigns. As an inland county Leicestershire avoided most of these demands, but King Edward II called the first national levy in July 1322 for his failed Scottish campaign. Thereafter Leicestershire provided soldiers for all six national levies between 1322 and 1338 for service in Scotland or Flanders.

Threatened with invasion in 1539, King Henry VIII ordered a 'Great Muster' in every shire. The records for Leicestershire are fragmentary, but the town of Melton Mowbray mustered 61 archers and billmen, Groscote Hundred 552 men, and 'other places' in the county another 575.

== Leicestershire Trained Bands ==
The legal basis of the militia was updated by two Acts of 1557 covering musters and the maintenance of horses and armour. The county militia was now under the Lord Lieutenant, assisted by the Deputy Lieutenants and Justices of the Peace (JPs). The entry into force of these Acts in 1558 is seen as the starting date for the organised county militia in England. This mechanism was used to raise troops to suppress the Rising of the North in 1569. Although the militia obligation was universal, this assembly confirmed that it was impractical to train and equip every able-bodied man. After 1572 the practice was to select a proportion of men for the Trained Bands (TBs). They were trained by professional captains and muster-masters for up to 10 days each year. Musters were held about every three years when the arms and armour were inspected.

The threat of invasion during the Spanish War led to an increase in training. At first the government emphasised the 17 'maritime' counties most vulnerable to attack, and it was not until 1586 that inland counties were placed under lords-lieutenant, ordered to appoint captains and muster-masters and to intensify training. The TBs were placed on alert in April 1588 and brought to an hour's notice in June. When warning of the invasion Armada arrived the TBs were mobilised on 23 July. The Leicestershire TB foot (500 men) joined Lord Hunsdon's army at Tilbury defending the Queen and were formed with the Worcestershire, Warwickshire and Huntingdonshire TBs into Sir Henry Goodere's Regiment, 2100 strong. However, the army was broken up shortly after Queen Elizabeth gave her Tilbury speech on 9 August, the danger having passed.

In the 16th Century little distinction was made between the militia and the troops levied by the counties for overseas expeditions, and between 1585 and 1601 Leicestershire supplied 547 levies for service in Ireland and 150 for France. However, the counties usually conscripted the unemployed and criminals rather than the Trained Bandsmen – in 1585 the Privy Council had ordered the impressment of able-bodied unemployed men, and the Queen ordered 'none of her trayned-bands to be pressed'. Replacing the weapons issued to the levies from the militia armouries was a heavy burden on the counties.

With the passing of the threat of invasion, the trained bands declined in the early 17th Century. Later, King Charles I attempted to reform them into a national force or 'Perfect Militia' answering to the king rather than local control. In 1638 the Leicester TBs consisted of 290 musketeers and 210 corslets (body armour, signifying pikeman); in addition the TB Horse comprised 38 lancers and 62 light horse.

=== Civil Wars ===
In 1639 and 1640 Charles attempted to employ the TBs for the Bishops' Wars in Scotland. However, many of those sent on this unpopular service were untrained replacements and conscripts, and many officers were corrupt or inefficient. For the Second Bishops' War of 1640 Leicestershire was ordered to march 400 men to Newcastle upon Tyne. Together with the contingents from Worcestershire and Gloucestershire they formed a regiment roughly 1200 strong commanded by Viscount Grandison. Once again, it seems that many of the trained bandsmen nationwide escaped service and raw substitutes were sent in their place. More than two-thirds of Leicestershire's men were labourers, the county declining to take men away from agriculture before the harvest. As well as the trained bandsmen providing substitutes to serve for them, some of the Leicestershire conscripts succeeded in bribing their conducting officer to release them. The Scottish campaign ended in failure.

Control of the TBs was one of the major points of dispute between Charles I and Parliament that led to the First English Civil War. Captain Devereaux Wolseley led his company of the Leicester TBs to Nottingham to support the King when he raised his banner there in August 1642. However, once open warfare had broken out neither side made much use of the TBs beyond securing the county armouries for their own full-time troops who would serve anywhere in the country, many of whom were former trained bandsmen. Devereaux Wolseley commanded both a regiment of horse and a regiment of foot for the Royalists. Otherwise the TBs might be used as auxiliary units for garrisons. When the Royalists from Oxford attacked Leicester on 31 May 1645, 900 armed townsmen, probably including trained bandsmen, unsuccessfully defended the town, which was stormed and pillaged. Lord Grey of Groby raised men in Leicestershire in 1648 to oppose the Scottish invasion.

As Parliament tightened its grip on the country after the Second English Civil War, it passed new Militia Acts in 1648 and 1650 that replaced lords lieutenant with county commissioners appointed by Parliament or the Council of State. From now on, the term 'Trained Band' began to disappear in most counties. Under the Commonwealth and Protectorate, the militia received pay when called out, and operated alongside the New Model Army to control the country. During the campaign of 1651, the Leicestershire Militia was ordered to rendezvous at Northampton, and may have formed Lord Grey of Groby's regiment that fought at the Battle of Worcester.

== Restoration Militia ==
After the Restoration of the Monarchy the English Militia was re-established by the Militia Act 1661 under the control of the king's lords lieutenants, the men to be selected by ballot. This was popularly seen as the 'Constitutional Force' to counterbalance a 'Standing Army' tainted by association with the New Model Army that had supported Cromwell's military dictatorship, and almost the whole burden of home defence and internal security was entrusted to the militia. For example, the Leicestershire Militia were 'drawn out' in June 1666 to meet the threatened Dutch invasion.

There was a general muster of the militia in 1685 after the Duke of Monmouth landed at Lyme Regis on 11 June, launching the Monmouth Rebellion against King James II. The West Country militia were engaged, including at the Battle of Sedgemoor, but James deliberately belittled their performance to bolster plans for a large army under his own control. After the suppression of the rebellion he suspended militia musters and planned to use the counties' weapons and militia taxes to equip and pay his expanding Regular Army, which he felt he could rely upon, unlike the locally commanded militia. When William of Orange landed in the West Country in 1688 and marched against James, the militia did not stir against him in the 'Glorious Revolution'.

The militia continued their defence role under William. In 1697 the counties were required to submit detailed lists of their militia. Under the Earl of Rutland as Lord-Lieutenant, Leicestershire had three Troops of horse totalling 175 men under Col Lord Roos (eldest son of the Earl of Rutland), and a foot regiment of six companies, 609 men, commanded by Col Richard Lister. The militia continued mustering for annual training until the Treaty of Utrecht and the accession of King George I, but after the Jacobite Rising of 1715 they passed into virtual abeyance.

== 1757 Reforms ==
Under threat of French invasion during the Seven Years' War a series of Militia Acts from 1757 reorganised the county militia regiments, the men being conscripted by means of parish ballots (paid substitutes were permitted) to serve for three years. In peacetime they assembled for 28 days' annual training. There was a property qualification for officers, who were commissioned by the lord lieutenant. An adjutant and drill sergeants were to be provided to each regiment from the Regular Army, and arms and accoutrements would be supplied when the county had secured 60 per cent of its quota of recruits.

Leicestershire was assessed to raise 560 men in one regiment, and the issue of weapons to the regiment was ordered on 19 April 1760. It was embodied for permanent service at Leicester on 9 July following. The militia was disembodied in 1762 as the war was coming to an end, and continued with their annual training thereafter.

=== American War of Independence ===
The militia was embodied in March 1778 during the War of American Independence when the country was threatened with invasion by the Americans' allies, France and Spain. In addition to their balloted men, regiments were permitted to augment their strength by a company recruited from volunteers. It became common to assemble the militia in summer training camps alongside Regular forces. In the summer of 1781 the Leicestershire regiment, 520 strong, formed part of the 2nd Brigade of the Plymouth garrison, accommodated in camp at Roborough Down.

Hostilities ended with the Treaty of Paris and the militia could be stood down. From 1784 to 1792 they were kept up to strength by the ballot and were supposed to assemble for 28 days' training annually, even though to save money only two-thirds of the men were actually called out each year.

=== French Revolutionary War ===
The militia had already been embodied in December 1792 before Revolutionary France declared war on Britain on 1 February 1793. The French Revolutionary Wars saw a new phase for the English militia: they were embodied for a whole generation, and became regiments of full-time professional soldiers (though restricted to service in the British Isles), which the regular army increasingly saw as a prime source of recruits. They served in coast defences, manned garrisons, guarded prisoners of war, and carried out internal security duties, while their traditional local defence duties were taken over by the Volunteers and mounted Yeomanry.

On 8 August 1793 the Leicestershire Militia, with 8 companies was at Gorleston Camp on the Norfolk coast. In May 1797 the regiment formed part of a brigade in East Yorkshire.

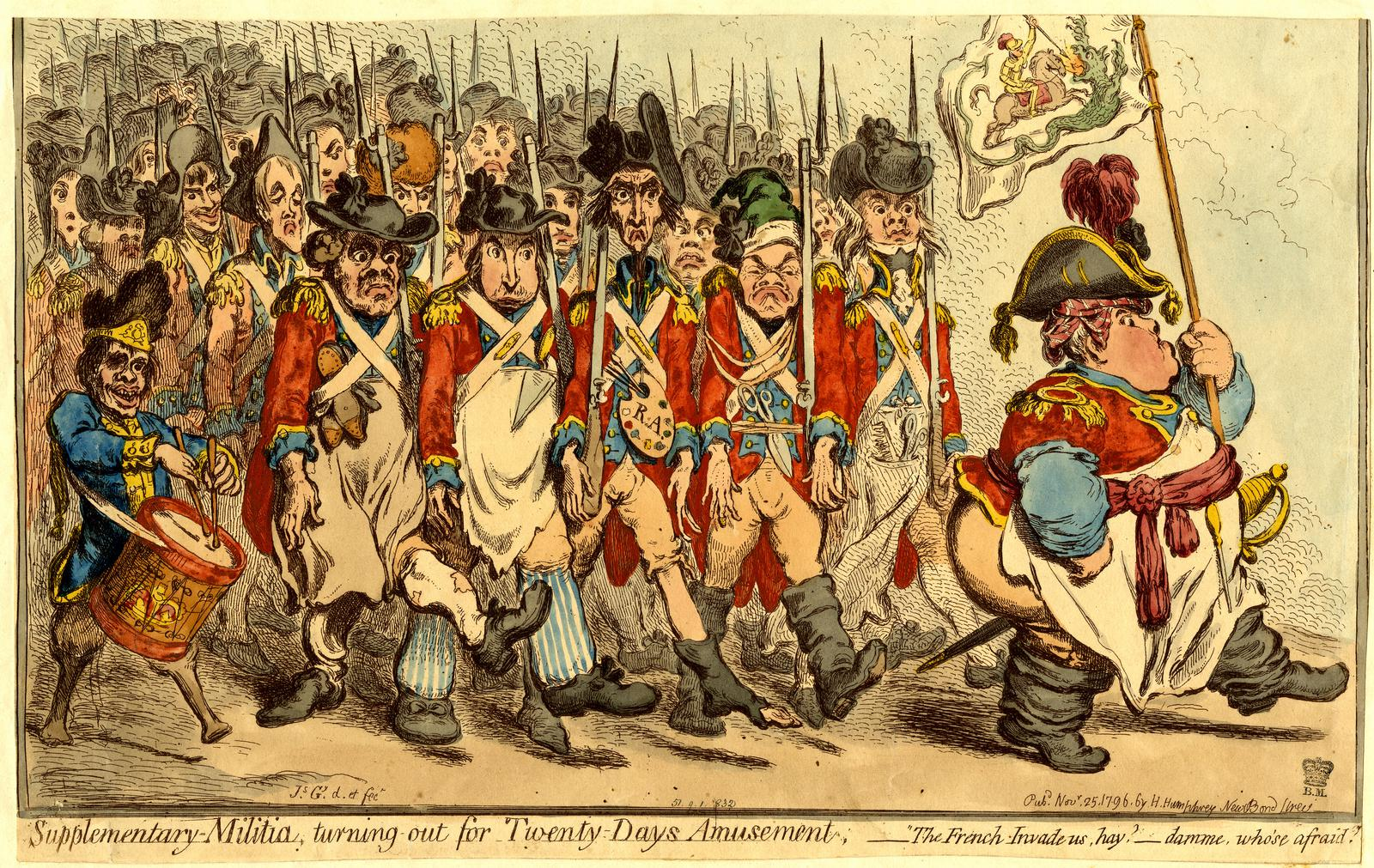
Supplementary-Militia, turning-out for Twenty Days Amusement: 1796 caricature by James Gillray.

In an attempt to have as many men as possible under arms for home defence in order to release regulars, the Government created the Supplementary Militia in 1796, a compulsory levy of men to be trained in their spare time, and to be incorporated in the Militia in emergency. Leicestershire's additional quota was fixed at 928 men. The lieutenancies were required to carry out 20 days' initial training as soon as possible, which was done by drill teams provided by the regular county militia. The supplementary militia were called out in two halves in February and August 1798 to augment the regular militia.

The 20-year-old John Manners, 5th Duke of Rutland, was commissioned as colonel of the regiment on 21 May 1798 and held the appointment until his death nearly 60 years later.

=== Irish Rebellion ===
In the summer of 1798 the Irish Rebellion became serious, and the French were sending help to the rebels. Legislation was passed to allow the English militia to serve in Ireland, and the Leicestershire was one of the regiments that volunteered. Afterwards, it was one four militia regiments granted the Irish harp as an emblem on their colours for their distinguished service in Ireland in 1798–9.

The Treaty of Amiens was signed in March 1802 and the militia were disembodied. The Supplementary Militia had been stood down in 1799, the discharged men being encouraged to enlist in the Regular Army. In 1802 Leicestershire's quota was reduced to 643.

=== Napoleonic Wars ===
The Peace of Amiens proving short-lived, the militia were re-embodied in March 1803 and resumed their normal duties. Increasingly, they were seen as a source of trained men for the Regulars and were encouraged to transfer, for a bounty, and the militia was replenished by use of the ballot and voluntary recruitment.

During the invasion crisis of 1805, while Napoleon assembled the 'Army of England' across the English Channel at Boulogne, the Leicestershire Militia, 697 strong under Lieutenant-Colonel Clement Winstanley, was based at Harwich Barracks (7 companies), with 3 companies forming the garrison of Landguard Fort.

=== Leicestershire Local Militia ===
While the Regular Militia were the mainstay of national defence during the Napoleonic Wars, they were supplemented from 1808 by the Local Militia, which were part-time and only to be used within their own districts. These were raised to counter the declining numbers of Volunteers, and if their ranks could not be filled voluntarily the militia ballot was employed. They were to be trained once a year.

By early 1809 there were three battalions in Leicestershire, each with an adjutant commissioned by the king, the other officers by the lord-lieutenant, mostly drawn from the disbanding volunteers:

- 1st Battalion, or Leicester Regiment of Local Militia – Lt-Col Commandant John Mansfield, formerly Lt-Col Comm of the Loyal Leicester Volunteers
- 2nd Battalion, or West Leicestershire Regiment of Local Militia – Lt-Col Comm Dudley Baxter, formerly Major Comm of the Hinckley Volunteers and Major in the West Leicester Loyal Volunteers
- 3rd Battalion, or Loughborough Regiment of Local Militia – Lt-Col Comm James Booth, formerly Captain-Comm of the Loughborough Volunteers

=== Ireland and France ===
The Interchange Act 1811 passed in July allowed English militia regiments to serve in Ireland and vice versa for up to two years. The Leicestershire were one of the regiments that volunteered and was selected. It appears that the government was happy to send the Leicesters (and other Midlands militia regiments) to Ireland in case they developed sympathies with the Luddites, who began their machine-breaking in Nottingham in 1811.

From November 1813 the militia were invited to volunteer for limited overseas service, primarily for garrison duties in Europe. Fourteen officers and 420 other ranks (ORs) of the Leicesters volunteered for this service, forming part of the 2nd Provisional Battalion. The battalion assembled at Chelmsford and marched to Portsmouth where the Militia Brigade was assembling, arriving on 5 March. The brigade embarked on 10–11 March 1814 and joined the Earl of Dalhousie's division that had occupied Bordeaux just as the war was ending. The brigade did not form part of the Army of Occupation after the abdication of Napoleon and returned to England in June.

A number of regiments remained embodied, or were briefly re-embodied, during and after the brief Waterloo campaign in 1815, but all were disembodied during 1816. The Local Militia was also stood down in 1816 and its ballot was suspended.

=== Long Peace ===
After Waterloo there was another long peace. Although ballots were still held, the regular militia regiments were rarely assembled for training and their permanent staffs of sergeants and drummers (who were occasionally used to maintain public order) were progressively reduced. Officers continued to be commissioned sporadically. The Duke of Rutland remained colonel of the disembodied Leicestershire regiment, as well as being Lord-Lieutenant, and in 1839 he appointed John King of Stretton Hall as lieutenant-colonel, and his own son the Marquess of Granby as major.

== 1852 Reforms ==
The Militia of the United Kingdom was revived by the Militia Act 1852, enacted during a renewed period of international tension. As before, units were raised and administered on a county basis, and filled by voluntary enlistment (although conscription by means of the Militia Ballot might be used if the counties failed to meet their quotas). Training was for 56 days on enlistment, then for 21–28 days per year, during which the men received full army pay. The Militia was transferred from the Home Office to the War Office (WO). Under the Act, militia units could be embodied by Royal Proclamation for full-time home defence service in three circumstances:

1. 'Whenever a state of war exists between Her Majesty and any foreign power'.
2. 'In all cases of invasion or upon imminent danger thereof'.
3. 'In all cases of rebellion or insurrection'.

New younger officers, many of them ex-Regulars, were appointed to the revived regiments. As part of the 1852 reforms, the position of Colonel of the Regiment in the militia was abolished and the lieutenant-colonel became commanding officer (CO). After the death of the 5th Duke of Rutland, the Marquess of Granby succeeded his father as 6th Duke and was appointed the first Honorary Colonel of the regiment; Lt-Col King remained as CO.

=== Crimean War and Indian Mutiny ===
The Crimean War having broken out and a large expeditionary force sent overseas, the militia were called out for home defence. The Leicestershire regiment was embodied on 14 December 1854. It remained at Leicester until January 1856, when it moved to Aldershot Camp. Following the signature of the Treaty of Paris the regiment was disembodied on 12 June 1856.

The Leicestershires were called out again for garrison duty when much of the army was sent to quell the Indian Mutiny. The regiment was embodied on 3 November 1857 and by February 1858 it was stationed at Cork in Ireland. On 13 February a detachment of 14 officers and 324 ORs of the regiment marched from Cork to Limerick to aid the civil power. (Note: Hay says that this happened in 1856, but the 'Stations of the Embodied Militia' in the Gazette do not support this date.) It was disembodied on 18 May 1858.

Over the following years the regiment was mustered each year for 21 or 28 days' training. Militia battalions now had a large cadre of permanent staff (about 30) and a number of the officers were former Regulars. Around a third of the recruits and many young officers went on to join the Regular Army. The Militia Reserve introduced in 1867 consisted of present and former militiamen who undertook to serve overseas in case of war.

Lieutenant-Col King died in 1869 after 30 years' service in the rank, and the Duke of Rutland promoted Maj Sir Frederick Fowke, 2nd Baronet, to take over as CO on 1 September 1869.

== Cardwell and Childers reforms ==
Under the 'Localisation of the Forces' scheme introduced by the Cardwell Reforms of 1872, militia regiments were brigaded with their local Regular and Volunteer battalions. For the Leicestershire Militia this was in Sub-District No 27 (Counties of Nottingham & Leicester):

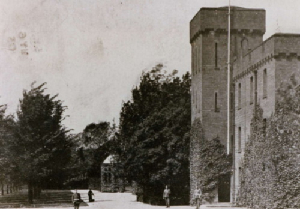
Glen Parva Barracks, depot of the Leicestershire Regiment from 1881.

- 1st and 2nd Bns 17th (Leicestershire) Regiment of Foot
- 45th (Nottinghamshire) (Sherwood Foresters) Regiment of Foot
- Leicestershire Militia at Leicester
- 2nd Leicestershire Militia (to be formed)
- Royal Sherwood Foresters Militia at Newark-on-Trent
- 1st Administrative Battalion, Leicestershire Rifle Volunteer Corps at Leicester
- 1st Administrative Battalion, Nottinghamshire Rifle Volunteer Corps at East Retford
- 1st Nottinghamshire (Robin Hood) Rifle Volunteer Corps at Nottingham

The brigade depot was to be established at Leicester, and a barracks was later built at Glen Parva near South Wigston, just outside Leicester.

Following the Cardwell Reforms a mobilisation scheme began to appear in the Army List from December 1875. This assigned Regular and Militia units to places in an order of battle of corps, divisions and brigades for the 'Active Army', even though these formations were entirely theoretical, with no staff or services assigned. The Leicestershire Militia were assigned to 2nd Brigade of 2nd Division, VII Corps. The brigade would have mustered at Northampton in time of war.

=== 3rd and 4th Battalions, Leicestershire Regiment ===
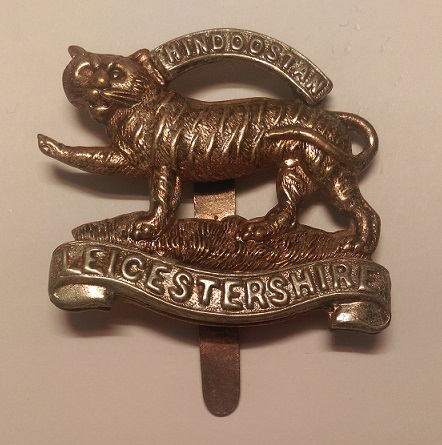
The Leicestershire Regiments' Royal tiger cap badge that gave rise to the regimental nickname.

The Childers Reforms of 1881 completed the Cardwell process by converting the Regular regiments into two-battalion county regiments, each with two militia battalions. However, the 17th Foot already had two battalions and remained at Leicester with its militia and volunteer battalions as the Leicestershire Regiment; the 45th Foot and Nottinghamshire units were instead amalgamated with the 95th (Derbyshire) Regiment of Foot and its associated units to form the Sherwood Foresters (Derbyshire Regiment). From 1 July 1881 the Leicestershire Regiment was organised as:

- 1st and 2nd Battalions
- 3rd (Leicestershire Militia) Battalion
- 4th (Leicestershire Militia) Battalion (Note: The 4th (Leicestershire Militia) Battalion should not be confused with the 4th Battalion formed in the Territorial Force in 1908.)
- 1st Volunteer Battalion

However, the Army List always showed the Leicestershire militia as combined '3rd and 4th Battalions' and no officers were ever separately listed for the 4th Bn. It was formally amalgamated back into the 3rd Bn on 1 April 1889.

=== Second Boer War ===
When the bulk of the Regular Army was sent to South Africa at the outbreak of the Second Boer War, the Militia Reserve was called out as reinforcements, followed by the militia battalions for home defence. 3rd Leicesters were embodied from 20 February to 5 December 1900. However, the guerrilla war dragged on, and the battalion was re-embodied on 24 February 1902. It volunteered for active service in South Africa and embarked on 26 March with a strength of 25 officers and 580 ORs under the command of Col Lord Braye.

On arrival at Cape Town on 13 April the battalion was split into detachments: F and G Companies left on 14 April, and battalion HQ and the other six companies followed soon afterwards. Lord Braye had to be left in hospital at Cape Town, and he was later invalided home without seeing any service; the battalion was commanded by Maj and Hon Lt-Col Benjamin Humfrey. On arrival at Burgersdorp, B and D Companies were sent on to Aliwal North and Lemoenfontein, while the train with HQ, A, C, E and H dropped a detachment at each blockhouse along the line from Burgersdorp to Bethulie Bridge. Battalion HQ at Knapdaar occupied two small sandbag redoubts and a loopholed iron hut surrounded by stone walls and sandbags, together with two blockhouses on nearby 'Observation Hill'. In May Lieutenant-General Sir John French gathered a force to round up commandos under Commandants Malan and Fouche. On 15 May the 3rd Leicesters was ordered to deplete the blockhouse line, leaving just two men in each, and to concentrate all its strength at Rosmead, where it was rejoined by F Company. On 19 May the battalion arrived at Graaff-Reinet to join a mobile column, but the Boers had dispersed during the night. The battalion was moved to Steynsberg to complete and occupy an extension of the blockhouse line, with firing being heard nightly. On 5 June the battalion returned to Knapdaar, then on 20 June it marched cross-country to Aliwal North, where it captured a few straggling Boers. The snow was deep at Knapdaar and the Stormberg Spruit was swollen, causing great difficulty for the ox-drawn battalion transport. The war had ended by now, and 3rd Leicesters camped at Aliwal from 23 June, where the Lemoenfontein detachment rejoined on 14 July, and others came in on 7 August. On 2 September the battalion went by train to East London, picking up G Company on the way, and embarked for home on 8 September. It was disembodied on 4 October 1902.

During its service the battalion had lost 10 men killed or died of disease. The participants received the Queen's South Africa Medal with the clasps 'South Africa 1902' and 'Cape Colony'; a small number also received the 'Orange River' clasp. The battalion was awarded the Battle honour South Africa 1902, which it bore on its Regimental colour until 1910 when Special Reserve battalions adopted the battle honours of their parent regiment (the Leicestershire Regiment already carried South Africa 1899–1902).

== Special Reserve ==
After the Boer War, the future of the militia was called into question. There were moves to reform the Auxiliary Forces (Militia, Yeomanry and Volunteers) to take their place in the six Army Corps proposed by the Secretary of State for War, St John Brodrick. However, little of Brodrick's scheme was carried out. Under the more sweeping Haldane Reforms of 1908, the Militia was replaced by the Special Reserve (SR), a semi-professional force whose role was to provide reinforcement drafts for regular units serving overseas in wartime, rather like the earlier Militia Reserve. The 3rd (Leicestershire Militia) Bn transferred to the SR on 21 June as the 3rd (Reserve) Battalion, Leicestershire Regiment.

=== 3rd (Reserve) Battalion ===
On the outbreak of World War I on 4 August 1914 3rd (Reserve) Bn mobilised at Glen Parva Barracks under Lt-Col Charles Palmer, who had been CO since 28 February and commanded the battalion throughout the war. It immediately went to its war station at Portsmouth, where it carried out its twin roles of coast defence and training drafts of reservists and new recruits for the Regular battalions serving overseas (1st Bn on the Western Front), 2nd Bn in Mesopotamia and Palestine). It also formed the 10th Bn(see below) from surplus personnel. By May 1915 the battalion was at Hull and remained in the Humber garrison to the end of war. The remaining personnel were drafted to the 2nd Bn on 1 August 1919 and 3rd Bn was formally disembodied on 7 September 1919.

=== 10th (Reserve) Battalion ===
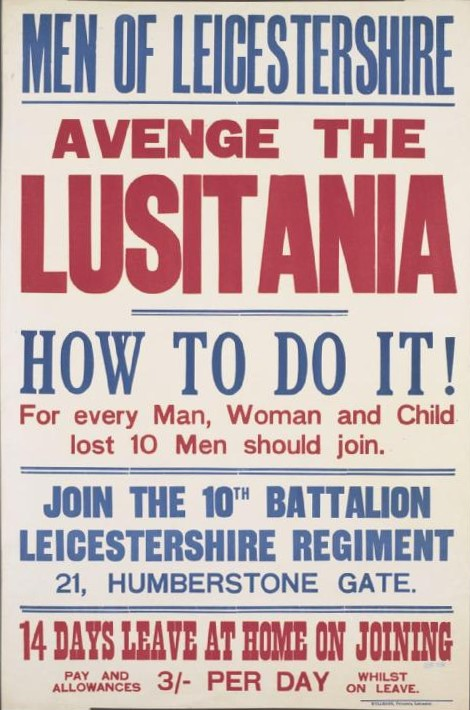
1915 recruiting poster for the 10th (Reserve) Battalion.

After Lord Kitchener issued his call for volunteers in August 1914, the battalions of the 1st, 2nd and 3rd New Armies ('K1', 'K2' and 'K3' of 'Kitchener's Army') were quickly formed at the regimental depots. The SR battalions also swelled with new recruits and were soon well above their establishment strength. On 8 October 1914 each SR battalion was ordered to use the surplus to form a service battalion of the 4th New Army ('K4'). Accordingly, the 3rd (Reserve) Bn at Portsmouth formed the 10th (Service) Bn, Leicestershire Regiment on 31 October, which became part of 96th Brigade in 32nd Division and began training for active service. Colonel James Cowley became its CO on 5 November. In the spring of 1915 the WO decided to convert the K4 battalions into 2nd Reserve units, providing drafts for the K1–K3 battalions in the same way that the SR was doing for the Regular battalions. On 10 April 1915 the 10th Leicester became 10th (Reserve) Battalion, and 96th Brigade became 8th Reserve Brigade at Wareham. 10th (R) Battalion trained drafts for the 6th, 7th, 8th and 9th (Service) Bns of the regiment serving as the 110th 'Tiger' Brigade on the Western Front]. In June 1915 it moved to Barnard Castle in County Durham, and in November it joined 1st Reserve Brigade at Rugeley in the Cannock Chase training area. On 1 September 1916 the 2nd Reserve battalions were transferred to the Training Reserve (TR) and the 10th Leicesters was redesignated as 5th Training Reserve Bn. The training staff retained their Leicester badges.

On 24 October 1917 the battalion became 53rd (Young Soldier) Bn, Northumberland Fusiliers still at Rugeley in 1st Reserve Bde. About October 1918 it moved to Clipstone Camp in Nottinghamshire. After the Armistice with Germany the training battalions were converted to service battalions to replace the units being demobilised. 53rd (YS) Battalion became 53rd (Service) Bn on 8 February 1919 and joined the British Army of the Rhine. It served with 1st Northern Brigade until it was disbanded on the Rhine on 26 October 1919.

=== Postwar ===
The SR resumed its old title of Militia in 1921 but like most militia units the 3rd Leicesters remained in abeyance after World War I. By the outbreak of World War II in 1939, no officers remained listed for the 3rd Bn. The Militia was formally disbanded in April 1953.

== Heritage and ceremonial ==
=== Uniforms and insignia ===
At Plymouth in 1781 the regiment was recorded as wearing red coats with yellow facings. These were retained until 1881 when the regiment adopted the white facings of the 17th Foot as part of the Leicestershire Regiment.

As described above, the regiment was permitted to carry the Irish harp on its colours after 1798.

In the Napoleonic period the officers' pouches had the letters 'LM' beneath a crown in the centre of a circle inscribed with the motto Vestigia nulla retrorsum ('Never a backward step'), the whole on an eight-pointed star. The officers' silver shoulder-belt plate of about 1840–1855 bore an eight-pointed star in the centre of which was a green enamel Saint George's Cross within a gilt crowned garter; below the garter was a scroll inscribed 'Leicestershire'. The officer's buttons had the Royal cypher within a crowned garter inscribed with the regimental title.

From 1874 the badge on the men's Glengarry cap was the Irish harp within a crowned garter inscribed with the regimental motto. The officers' helmet plate from 1878 had the harp inside a circle inscribed 'Leicestershire Militia' with a scroll below carrying the motto; the whole was within a laurel-wreath on an eight-pointed star surmounted by a crown.

In 1881 the battalion adopted the Royal Tiger badge of the Leicestershire Regiment, but the crowned Irish harp now appeared beneath the tiger on the cap badges and waistbelt plates of the officers of all battalions of the regiment.

=== Precedence ===
In 1759 it had been ordered that militia regiments on service were to take precedence from the date of their arrival in camp. When the Leicesters were raised in 1760 this was altered to a system of drawing lots where regiments did duty together. During the War of American Independence the counties were given an order of precedence determined by ballot each year. For Leicestershire the positions were:

- 15th on 1 June 1778
- 10th on 12 May 1779
- 31st on 6 May 1780
- 8th on 28 April 1781
- 31st on 7 May 1782

The militia order of precedence balloted for in 1793 (Leicestershire was 2nd) remained in force throughout the French Revolutionary War. Another ballot for precedence took place in 1803 at the start of the Napoleonic War, when Leicestershire was 36th. This order continued until 1833. In that year the King drew the lots for individual regiments and the resulting list remained in force with minor amendments until the end of the militia. The regiments raised before the peace of 1763 took the first 47 places; the Leicesters were placed at 26th, and this was retained when the list was revised in 1855. Most militia regiments ignored the numeral.

=== Commanders ===
Commanders of the regiment included:

Colonels

- John Manners, 5th Duke of Rutland, appointed 21 May 1798, died 20 January 1857

Honorary Colonels

- Charles Manners, 6th Duke of Rutland, former major, appointed 21 April 1857, died 3 March 1888
- John Manners, 7th Duke of Rutland, appointed 11 August 1888, died 4 August 1906
- Henry Manners, 8th Duke of Rutland, appointed 6 October 1906, died 8 May 1925

Lieutenant-Colonels commanding

- John King, appointed 24 July 1839
- Sir Frederick Fowke, 2nd Baronet, promoted 1 September 1869
- R.W. Worswick promoted 15 October 1881
- W. Pearson promoted 28 May 1892
- Alfred, 5th Lord Braye, promoted 22 December 1897
- Benjamin Humfrey, promoted 13 February 1904
- W.L. Rocke, appointed 29 February 1908
- Charles Palmer, promoted 28 February 1914

== See also ==
- Trained bands
- Militia (England)
- Militia (Great Britain)
- Militia (United Kingdom)
- Royal Leicestershire Regiment
