= Samuel Clowes (Conservative politician) =

Samuel William Clowes (27 January 1821 – 31 December 1898) was an English Conservative politician who sat in the House of Commons from 1868 to 1880.

Clowes was the son of Lieutenant-colonel William Legh Clowes, 3rd Dragoons, of Broughton Hall, Lancashire and his wife who was a daughter of Rev. Robert Holden of Aston Hall, Derby. He was educated at Rugby School and at Brasenose College, Oxford graduating B.A. in 1843. He was a captain in the South Nottinghamshire Yeomanry Cavalry and was a J.P. for Leicestershire.

Clowes stood for parliament unsuccessfully at South Derbyshire in 1857. At the 1868 general election he was elected Member of Parliament for North Leicestershire. He held the seat until 1880. He was appointed High Sheriff of Derbyshire for 1888.

Clowes died at the age of 77. He had married firstly on 1 May 1852, Sophia Louisa Button daughter of Sir Richard Button, 2nd Baronet. She died in February 1853 and Clowes married secondly in December 1863, the Hon. Adelaide Cavendish, daughter of Henry Cavendish, 3rd Baron Waterpark. His son Henry Arthur Clowes was High Sheriff of Derbyshire in 1908.

Parliament of the United Kingdom
Preceded by Edward Bourchier Hartopp; Lord John Manners	Member of Parliament for North Leicestershire; 1868 – 1880; With: Lord John Manners	Succeeded by Edwyn Sherard Burnaby; Lord John Manners
