= North Leicestershire =

Parliamentary constituency in the United Kingdom, 1832–1885

- Former county constituency for the House of Commons
- County: Leicestershire

1832–1885
- Seats: Two
- Created from: Leicestershire
- Replaced by: Loughborough and Melton

North Leicestershire, formally the "Northern Division of Leicestershire", was a county constituency represented in the House of Commons of the Parliament of the United Kingdom. It elected two Members of Parliament (MPs) by the bloc vote system of election.

== Boundaries ==
1832–1885: The Hundreds of West Goscote, East Goscote and Framland, and the two detached portions of the Hundred of Gartree situated on the east of the Hundred of East Goscote (the parishes of Baggrave, Burrough, Knossington, Marefield, Pickwell-cum-Leesthorpe, Ouston, and Newbold-Saucey).

== History ==
The constituency was created by the Reform Act 1832 for the 1832 general election, when the two-seat Leicestershire constituency was replaced by the Northern and Southern divisions, each of which elected two MPs.

Both divisions were abolished by the Redistribution of Seats Act 1885 for the 1885 general election, when they were replaced by four new single-seat constituencies: Bosworth, Harborough, Loughborough and Melton.

== Members of Parliament ==
Election	1st Member	1st Party	2nd Member	2nd Party
1832	Lord Robert Manners	Tory	Charles March-Phillipps	Radical
1834	Lord Robert Manners	Conservative	Charles March-Phillipps	Radical
1835 by-election	Lord Charles Manners	Conservative	Charles March-Phillipps	Radical
1837	Lord Charles Manners	Conservative	Edward Basil Farnham	Conservative
1852	Marquess of Granby	Conservative	Edward Basil Farnham	Conservative
1857 by-election	Lord John Manners	Conservative	Edward Basil Farnham	Conservative
1859	Lord John Manners	Conservative	Edward Bourchier Hartopp	Conservative
1868	Lord John Manners	Conservative	Samuel Clowes	Conservative
1880	Lord John Manners	Conservative	Edwyn Burnaby	Conservative
1883 by-election	Lord John Manners	Conservative	Hon. Montagu Curzon	Conservative
1885	Redistribution of Seats Act: constituency abolished			

== Election results ==
=== Elections in the 1830s ===
General election 1832: North Leicestershire
Party	Candidate	Votes	%
Tory	Lord Robert Manners	2,093	46.8
Radical	Charles March-Phillipps	1,661	37.1
Radical	William Augustus Johnson	720	16.1
Turnout		3,063	83.7
Registered electors		3,658	
Majority		432	9.7
Tory win (new seat)			
Majority		941	21.0
Radical win (new seat)			

General election 1835: North Leicestershire
Party	Candidate	Votes	%
Conservative	Lord Robert Manners	Unopposed	
Radical	Charles March-Phillipps	Unopposed	
Registered electors		3,806	
Conservative hold			
Radical hold			

Manners' death caused a by-election.

By-election, 29 December 1835: North Leicestershire
Party	Candidate	Votes	%
Conservative	Lord Charles Manners	Unopposed	
Conservative hold			

General election 1837: North Leicestershire
Party	Candidate	Votes	%	±%
Conservative	Lord Charles Manners	Unopposed		
Conservative	Edward Basil Farnham	Unopposed		
Registered electors		4,160		
Conservative hold				
Conservative gain from Radical				

=== Elections in the 1840s ===
General election 1841: North Leicestershire
Party	Candidate	Votes	%	±%
Conservative	Lord Charles Manners	Unopposed		
Conservative	Edward Basil Farnham	Unopposed		
Registered electors		4,211		
Conservative hold				
Conservative hold				

General election 1847: North Leicestershire
Party	Candidate	Votes	%	±%
Conservative	Lord Charles Manners	Unopposed		
Conservative	Edward Basil Farnham	Unopposed		
Registered electors		4,177		
Conservative hold				
Conservative hold				

=== Elections in the 1850s ===
General election 1852: North Leicestershire
Party	Candidate	Votes	%	±%
Conservative	Marquess of Granby	Unopposed		
Conservative	Edward Basil Farnham	Unopposed		
Registered electors		4,097		
Conservative hold				
Conservative hold				

Manners succeeded to the peerage, becoming 6th Duke of Rutland and causing a by-election.

By-election, 2 March 1857: North Leicestershire
Party	Candidate	Votes	%	±%
Conservative	Lord John Manners	Unopposed		
Conservative hold				

General election 1857: North Leicestershire
Party	Candidate	Votes	%	±%
Conservative	Lord John Manners	1,787	37.5	N/A
Conservative	Edward Basil Farnham	1,733	36.3	N/A
Ind. Conservative	Charles Frewen	1,250	26.2	New
Majority		483	10.1	N/A
Turnout		3,010 (est)	77.4 (est)	N/A
Registered electors		3,890		
Conservative hold		Swing	N/A	
Conservative hold		Swing	N/A	

Manners was appointed First Commissioner of Works, requiring a by-election.

By-election, 8 March 1858: North Leicestershire
Party	Candidate	Votes	%	±%
Conservative	Lord John Manners	Unopposed		
Conservative hold				

General election 1859: North Leicestershire
Party	Candidate	Votes	%	±%
Conservative	Lord John Manners	2,220	39.6	+2.1
Conservative	Edward Bourchier Hartopp	1,954	34.8	−1.5
Ind. Conservative	Charles Frewen	1,433	25.6	−0.6
Majority		521	9.2	−0.9
Turnout		3,520 (est)	81.3 (est)	+3.9
Registered electors		4,330		
Conservative hold		Swing	+1.2	
Conservative hold		Swing	−0.6	

=== Elections in the 1860s ===
General election 1865: North Leicestershire
Party	Candidate	Votes	%	±%
Conservative	Lord John Manners	2,305	40.0	+0.4
Conservative	Edward Bourchier Hartopp	1,854	32.2	−2.6
Ind. Conservative	Charles Frewen	1,599	27.8	+2.2
Majority		255	4.4	−4.8
Turnout		3,679 (est)	77.2 (est)	−4.1
Registered electors		4,767		
Conservative hold		Swing	−0.4	
Conservative hold		Swing	−1.9	

Manners was appointed First Commissioner of Works, requiring a by-election.

By-election, 14 July 1866: North Leicestershire
Party	Candidate	Votes	%	±%
Conservative	Lord John Manners	Unopposed		
Conservative hold				

General election 1868: North Leicestershire
Party	Candidate	Votes	%	±%
Conservative	Lord John Manners	3,296	40.5	+0.5
Conservative	Samuel Clowes	3,092	38.0	+5.8
Ind. Conservative	Charles Frewen	1,750	21.5	−6.3
Conservative	George Manners	9	0.1	N/A
Majority		1,342	16.5	+12.1
Turnout		4,074 (est)	64.2 (est)	−13.0
Registered electors		6,348		
Conservative hold		Swing	+1.8	
Conservative hold		Swing	+4.5	

=== Elections in the 1870s ===
General election 1874: North Leicestershire
Party	Candidate	Votes	%	±%
Conservative	Lord John Manners	2,978	39.5	−1.0
Conservative	Samuel Clowes	2,568	34.0	−4.0
Liberal	Hussey Packe	1,997	26.5	New
Majority		571	7.5	−9.0
Turnout		4,770 (est)	79.9 (est)	+15.7
Registered electors		5,968		
Conservative hold		Swing		
Conservative hold		Swing		

Manners was appointed Postmaster General of the United Kingdom, requiring a by-election.

By-election, 20 Mar 1874: North Leicestershire
Party	Candidate	Votes	%	±%
Conservative	Lord John Manners	Unopposed		
Conservative hold				

=== Elections in the 1880s ===
General election 1880: North Leicestershire
Party	Candidate	Votes	%	±%
Conservative	Lord John Manners	3,213	36.3	−3.2
Conservative	Edwyn Burnaby	2,991	33.8	−0.2
Liberal	Hussey Packe	2,651	29.9	+3.4
Majority		340	3.9	−3.6
Turnout		5,864 (est)	88.6 (est)	+8.7
Registered electors		6,619		
Conservative hold		Swing		
Conservative hold		Swing		

Burnaby's death caused a by-election.

By-election, 18 June 1883: North Leicestershire
Party	Candidate	Votes	%	±%
Conservative	Montagu Curzon	Unopposed		
Conservative hold				

Manners was appointed Postmaster General of the United Kingdom, requiring a by-election.

By-election, 2 July 1885: North Leicestershire
Party	Candidate	Votes	%	±%
Conservative	Lord John Manners	Unopposed		
Conservative hold				

== Sources ==
- F W S Craig, British Parliamentary Election Results 1832–1885 (2nd edition, Aldershot: Parliamentary Research Services, 1989)
- Leigh Rayment's Historical List of MPs – Constituencies beginning with "L" (part 2)
