= Charles Manners, 6th Duke of Rutland =

British nobleman and politician (1815–1888)

His Grace The Duke of Rutland KG
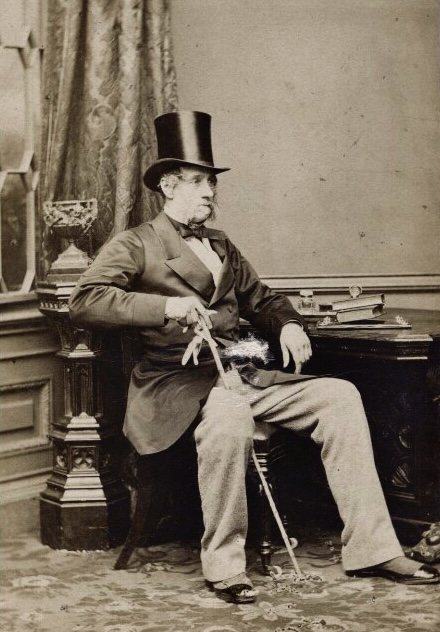
- Photograph of The Duke of Rutland by John Jabez Edwin Mayall, 1860s

Lord Lieutenant of Leicestershire
- In office 13 February 1857 – 3 March 1888
- Preceded by: The Duke of Rutland
- Succeeded by: The Earl Howe

Member of Parliament for North Leicestershire
- In office 1852–1857
- Preceded by: Lord Charles Manners; Edward Farnham
- Succeeded by: Edward Farnham; John Manners

Member of Parliament for Stamford
- In office 1837–1852
- Preceded by: Thomas Chaplin; George Finch
- Succeeded by: J. C. Herries; Sir Frederic Thesiger

Personal details
- Born: 16 May 1815
- Died: 3 March 1888 (aged 72) Belvoir Castle, Leicestershire, England
- Party: Conservative
- Parents: John Manners, 5th Duke of Rutland (father); Lady Elizabeth Howard (mother)
- Relatives: John Manners (brother); George Manners (brother); Emmeline Manners (sister)
- Education: Eton College; Trinity College, Cambridge

Charles Cecil John Manners, 6th Duke of Rutland KG (16 May 1815 – 3 March 1888, in Belvoir Castle), styled Marquess of Granby before 1857, was an English Conservative politician.

== Background and education ==
Manners was the third but eldest surviving son of John Manners, 5th Duke of Rutland and Lady Elizabeth Howard, daughter of Frederick Howard, 5th Earl of Carlisle. John Manners, 7th Duke of Rutland and Lord George Manners were his younger brothers. He was educated at Eton and Trinity College, Cambridge, earning an MA in 1835.

In 1839 his father, as Lord Lieutenant of Leicestershire and colonel of the regiment, commissioned him as major of the disembodied Leicestershire Militia. On his father's death he was appointed the regiment's first Honorary Colonel.

== Political career ==
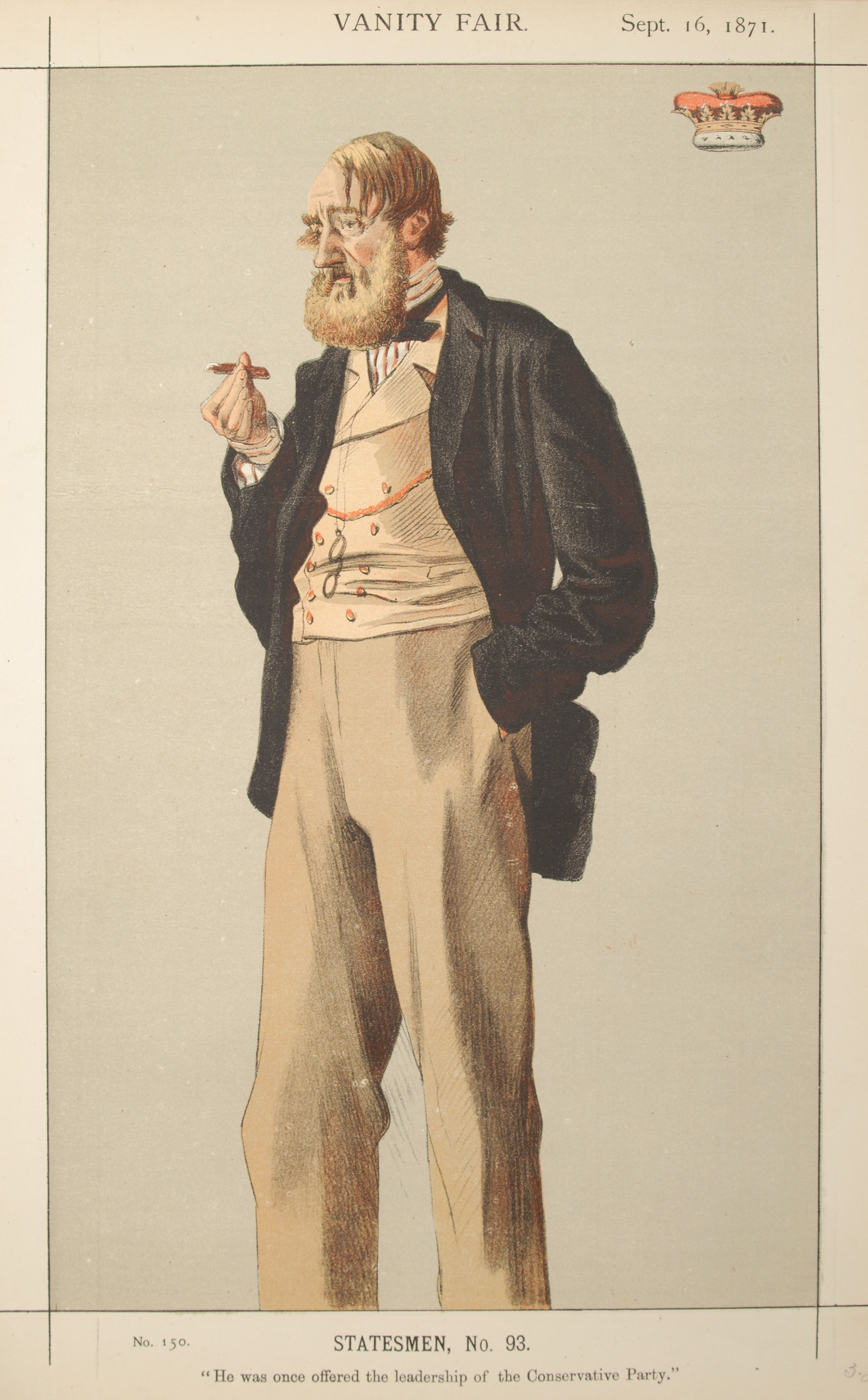
Caricature by Coïdé published in Vanity Fair in 1871.

Entering politics as Member of Parliament for Stamford in 1837, Manners became known as a voluble, if not particularly talented, protectionist. He briefly held office as a Lord of the Bedchamber to Prince Albert from 1843 to 1846. Following the resignation of Lord George Bentinck from the leadership of the protectionists in the House of Commons at the beginning of 1848, Granby (as he was then known) became the leader on 10 February 1848, as Benjamin Disraeli was unacceptable to Lord Derby, the overall leader of the party, and the majority of the rank and file. Granby resigned on 4 March 1848, feeling himself inadequate to the post, and the party functioned without an actual leader in the Commons for the remainder of the parliamentary session.

At the start of the next session, affairs were handled by the triumvirate of Granby, Disraeli, and J. C. Herries. This confusing arrangement ended with Granby's resignation in 1851. He also declined to join the First Derby Ministry in 1852, and was appointed Lord Lieutenant of Lincolnshire instead. Granby succeeded to the dukedom of Rutland on the death of his father in 1857. He was made a Knight of the Garter in 1867. He also succeeded his father as Lord Lieutenant of Leicestershire, which post he held until his death on 4 March 1888, at the age of 72.

== Personal life ==
Rutland never married. He had cherished a passion for Mary Anne Ricketts, later Lady Forester, but his father forbade the two to marry. He was also devoted to Lady Miles, wife of Sir Philip Miles, and scandalised society by leaving her his 120 ft yacht, Lufra, in his will. He was succeeded in the dukedom by his brother John.

He owned 70,000 acres with most 30,000 acres in Leicester, 27,000 acres in Derby and 6,500 acres in Cambridge.

== Coat of arms ==
Coat of arms of Charles Manners, 6th Duke of Rutland
Coronet A Coronet of a Duke Crest On a Chapeau Gules turned up Ermine a Peacock in its pride proper Escutcheon Or two Bars Azure a Chief quarterly of the last and Gules, in the first and fourth, two Fleur-de-lis, and in the second and third, a Lion passant guardant, all Or Supporters On either side a Unicorn Argent armed, maned, tufted and unguled Or Motto Pour Y Parvenir ("So as to accomplish it") Orders The Garter circlet; motto: Honi soit qui mal y pense (Shame be to him who thinks evil of it).

== Notes ==
Parliament of the United Kingdom
Preceded by Thomas Chaplin; George Finch	Member of Parliament for Stamford; 1837–1852; With: Thomas Chaplin 1837–1838; Sir George Clerk, Bt 1838–1847; John Charles Herries 1847–1852	Succeeded by J. C. Herries; Sir Frederic Thesiger
Preceded by Lord Charles Manners; Edward Farnham	Member of Parliament for North Leicestershire; 1852–1857; With: Edward Farnham 1852–1857	Succeeded by Edward Farnham; Lord John Manners
Honorary titles
Preceded by The Earl Brownlow	Lord Lieutenant of Lincolnshire; 1852–1857	Succeeded by The Earl of Yarborough
Preceded by The Duke of Rutland	Lord Lieutenant of Leicestershire; 1857–1888	Succeeded by The Earl Howe
Party political offices
Preceded by Lord George Bentinck	Conservative Leader of the Commons; 1848	Succeeded by Vacancy
Preceded by Vacancy	Conservative Leader of the Commons with Benjamin Disraeli and J. C. Herries; 1849–1851	Succeeded by Benjamin Disraeli
Peerage of England
Preceded by John Manners	Duke of Rutland; 1857–1888	Succeeded by John Manners
