= Charles Manners, 4th Duke of Rutland =

British politician (1754-1787)

His Grace The Duke of Rutland KG PC
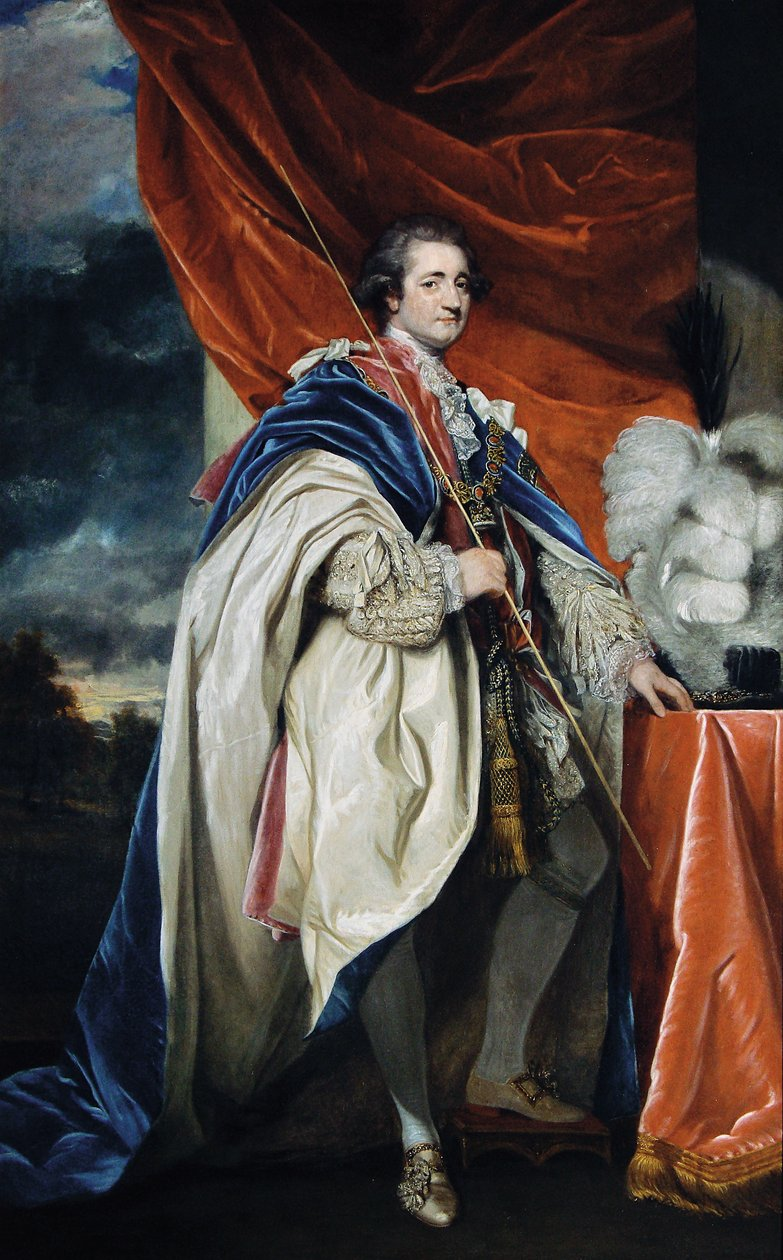
- Portrait by Sir Joshua Reynolds, c. 1782–1787

Lord Lieutenant of Ireland
- In office 12 February 1784 – 24 October 1787
- Monarch: George III
- Preceded by: The Earl of Northington
- Succeeded by: The Marquess of Buckingham

Lord Privy Seal
- In office 23 December 1783 – 27 November 1784
- Monarch: George III
- Prime Minister: William Pitt
- Preceded by: The Earl of Carlisle
- Succeeded by: The Marquess of Stafford

Member of Parliament for Cambridge University
- In office 1774–1779
- Preceded by: Thomas Townshend
- Succeeded by: James Mansfield

Personal details
- Born: 15 March 1754
- Died: 24 October 1787 (aged 33) Dublin, Ireland
- Resting place: St Mary the Virgin's Church, Bottesford
- Spouse: Lady Mary Isabella Somerset
- Children: 6, including John, Charles, and Robert
- Parents: John Manners, Marquess of Granby; Lady Frances Seymour

Charles Manners, 4th Duke of Rutland KG PC (15 March 1754 – 24 October 1787) was a British politician who was the eldest legitimate son of John Manners, Marquess of Granby. He was styled Lord Roos from 1760 until 1770, and Marquess of Granby from 1770 to 1779.

== Early life and family ==
Manners was educated at Eton and Trinity College, Cambridge, graduating the latter with a nobleman's MA in 1774. That year, he was elected as one of two members of parliament for Cambridge University. He continued to maintain the family's substantial electoral interests, and to collect objets d'art to decorate Belvoir Castle. He pledged to redeem his father's substantial debts, but was hampered by his passion for gambling.

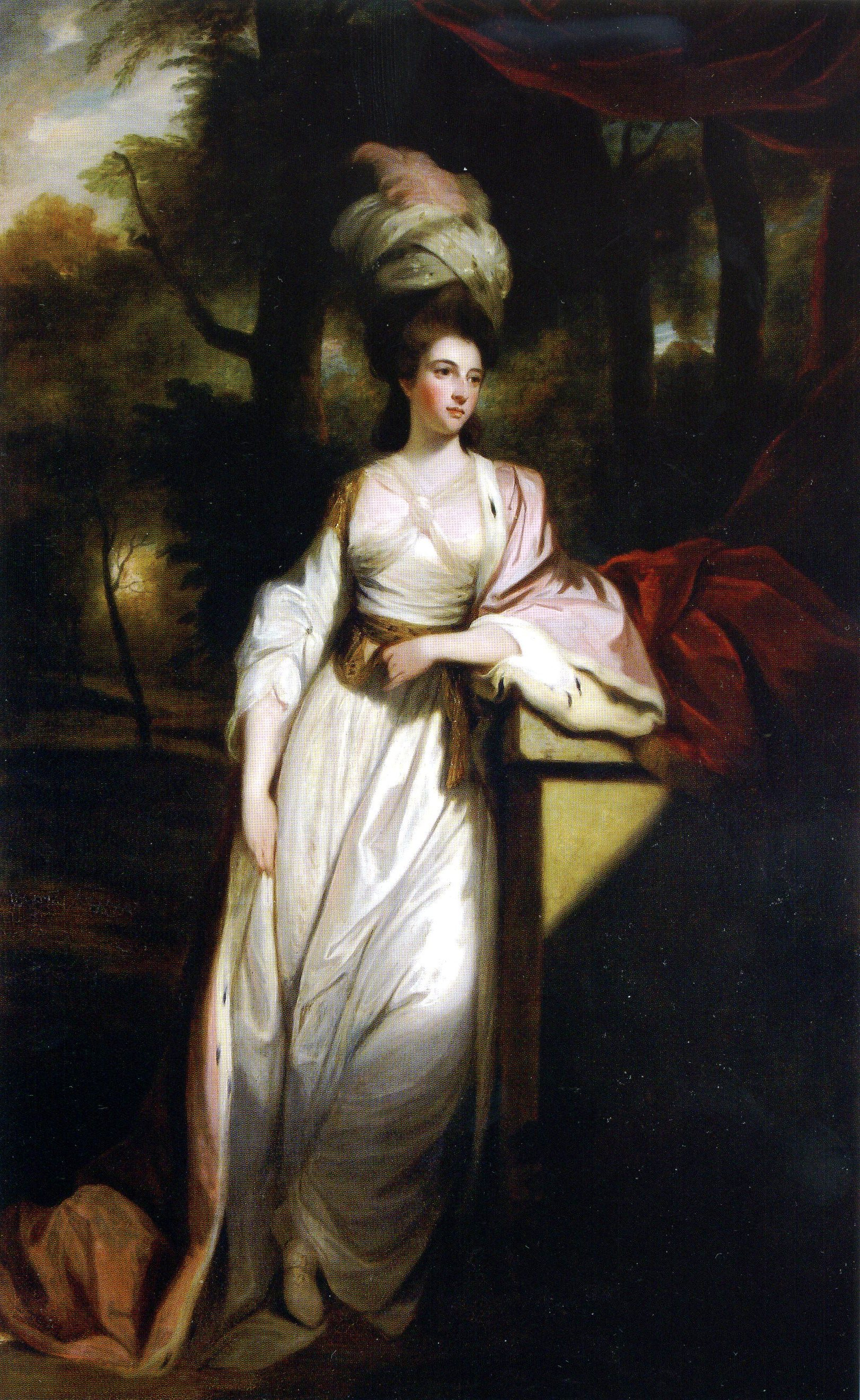
Mary Isabella, Duchess of Rutland

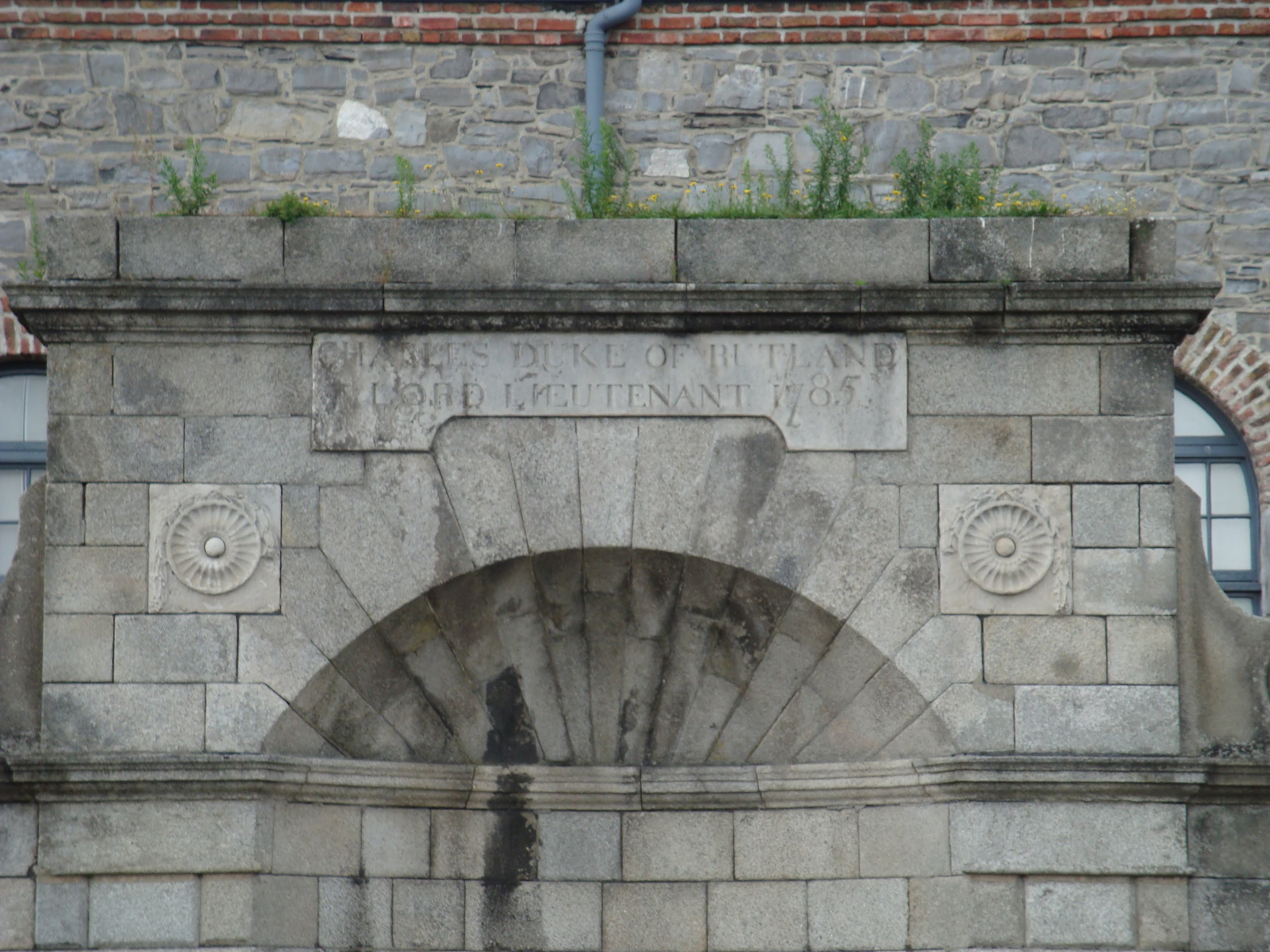
Inscription to Charles Manners, 4th Duke of Rutland, Collins Barracks Dublin

On 26 December 1775, he married Lady Mary Isabella Somerset (died 1831), daughter of Charles Somerset, 4th Duke of Beaufort and a celebrated beauty, renowned for her elegance and good taste. She was one of the most prominent society hostesses, and Sir Joshua Reynolds painted her portrait four times. Charles and Mary had six children:

- Lady Elizabeth Isabella Manners (died 5 October 1853), married on 21 August 1798 Richard Norman (nephew of Admiral John Montagu); their son Rev. Canon John Frederic Norman married his first cousin Lady Adeliza Elizabeth Gertrude Manners (daughter of the 5th Duke)
- John Henry Manners, 5th Duke of Rutland (1778–1857)
- Lady Katherine Mary Manners (died 1 May 1829), married on 16 June 1800 Cecil Weld-Forester, 1st Baron Forester
- General Lord Charles Henry Somerset Manners (24 October 1780 – 25 May 1855), died unmarried
- Major-General Lord Robert William Manners (14 December 1781 – 15 November 1835)
- Lord William Robert Albanac Manners (1783–1793)

Later in life, he was said to have been the lover of Elizabeth Billington.

== Parliament ==
Granby entered parliament in opposition to the North Ministry and as an ally to the Rockingham Whigs. He acted only as an observer until reaching his majority, and made his maiden speech on 5 April 1775, advocating free trade with the southern American Colonies. The speech brought him thanks from his father's friend Chatham, whom he praised, and initiated a friendship with William Pitt the Younger. It much disappointed the Court, and particularly Lord Mansfield, who had thought to govern the young Granby. During the American Revolution, he followed Chatham in urging reconciliation with America, and was one of those who questioned the conduct of Admiral Keppel in March 1779. He did not follow this up, and does not seem to have spoken in Parliament afterwards, acceding to the dukedom on 29 May 1779. He was able to obtain a seat for his friend Pitt at Appleby in 1780 when Pitt failed in an election for Cambridge University, and promised him a seat in one of the boroughs of the Rutland interest in the future. His own Parliamentary interest notwithstanding, he supported Pitt's plans for reform, and the two men remained friends for life.

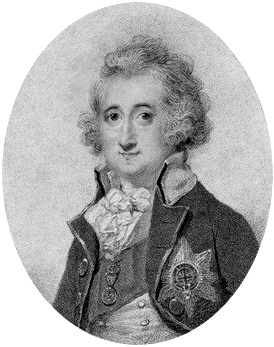
The 4th Duke of Rutland

== Political appointments ==
With the entry of the French into the war, he became colonel of the Leicestershire militia, and was created Lord Lieutenant of Leicestershire on 9 July 1779, an honour bestowed by George III in person. On 30 October 1782, he was made a Knight of the Garter and was made Lord Steward of the Household and sworn of the Privy Council on 17 February 1783. Shelburne thus brought him into the cabinet; but the appointment met with royal disfavour and prompted the resignation of Grafton and the collapse of the ministry. Rutland was by now an ally of Pitt, and upon his premiership, became Lord Privy Seal in December 1783.

Rutland was made Lord Lieutenant of Ireland on 11 February 1784. He was enthusiastic for Pitt's Irish policy and the legislative union which it entailed, but became increasingly doubtful of its implementation. In 1785, Pitt and Rutland successfully worked a trade plan through the Irish Parliament, initially against the opposition of Henry Grattan and Henry Flood. However, the Foxite opposition in the British House of Commons so gutted the measure with amendments that it was rejected in its new form in Ireland. While the Irish opposition was later reconciled to Pitt's bona fides with regard to trade, the episode demoralized Thomas Orde, the Chief Secretary of Ireland, and further hindered efforts at reform.

Rutland was increasingly popular as viceroy, in part because of his convivial nature and ample banquets at Dublin Castle. In the summer of 1787, he made an extended and rigorous tour of the midlands and north of Ireland, but his excessive consumption of claret was by now taking a toll upon his health. He died of liver disease on 24 October 1787 at the Viceregal Lodge in the Phoenix Park, Dublin.

The Rutland Fountain in Merrion Square, Dublin was dedicated to his memory.

== Coat of arms ==
Coat of arms of Charles Manners, 4th Duke of Rutland
Coronet A Coronet of a Duke Crest On a Chapeau Gules turned up Ermine a Peacock in its pride proper Escutcheon Or two Bars Azure a Chief quarterly of the last and Gules, in the first and fourth, two Fleur-de-lis, and in the second and third, a Lion passant guardant, all Or Supporters On either side a Unicorn Argent armed, maned, tufted and unguled Or Motto Pour Y Parvenir ("So as to accomplish it") Orders The Garter circlet; motto: Honi soit qui mal y pense (Shame be to him who thinks evil of it).

Parliament of Great Britain
Preceded by Thomas Townshend; Richard Croftes	Member of Parliament for Cambridge University; 1774 – 1779; With: Richard Croftes	Succeeded by Richard Croftes; James Mansfield
Political offices
Preceded by The Earl of Carlisle	Lord Steward; 1783	Succeeded by The Earl of Dartmouth
Preceded by The Earl of Carlisle	Lord Privy Seal; 1783–1784	Succeeded by The Earl Gower
Preceded by The Earl of Northington	Lord Lieutenant of Ireland; 1784–1787	Succeeded by The Marquess of Buckingham
Honorary titles
Preceded by The Duke of Rutland	Lord Lieutenant of Leicestershire; 1779–1787	Succeeded by The Duke of Beaufort
Peerage of England
Preceded by John Manners	Duke of Rutland; 1779–1787	Succeeded by John Henry Manners
