= Charles March-Phillipps =

British Radical politician

Captain of the Leicestershire Yeomanry
- In office 1803-1807

Member of Parliament
- In office 1818-1820
- Constituency: Leicestershire
- In office 1831-1837
- Constituency: North Leicestershire

High Sheriff of Leicestershire
- In office 1825-1826

Personal details
- Born: 28 May 1779
- Died: 24 April 1862 (aged 82)
- Party: Radical
- Spouse: Harriet Ducarel
- Children: 3
- Education: Eton College, Sidney Sussex College

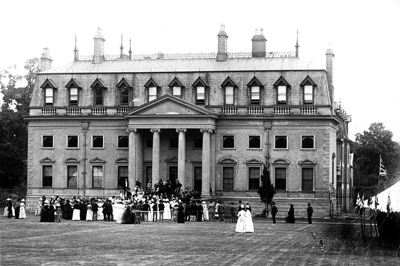
Garendon Hall, near Loughborough

Charles March-Phillipps (28 May 1779 – 24 April 1862) was a British Radical politician from Garendon Park in Leicestershire. He sat in the House of Commons in two periods between 1818 and 1837.

== Personal life ==
He was the eldest son of Thomas March Phillipps (formerly March) of Moor Crichel, Dorset, and was educated at Sherborne School (until 1791), Eton College (1793–1796) and Sidney Sussex College, Cambridge (1800–02). He was a captain in the Leicestershire Yeomanry from 1803 to 1807. He succeeded his father to Garendon Hall, Leicestershire, in 1817.

He married Harriet, the daughter of John Gustavus Ducarel of Walford, Somerset, and had two sons and a daughter. His son Ambrose Charles Lisle March Phillipps De Lisle converted to Roman Catholicism and founded Mount St Bernard Abbey.

== Political career ==
He was elected in the 1818 general election as one of the two Members of Parliament (MPs) for Leicestershire, and held the seat until 1820, when he did not contest the election. He returned again for the 1831 general election, and held the seat until the 1831 general election, when the county was divided under the Reform Act. He was then elected for the new Northern division of Leicestershire, and held the seat until he stood down at the 1837 general election.

He was appointed High Sheriff of Leicestershire from 1825 to 1826.

Parliament of the United Kingdom
Preceded by George Anthony Legh Keck; Lord Robert Manners	Member of Parliament for Leicestershire; 1818 – 1820; With: Lord Robert Manners	Succeeded by George Anthony Legh Keck; Lord Robert Manners
Preceded by Lord Robert Manners; George Anthony Legh Keck	Member of Parliament for Leicestershire; 1831 – 1832; With: Thomas Paget	Constituency divided
New constituency	Member of Parliament for North Leicestershire; 1832 – 1837; With: Lord Robert Manners 1832–1835; Lord Charles Manners from 1835	Succeeded by Edward Basil Farnham; Lord Charles Manners
