= Thomas Paget (MP for Leicestershire) =

Thomas Paget (30 December 1778 – 25 November 1862) was a banker and Whig politician in England.

He was born the only son of banker Thomas Paget of Ibstock, Leicestershire and founded the bank of Paget and Kirby in 1825, of which he was senior partner until his death.

He was elected as a member of parliament (MP) for Leicestershire in 1831, holding the seat until the constituency was divided at the 1832 general election. He was made Mayor of Leicester for 1836–37.

He married Anne, the daughter of John Pares of The Newarke, Leicester and Hopwell Hall, Derbyshire and had 2 sons. His eldest son Thomas and his grandson Guy both served as MPs for constituencies in Leicestershire. His second son John was a barrister and author.

Parliament of the United Kingdom
| Preceded by Lord Robert Manners; George Legh-Keck | Member of Parliament for Leicestershire; 1831 – 1832; With: Charles March-Phillipps | Constituency divided |
