= Stormberg =

Stormberg may refer to:

- Stormberg Mountains, Eastern Cape province, South Africa
- Stormberg District, Eastern Cape province of South Africa
- Stormberg Group, sedimentary geological formations in Karoo Basin, Southern Africa
- Battle of Stormberg, 1899 battle of the Second Boer War
- Stormberg AS, Norwegian sports clothes retail company

== See also ==
- Stormbergia, a genus of early ornithischian dinosaur
