= Lord Robert Manners (British Army officer, born 1781) =

British soldier (1781–1835)

Major-General Lord Robert Manners CB
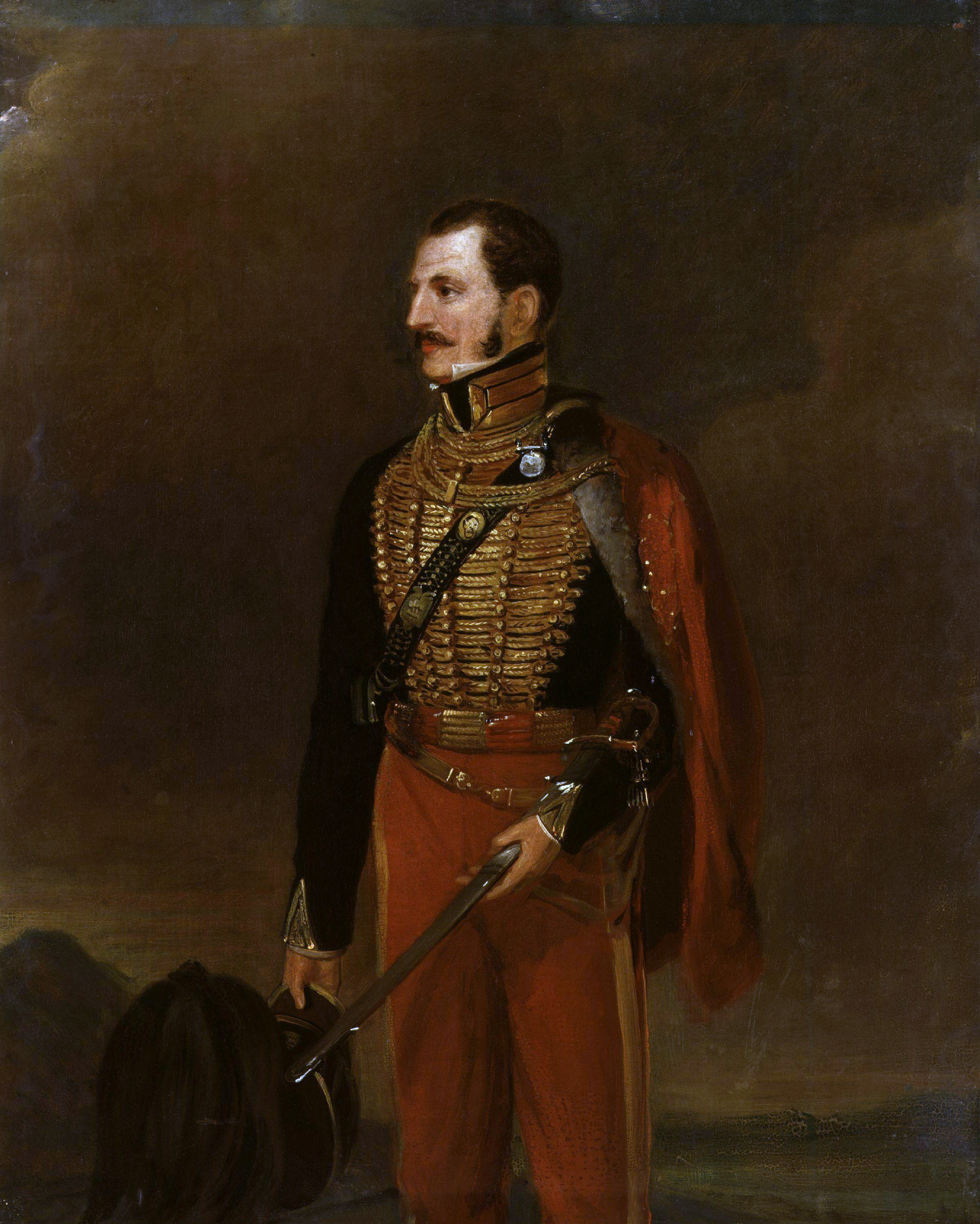
- Portrait by William Salter, 1834–1835
- Born: 14 December 1781
- Died: 15 November 1835 (aged 53) Belvoir Castle, Leicestershire, England

Major-General Lord Robert William Manners, CB (14 December 1781 – 15 November 1835) was a British soldier and nobleman.

== Life ==
He was the third son of Charles Manners, 4th Duke of Rutland and Lady Mary Somerset, daughter of Charles Somerset, 4th Duke of Beaufort. They were members of the Prince of Wales' set. He and his brother Charles Manners were among the financial supporters of their friend George Bryan Brummell, aka "Beau" Brummell, during his long exile in Calais and Caen. Lord Robert commanded the 10th (Prince of Wales's Own) Regiment of (Light) Dragoons (Hussars) during the Waterloo Campaign.

With a break of one year between 1831 and 1832, he represented various constituencies of the family interest in Parliament from 1802 until his death.

He died suddenly in the afternoon of 15 November 1835 at Belvoir Castle, Leicestershire, and was interred in the estate's mausoleum.

Parliament of the United Kingdom
Preceded by Edmund Phipps; Lord Charles Somerset	Member of Parliament for Scarborough; 1802 – 1806; With: Edmund Phipps	Succeeded by Edmund Phipps; Charles Manners-Sutton
Preceded by George Anthony Legh-Keck; Sir Edmund Cradock-Hartopp, Bt	Member of Parliament for Leicestershire; 1806 – 1831; With: George Anthony Legh-Keck 1806–1818, 1820–1831; Charles March-Phillipps 1818–1820	Succeeded by Charles March-Phillipps; Thomas Paget
New constituency	Member of Parliament for Leicestershire North; 1832 – 1835; With: Charles March-Phillipps	Succeeded by Charles March-Phillipps; Lord Charles Manners
