= Edward Bourchier Hartopp =

British politician

Member of the British Parliament for North Leicestershire
- In office 1859–1868

Personal details
- Party: Conservative

Edward Bourchier Hartopp (1808–1884) was a British politician. He was High Sheriff of Leicestershire. He was the Conservative MP for North Leicestershire 1859–1868.

Hartopp was born 14 December 1808, the son of Edward Hartopp and Anna Eleanora Wrey. He was educated at Eton and Christchurch, Oxford. In 1833 he was made High Sheriff of Leicestershire and was MP for North Leicestershire from 1859 to 1868. In 1834 he married Honoria Gent the daughter of Major-General William Gent. He owned the parishes of Burton Lazars, Scraptoft and Little Dalby.

He died 31 December 1884 at his residence at 21 Thurloe Square in London. His son, William Hartopp, was a first-class cricketer.
