= Lord Charles Manners (British Army officer, born 1780) =

British soldier and nobleman (1780-1855)

General Lord Charles Henry Somerset Manners, KCB (24 October 1780 – 25 May 1855) was a British soldier and nobleman, the second son of Charles Manners, 4th Duke of Rutland and Lady Mary Somerset.

He was lieutenant colonel of the 3rd in 1815, during the Waterloo campaign. After a brief appointment to the colonelcy of the 11th Regiment of (Light) Dragoons, he was transferred to the colonelcy of the 3rd (King's Own) Regiment of Dragoons which he retained until his death in 1855.

Parliament of the United Kingdom
Preceded by Charles Philip Yorke; Sir Henry Peyton, Bt	Member of Parliament for Cambridgeshire; 1802–1830; With: Charles Philip Yorke 1802–1810; Lord Francis Osborne 1810–1830	Succeeded by Lord Francis Osborne; Henry John Adeane
Preceded by Lord Robert William Manners; Charles March-Phillipps	Member of Parliament for Leicestershire North; 1835–1852; With: Charles March-Phillipps 1835–1837; Edward Farnham 1837–1852	Succeeded by Edward Farnham; Marquess of Granby
Military offices
Preceded by Lord William Bentinck	Colonel of the 11th Regiment of (Light) Dragoons; 1839	Succeeded by Philip Philpot
Preceded by Lord George Beresford	Colonel of the 3rd (The King's Own) Regiment of (Light) Dragoons; 1839–1855	Succeeded by Peter Latour
