= Honi soit qui mal y pense =

Anglo-Norman maxim

The motto appears on a representation of the garter, surrounding the Shield of the Royal coat of arms of the United Kingdom used outside Scotland.

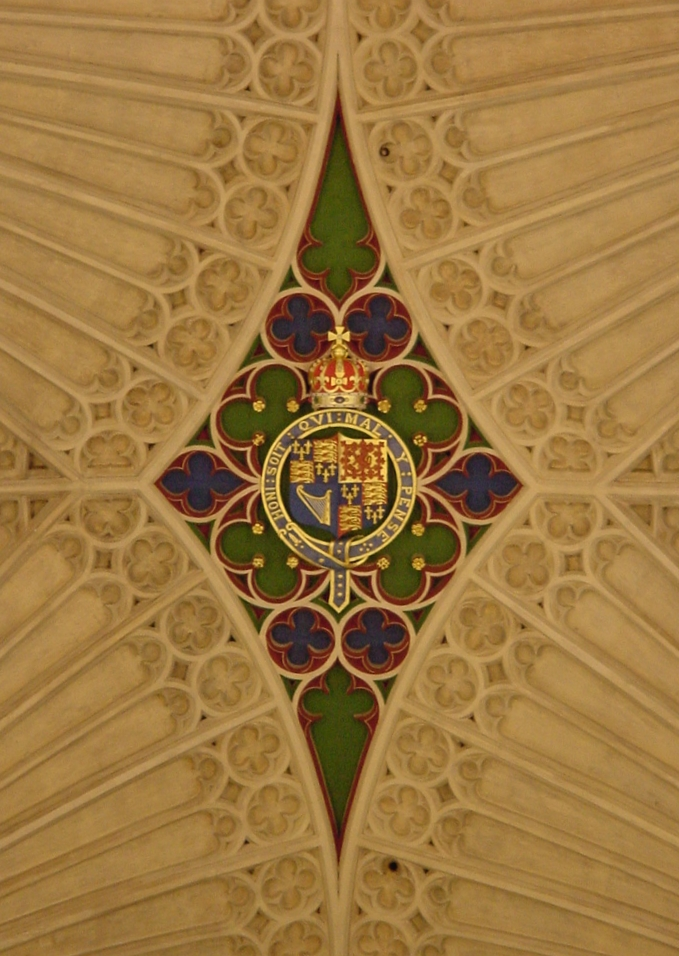
The motto appears in a royal coat of arms of the 17th century on the ceiling of Bath Abbey.

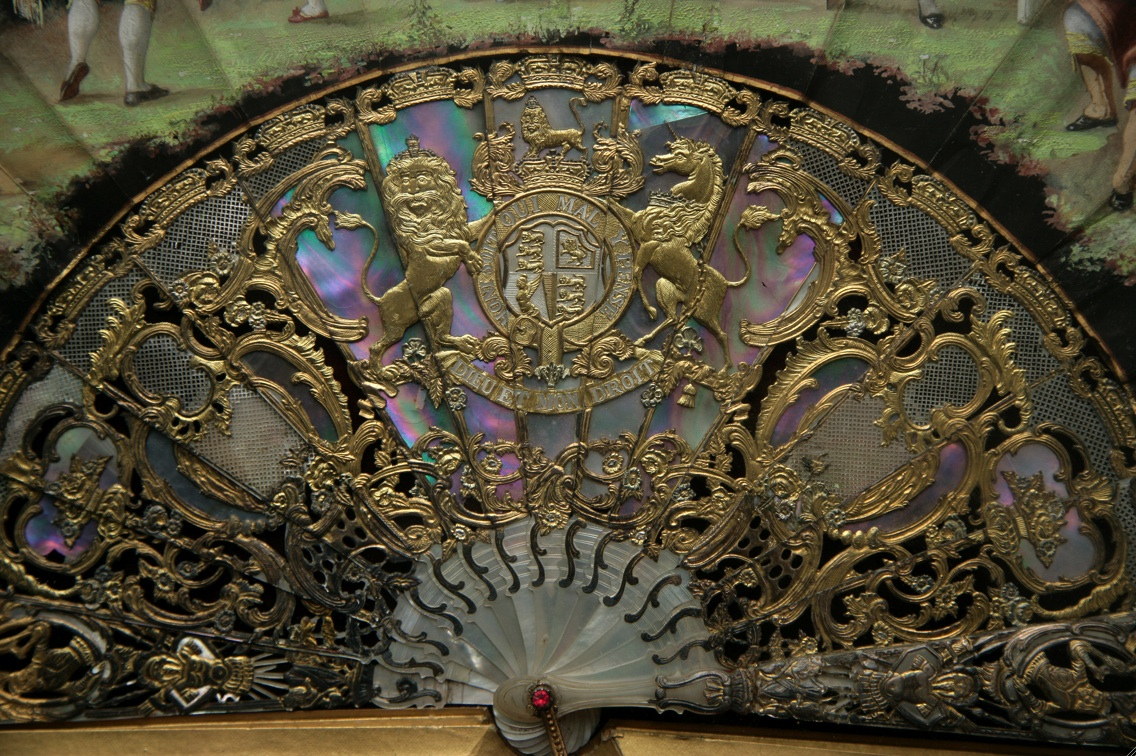
Hand fan of Queen Victoria with motto

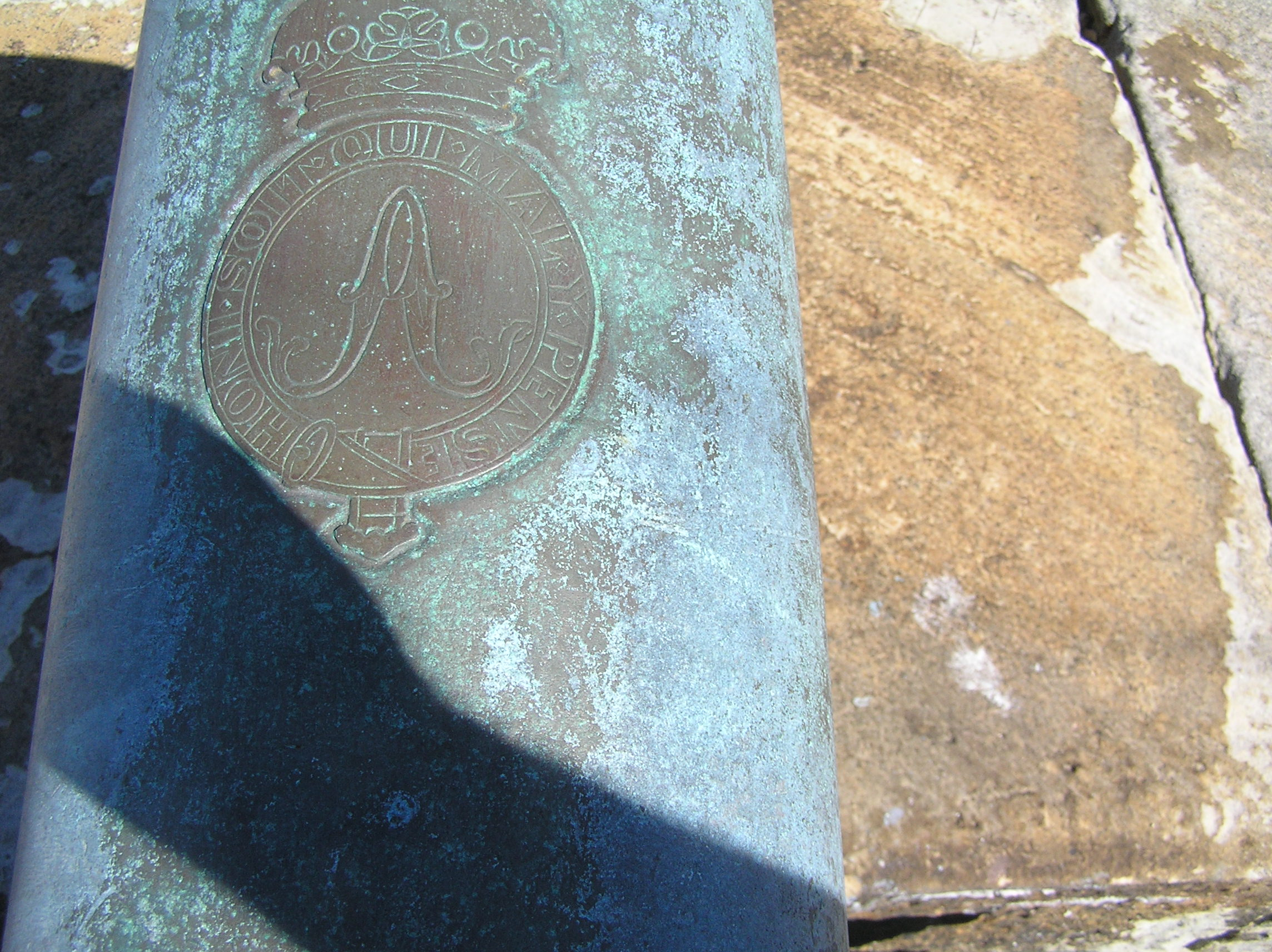
Motto on cannon at Fort Denison, Sydney

Honi soit qui mal y pense (UK: /ˌɒni ˌswɑː kiː ˌmæl i ˈpɒ̃s/, US: /- ˌmɑːl -/; French: [ɔni swa ki mal i pɑ̃s]) is a maxim in the Anglo-Norman language meaning "shamed be (the person) who thinks evil of it". Older translations state this as "evil be to him who thinks of evil". It is the motto of the Order of the Garter and several units of the British, Australian, Canadian and New Zealand armies.

== Origin ==
King Edward III founded the Order of the Garter around the time of his claim to the French throne. The traditional year of foundation is usually given as 1348 (when it was formally proclaimed).

While Polydore Vergil's Anglica Historia (1534) is traditionally cited as the source that popularized the "legend of the garter," a detailed account of the incident was already recorded nearly half a century earlier in the Valencian chivalric novel Tirant lo Blanch. Although first published in 1490, the work was written by Joanot Martorell between 1460 and 1464. In Chapter LXXXV, Martorell describes how King Edward III of England founded the Order of the Garter after picking up a blue silk garter dropped by a lady during a court dance. In response to the courtiers' mockery, the King placed the garter on his own leg and uttered the motto, which Martorell integrates into the narrative to explain the origin of the order's insignia.

Martorell likely encountered this tradition during his stay at the English court in London between 1438 and 1439, making his account one of the earliest known written records of the legend.

The historical basis for Martorell's stay in London (from March 1438 to February 1439) is documented through his "letters of battle" (lletres de batalla) addressed to Joan de Monpalau and a safe-conduct issued by Henry VI of England.

According to Polydore Vergil's Anglica Historia, written in 1512–1513, 166 years after the event, the origin was a trivial mishap at a court function. King Edward III was dancing with Joan of Kent, his first cousin and daughter-in-law, at a ball held in Calais to celebrate the fall of the city after the Battle of Crécy. Her garter slipped down to her ankle, causing those around her to laugh at her humiliation. Edward placed the garter around his own leg, saying: "Honi soit qui mal y pense. Tel qui s'en rit aujourd'hui, s'honorera de la porter." ("Shame on anyone who thinks evil of it. Whoever is laughing at this [thing] today will later be proud to wear it."). Scholars typically consider this version to be apocryphal, as there are no contemporary sources for it, and as garters were not worn by women at that time.

According to David Nash Ford:

While Edward III may outwardly have professed the Order of the Garter to be a revival of the Round Table, it is probable that privately its formation was a move to gain support for his dubious claim to the French throne. The motto of the Order is a denunciation of those who think ill of some specific project, and not a mere pious invocation of evil upon evil-thinkers in general. "Shame be to him who thinks ill of it" was probably directed against anyone who should oppose the King's design on the French Crown.

=== Sir Gawain and the Green Knight ===
The motto in Anglo-Norman, a dialect of Old Norman French spoken by the medieval ruling class in England, appears in the late 14th century Middle English poem Sir Gawain and the Green Knight as hony soyt qui mal pence, at the end of the text in the manuscript, albeit in a later hand. The poem is connected to the Order of the Garter. In the poem, a girdle, very similar in its erotic undertones to the garter, plays a prominent role. A rough equivalent of the Order's motto has been identified in Gawain's exclamation corsed worth cowarddyse and couetyse boþe ("cursed be both cowardice and coveting", v. 2374). While the author of the poem remains disputed, there seems to be a connection between two of the top candidates and the Order of the Garter, John of Gaunt, and Enguerrand de Coucy, seventh Sire de Coucy. De Coucy was married to King Edward III's daughter, Isabella, and was admitted to the Order of the Garter on their wedding day.

== Heraldic use ==
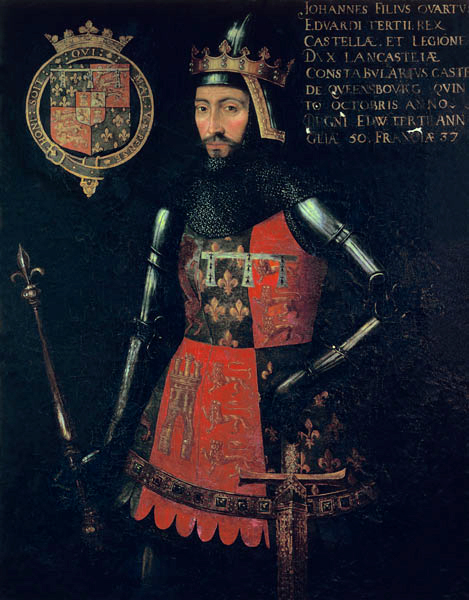
Arms of John of Gaunt include the garter and the motto Honi soit qui mal y pense. Picture from a 16th-century depiction

In English heraldry, the motto Honi soit qui mal y pense is used either as a stand-alone motto upon a motto scroll, or upon a circular representation of the Garter. Knights and Ladies of the Garter are entitled to encircle the escutcheon of their arms with the garter and motto (e.g. The 1st Duke of Marlborough).

The latter usage can also be seen in the royal coat of arms of the United Kingdom, with the motto of the royal arms, Dieu et mon droit, being displayed on a scroll beneath the shield. As part of the royal arms, the motto is displayed in many public buildings in Britain and colonial era public buildings in various parts of the Commonwealth (such as all Courts of England and Wales). The royal arms (and motto) appear on many British government official documents (e.g. the front of current British passports); on packaging and stationery of companies operating under Royal Warrant (e.g. the banner of The Times, which uses the royal coat of arms of Great Britain circa 1714 to 1800); and are used by other entities so distinguished by the British monarch (e.g. as the official emblem of the Royal Yacht Britannia).

Several military organisations in the Commonwealth incorporate the motto inscribed upon a garter of the order within their badges (or cyphers) and some use Honi soit qui mal y pense as their motto. Corps and regiments using the motto in this fashion are ('*' indicates usage as a motto in addition to inclusion in the badge):

- Also used on items, e.g., the baton, of the Society of High Constables of Edinburgh (founded 1611), along with the phrase ' nisi dominus frustra'.
- British Army: the Royal Horse Artillery; Household Cavalry Regiment; Life Guards (motto appears in the Garter Star representation worn on Life Guard officer's helmets rather than in the unit badge); Blues and Royals; Royal Engineers; Grenadier Guards*; Coldstream Guards; Princess of Wales's Royal Regiment; Royal Regiment of Fusiliers; and the Royal Logistic Corps (which in April 1993 became an amalgamation of the trades of five corps, which included the Royal Corps of Transport the Royal Army Ordnance Corps, The Royal Pioneer Corps, the Army Catering Corps and the Postal and Courier Services of the Royal Engineers, all of these forming Corps used the motto inscribed garter in their badge).
- Australian Army: the Royal Australian Engineers* (motto is one of two used); Royal Australian Army Service Corps (merged in 1973 into the newly raised RACT (and who did not use the motto), and the Royal Australian Army Ordnance Corps);
- Canadian Army: The Governor General's Horse Guards, The Royal Regiment of Canada, The Royal Montreal Regiment* and The Royal Canadian Horse Artillery.
- New Zealand Army: the 6th Hauraki Infantry Regiment.

== Other uses ==
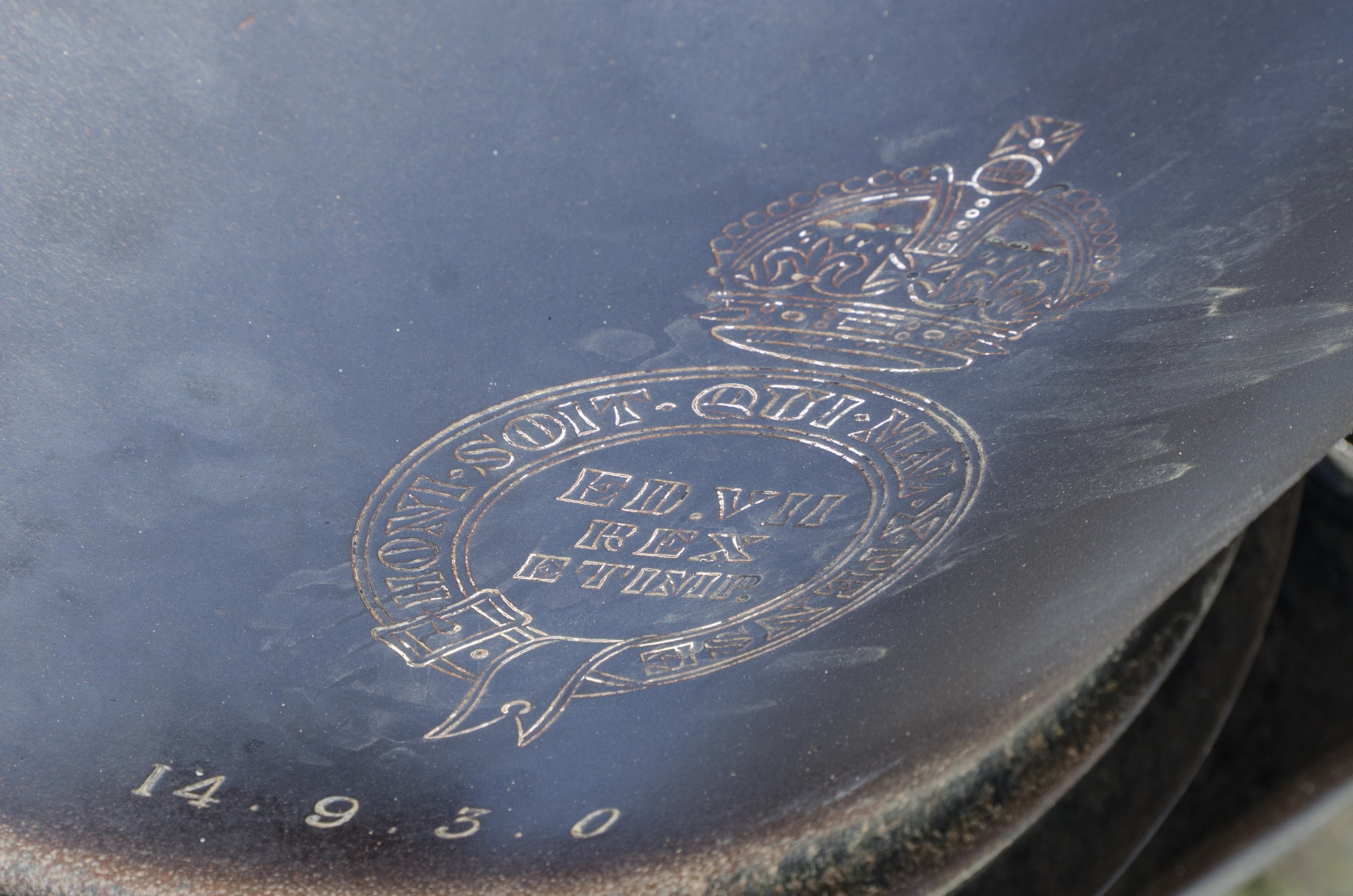
Motto on a cannon of Edward VII on Elephanta Island, India

- It appears on in the lower half of the coverpage for the Coverdale Bible where it surrounds the coat of arms of Henry VIII.
- It appears in The King's School, Grantham and Winchester College coats of arms.
- It appears on several British military cap badges including that of the Royal Engineers. The phrase is incorporated into the elaborate figurehead of HMS Victory, Horatio Nelson's flagship at the historic Battle of Trafalgar. Bounty mutineer James Morrison had the motto with a garter tattooed around his left leg, according to William Bligh's Notebook.
- It is a motto for many schools and educational institutions; the title of the University of Sydney student newspaper, Honi Soit, is derived from the motto.
- It appears in a number of literary works, including Robert Anton Wilson's Masks of the Illuminati, Robert A. Heinlein's Friday, Bernard Malamud's The Natural, Shakespeare's The Merry Wives of Windsor (Act V, Scene V), Thomas De Quincey's Confessions of an English Opium-Eater (Introduction to "The Pains of Opium"), Leo Tolstoy's Anna Karenina (Part 1, Chapter 17), Harold Brodkey’s short story “The Nurse’s Music,” and at the end of the late 14th-century Middle English Arthurian romance, Sir Gawain and the Green Knight.
- It appears in the stage directions of Giuseppe Verdi's Falstaff, libretto by Arrigo Boito, in Act 3, scene 1, where it is written above the door at the Garter Inn.
- It appears in the comments of the Apollo Guidance Computer assembly source code for the master ignition routine of the Lunar Module.
- It is sung in full as the chorus of John Cale's song "Honi Soit (La Première Leçon de Français)" featured on the 1981 album Honi Soit.
- It appears in the staff used by the Usher of the Black Rod of the Parliament of Canada. It also figures on the cap badge of the Royal Montreal Regiment.
- It is incorporated in the coat of arms of the Basilica of Saint Paul Outside the Walls in Rome.
- It is used as the motto of The Blue Book, a guide to prostitutes in Storyville, New Orleans published 1895–1915.
- It appears on the entry gates to pop star Michael Jackson's Neverland estate, and of the Victoria Memorial in Kolkata, India.
- It is a motto of the Fort Henry Guard, of Kingston, Ontario, and appears on the Shako worn by the guard.

== See also ==
- In my defens God me defend, the motto of the monarch of the United Kingdom for use in Scotland
- Nemo me impune lacessit, the motto of the Order of the Thistle
- Ich dien, the motto on the Prince of Wales's feathers
- Quis separabit?, the motto of the Order of St Patrick
