= Field Foundation of New York =

Charitable foundation

- Predecessor: Field Foundation; founded 1940; 86 years ago
- Formation: 1960; 66 years ago
- Founder: (Field Foundation) Marshall Field III (Field Foundation of NY) Ruth Field
- Founded at: New York City
- Dissolved: 1989; 37 years ago
- Legal status: Defunct
- Purpose: Grants and assistance to non-profit organizations promoting civil rights
- Headquarters: New York City, New York, US
- Director: Maxwell Hahn (1960–1965); Leslie W. Dunbar (1965–1977); Richard W. Boone (1977–1989)

The Field Foundation of New York was a charitable organization based in New York City. It was one of the two organizations that had split off from the original Field Foundation in 1960, the other being the Field Foundation of Illinois. The New York foundation focused on enacting social change on a more national scale than did the Illinois foundation; it had a history of supporting racial equality, researching hunger in the United States, and improving the lives of those stuck in poverty. It finally spent itself out of existence in 1989.

== History ==
=== Original Field Foundation ===
The Field Foundation was originally established in 1940 by Marshall Field III, the grandson of a well-known Chicago merchant who founded the famous Marshall Field's department store. It was founded in New York to help victims of the Great Depression, and it supported the ideas and methods of the President Roosevelt’s New Deal. Its board was composed of various business leaders, social scientists, judges, and scholars. The Foundation assisted other organizations supporting social change, civil rights, and child welfare, and also offered grants to groups such as the American Council on Race Relations, Provident Medical Associates in Chicago, and the Research Center for Human Relations in New York. By 1949, the Foundation’s assets totaled 11 million dollars and it offered grants of 150,000 dollars per year.

=== 1960 split ===
Field III died in 1956, after which the organization started splitting due to different goals its members had. Field’s son Marshall Field IV desired that the organization focus its efforts locally within Chicago, where most of the Foundation’s assets lay. Field’s widow, Ruth Field, wished for the organization to expand its efforts nationally and promote social change.

In 1960, the organization split into the Field Foundation of Illinois and the Field Foundation of New York.

== Accomplishments of the Field Foundation of New York ==
=== Maxwell Hahn ===
The Field Foundation has a long history with various social movements. It was originally directed by Maxwell Hahn, under which it supported racial integration in the South in the 1950s, leading larger foundations after it. It was also one of the first supporters of Black education campaigns, and focused heavily on child welfare and racial issues under Hahn.

=== Leslie W. Dunbar ===
In 1965, Leslie W. Dunbar, director of the Southern Regional Council, succeeded Hahn and moved the organization’s focus more on those struggling from poverty and minority groups. In 1967 its examination of the state of poor Southern communities led to an expansion of food stamp and school lunch programs. It also pushed for the recognition of black lung disease, being among the first to do so.

In 1970s the organization under Dunbar started to examine federal activities more closely, studying surveillance, arms programs, and civil liberties violations. Examples include the organization since 1972 donating $1,073,800 to the Center for Defense Information, a federal oversight organization that examines Defense spending and priorities. It was the largest funder of the organization. It also helped to save the Food Research and Action Center when its federal funds were cut under President Nixon in 1973. This led to disagreements within the organization over the government’s policies and affirmative action, eventually followed by Dunbar’s resignation in 1977.

=== Richard W. Boone ===
In 1977, American philanthropist Richard W. Boone became the director of the Foundation. Boone also believed in government oversight through independent organization. Under him, the Field Foundation funded the Study Group on Social Security, an organization monitoring Government reductions of benefits to the elderly, disabled, widows, and orphans. The Foundation became one of the earliest supporters of the Center on Budget and Policy Priorities in 1981, offering $175,000 in its first year and $150,000 in the second. Boone’s policies led the organization to support black voter registration programs, U.S. resettlement of IndoChina refugees, funded the Communications Consortium Media Center, and researched hunger in the U.S. In 1984, the foundation gave $30,000 to Nuclear Times, a magazine devoted to nuclear disarmament.

The organization purposefully spent itself out of existence in 1989, choosing to empower other social activism groups to continue its legacy.
