= Field Enterprises =

American media company

- Type: Private
- Industry: Media and publishing
- Founded: August 31, 1944; 82 years ago
- Founder: Marshall Field III
- Defunct: April 1984; 42 years ago
- Headquarters: Chicago, Illinois, U.S.
- Area served: United States
- Key people: Marshall Field IV, Peter W. Smith, Marshall Field V, Ted Field
- Services: Print syndication, newspapers, books
- Subsidiaries: Chicago Sun / Chicago Sun-Times (1944–1983); Parade magazine (1941–1958); Simon & Schuster (1944–1957); Pocket Books (1944–1957); World Book Encyclopedia (1945–1978); Chicago Sun Syndicate/Field Newspaper Syndicate/Chicago Sun-Times Syndicate/Publishers-Hall Syndicate (1941–1983); Chicago Daily News (1959–1978); Field Communications (1966–1983)

Field Enterprises, Inc. was a private holding company that operated from the 1940s to the 1980s, founded by Marshall Field III and others, whose main assets were the Chicago Sun and Parade magazine. For various periods of time, Field Enterprises also owned publishers Simon & Schuster and Pocket Books, broadcaster Field Communications, and the World Book Encyclopedia. It also operated a syndication service, Field Newspaper Syndicate, whose most popular offering was the comic strip Steve Canyon.

== History ==
Field had founded the Chicago Sun and the Chicago Sun Syndicate in late 1941.

Comic-strip historian Allan Holtz has written regarding the origins of the Field Syndicate and its relationship to the rest of the company:

Field . . . was a syndicate initially created by Marshall Field to sell features from his Chicago Sun newspaper. When Field started the Sun he found that Chicago was pretty much all sewed up with exclusive contracts on the better features. He resolved to purchase his own features and market them. Ironically, the Field Enterprises syndicate ended up being a better moneymaker than the Sun itself. It has been said that the flagship feature, Steve Canyon, was responsible for keeping the Sun afloat for many years.

In 1944, soon after its establishment, Field Enterprises acquired the book publishers Simon & Schuster and Pocket Books. The next year, the company acquired World Book Encyclopedia. In 1948, Field merged the Chicago Sun with the Chicago Daily Times to create the Chicago Sun-Times.

Marshall Field III died in 1956; his son Marshall Field IV took over. Simon & Schuster and Pocket Books were sold in 1957. Parade was sold the following year (to New York Herald Tribune publisher John Hay Whitney).

The company acquired the Chicago Daily News in 1959, publishing that newspaper until it folded in 1978 (the same year the company sold World Book Encyclopedia).

Marshall Field IV died in 1965. From 1969 to 1980 investment banker Peter W. Smith was a Field Enterprises senior officer.

In 1982, half-brothers Marshall Field V and Ted Field, who each controlled half of Field Enterprises, were at odds on how the company should operate, which left them unable to work together. The two men sold their most valuable asset, the Sun-Times (as well as the Field Newspaper Syndicate), to Rupert Murdoch's News Corporation in 1983 for US $90 million. Field Enterprises was dissolved in April 1984.
