= 1910 New Hampshire gubernatorial election =

- November 8, 1910
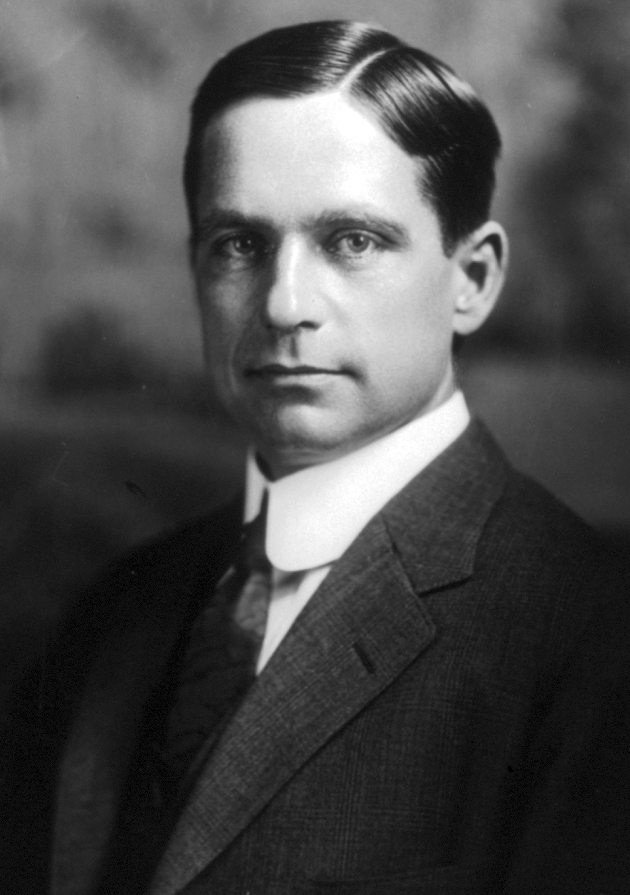

Nominee	Robert P. Bass	Clarence E. Carr
Party	Republican	Democratic
Popular vote	44,908	37,737
Percentage	53.36%	44.84%
- Bass: 40-50% 50–60% 60–70% 70–80% 80–90% >90% Carr: 40-50% 50–60% 60–70% 70–80% 80–90% Tie: 40-50%
Governor before election
Henry B. Quinby
Republican
Elected Governor
Robert P. Bass
Republican

The 1910 New Hampshire gubernatorial election was held on November 8, 1910. Republican nominee Robert P. Bass defeated Democratic nominee Clarence E. Carr with 53.36% of the vote.

== General election ==
=== Candidates ===
Major party candidates

- Robert P. Bass, Republican
- Clarence E. Carr, Democratic

Other candidates

- Ash Warren Drew, Socialist
- John C. Berry, Prohibition

=== Results ===
1910 New Hampshire gubernatorial election
Party	Candidate	Votes	%	±%
Republican	Robert P. Bass	44,908	53.36%	
Democratic	Clarence E. Carr	37,737	44.84%	
Socialist	Ash Warren Drew	1,100	1.31%	
Prohibition	John C. Berry	410	0.49%	
Majority		7,171		
Turnout				
Republican hold		Swing		
