= 1978 USAC Championship Car season =

Sports season

- USAC National Championship Citicorp Cup

Season
- Races: 18
- Start date: March 18
- End date: October 28

Awards
- National champion: (United States) Tom Sneva
- Indianapolis 500 winner: (United States) Al Unser

The 1978 USAC Championship Car season consisted of 18 races, beginning at Phoenix on March 18 and concluding at the same location on October 28. The USAC National Champion was Tom Sneva and the Indianapolis 500 winner was Al Unser. This was the last year before the first USAC/CART "Split". By winning the Indianapolis 500, Pocono 500, and California 500, Al Unser swept the Indy car "Triple Crown", the only driver in history to do so.

The 1978 season is also statistically noteworthy. Danny Ongais won the most races (5), and Al Unser swept the triple crown races, but it was Tom Sneva (who did not win a single race) who won the championship title. Sneva had six 2nd place finishes, and twelve top 5s, and seven poles (including Indianapolis and Ontario), and experienced more consistent finishes. Sneva became the second driver to win the USAC championship without winning a race during the season, the last being Tony Bettenhausen in 1958. Sneva's "winless" championship was not without its critics, however, a statistician calculated points results using contemporary points tables from other major racing series, and concluded that Sneva would have still won the title in nearly every scenario.

The 1978 season was also a break-out year for future champion Rick Mears. Mario Andretti was running the full Formula One season (of which he would be World Champion). Andretti was running a partial Indy car schedule for Penske Racing, and Roger Penske hired the young Mears to fill in for Andretti the weekends he was overseas. Mears, who had spent two years in lesser-funded rides, jumped at the opportunity to drive for Penske, even though it was only a part-time ride. Mears won Co-Rookie of the Year at Indy, won three races, and despite running only 11 of 18 races, finished 9th in points.

== Entrants ==
(partial list)

Team	Chassis	Engine	Drivers	Rounds
(United States) A.J. Foyt Enterprises	Coyote (1-11, 13, 16-17); Parnelli (12, 14-15, 18)	Foyt (1-11, 13, 16-17); Cosworth (12, 14-15, 18)	(United States) A.J. Foyt	All
(United States) All American Racers	Lightning (1-4); Eagle (5-13, 16-18)	Cosworth	(United States) Bobby Unser	1-13, 16-18
(United States) Chaparral Racing	Chapparal (1-2, 6-18); Lola (3, 5)	Cosworth	(United States) Al Unser	1-3, 5-18
(United States) Bob Fletcher	Lightning	Offenhauser	(United States) Pancho Carter	5-11, 13-15, 18
(United States) Interscope Racing	Parnelli	Cosworth	(United States) Danny Ongais	All
(United States) Jerry O'Connell Racing	McLaren (1-14, 16-18); Lightning (15)	Cosworth	(United States) Wally Dallenbach	1-7, 9, 12-14
(United States) Leader Card Racing	Eagle (1-4); Watson (5-18)	Offenhauser	(United States) Tom Bagley	All
(United States) Lindsey Hopkins Racing	Lightning	Offenhauser	(United States) Johnny Parsons	1-15, 18
(United Kingdom) McLaren	McLaren	Cosworth	(United States) Johnny Rutherford	All
(United States) Patrick Racing	Wildcat	DGS	(United States) Gordon Johncock	All
(United States) Patrick Racing	Wildcat	DGS (1-13, 15, 18); Offenhauser (14, 16-17)	(United States) Steve Krisiloff	All
(United States) Team Penske	Penske	Cosworth	(United States) Tom Sneva	All
(United States) Team Penske	Penske	Cosworth	(United States) Mario Andretti	2-5, 7, 13-15, 18
(United States) Team Penske	Penske	Cosworth	(United States) Rick Mears	1, 5-7, 9-13, 16-17

== Schedule ==
Icon	Legend
O	Oval/Speedway
R	Road course

Rnd	Date	Name	Circuit	Location
1	March 18	(United States) Jimmy Bryan 150	O Phoenix International Raceway	Avondale, Arizona
2	March 26	(United States) Datsun Twin 200	O Ontario Motor Speedway	Ontario, California
3	April 15	(United States) Coors 200	O Texas World Speedway	College Station, Texas
4	April 23	(United States) Gabriel 200	O Trenton International Speedway	Trenton, New Jersey
5	May 28	(United States) International 500 Mile Sweepstakes	O Indianapolis Motor Speedway	Speedway, Indiana
6	June 11	(Canada) Molson Diamond Indy	R Mosport Park	Bowmanville, Ontario
7	June 18	(United States) Rex Mays Classic	O Wisconsin State Fair Park Speedway	West Allis, Wisconsin
8	June 25	(United States) Schaefer 500	O Pocono International Raceway	Long Pond, Pennsylvania
9	July 16	(United States) Norton Twin 200	O Michigan International Speedway	Brooklyn, Michigan
10	July 23	(United States) Gould Twin Dixie	O Atlanta International Raceway	Hampton, Georgia
11	August 6	(United States) Texas Grand Prix	O Texas World Speedway	College Station, Texas
12	August 20	(United States) Tony Bettenhausen 200	O Wisconsin State Fair Park Speedway	West Allis, Wisconsin
13	September 3	(United States) California 500	O Ontario Motor Speedway	Ontario, California
14	September 16	(United States) Gould Grand Prix	O Michigan International Speedway	Brooklyn, Michigan
15	September 23	(United States) Machinist Union 150	O Trenton International Speedway	Trenton, New Jersey
16	October 1	(United Kingdom) Daily Express Indy Silverstone	R Silverstone Circuit	Silverstone, England
17	October 7	(United Kingdom) Daily Mail Indy Trophy	R Brands Hatch (Indy Circuit)	Fawkham, England
18	October 28	(United States) Miller High Life Bobby Ball Memorial 150	O Phoenix International Raceway	Avondale, Arizona

== Results ==
Rd.	Race	Pole position	Most laps led	Race winner			
Rd.	Race	Pole position	Most laps led	Driver	Team	Chassis	Engine
1	Phoenix 1	(United States) Danny Ongais	(United States) Gordon Johncock	(United States) Gordon Johncock	Patrick Racing	Wildcat Mk.II	DGS
2	Ontario 200	(United States) Tom Sneva	(United States) Danny Ongais	(United States) Danny Ongais	Interscope Racing	Parnelli VPJ6B	Cosworth
3	Texas World 200	(United States) Danny Ongais	(United States) Danny Ongais	(United States) Danny Ongais	Interscope Racing	Parnelli VPJ6B	Cosworth
4	Trenton 200	(United States) Tom Sneva	(United States) Gordon Johncock	(United States) Gordon Johncock	Patrick Racing	Wildcat Mk.II	DGS
5	Indianapolis 500	(United States) Tom Sneva	(United States) Al Unser	(United States) Al Unser	Chaparral Racing	Lola T500	Cosworth
6	Mosport	(United States) Danny Ongais	(United States) Danny Ongais	(United States) Danny Ongais	Interscope Racing	Parnelli VPJ6B	Cosworth
7	Milwaukee 1	(United States) Danny Ongais	(United States) Danny Ongais	(United States) Rick Mears	Penske Racing	Penske PC-6	Cosworth
8	Pocono	(United States) Danny Ongais	(United States) Al Unser	(United States) Al Unser	Chaparral Racing	Lola T500	Cosworth
9	Michigan 200	(United States) Tom Sneva	(United States) Johnny Rutherford	(United States) Johnny Rutherford	Team McLaren	McLaren M24	Cosworth
10	Atlanta	(United States) Tom Sneva	(United States) Rick Mears	(United States) Rick Mears	Penske Racing	Penske PC-6	Cosworth
11	Texas World GP	(United States) Tom Sneva	(United States) A. J. Foyt	(United States) A. J. Foyt	Gilmore Racing	Coyote IV	Foyt
12	Milwaukee 2	(United States) Danny Ongais	(United States) Danny Ongais	(United States) Danny Ongais	Interscope Racing	Parnelli VPJ6B	Cosworth
13	California 500	(United States) Tom Sneva	(United States) Johnny Rutherford	(United States) Al Unser	Chaparral Racing	Lola T500	Cosworth
14	Michigan GP	(United States) Johnny Rutherford	(United States) Johnny Rutherford	(United States) Danny Ongais	Interscope Racing	Parnelli VPJ6B	Cosworth
15	Trenton 150	(United States) A. J. Foyt	(United States) Danny Ongais	(United States) Mario Andretti	Penske Racing	Penske PC-6	Cosworth
16	Silverstone	(United States) Danny Ongais	(United States) Al Unser	(United States) A. J. Foyt	Gilmore Racing	Coyote IV	Foyt
17	Brands Hatch	(United States) Al Unser	(United States) Danny Ongais	(United States) Rick Mears	Penske Racing	Penske PC-6	Cosworth
18	Phoenix 2	(United States) Danny Ongais	(United States) Danny Ongais	(United States) Johnny Rutherford	Team McLaren	McLaren M24	Cosworth

== Final points standings ==
Note: Janet Guthrie is not eligible for points due to her FIA license.

Pos	Driver	PHX1 (United States)	ONT1 (United States)	TWS1 (United States)	TRE1 (United States)	INDY (United States)	MOS (Canada)	MIL1 (United States)	POC (United States)	MIS1 (United States)	ATL (United States)	TWS2 (United States)	MIL2 (United States)	ONT2 (United States)	MIS2 (United States)	TRE2 (United States)	SIL (United Kingdom)	BRH (United Kingdom)	PHX2 (United States)	Pts
1	(United States) Tom Sneva	22	**2**	2	**3**	**2**	4	15	3	**2**	**8**	**5**	15	**23**	2	3	3	2	16	4153
2	(United States) Al Unser	10	3	Wth		1*	12	8	1*	17	14	17	5	1	17	4	10*	**15**	5	4031
3	(United States) Gordon Johncock	1*	19	3	1*	3	Wth	22	14	19	7	7	3	3	3	14	4	11	3	3548
4	(United States) Johnny Rutherford	16	13	19	10	13	8	2	2	1*	2	2	8	11*	**13***	11	5	3	1	3067
5	(United States) A. J. Foyt	3	4	17	2	7	16	19	8	16	4	1*	4	28	5	**19**	1	4	2	3024
6	(United States) Wally Dallenbach	14	9	4	11	5	11	3	4	3	9	4	7	10	11	6	14	5	6	2966
7	(United States) Steve Krisiloff	2	14	8	5	4	3	4	32	14	5	3	6	7	15	5	6	DNS	8	2874
8	(United States) Danny Ongais	**12**	1*	**1***	4	18	**1***	**16***	**19**	6	21	DNS	**1***	12	1	15*	**15**	9*	**4***	2662
9	(United States) Rick Mears	5	Wth			23	2	1		22	1*	9	2	9			2	1		2171
10	(United States) Pancho Carter					24	15	21	10	Wth	11	11		2	18	7			9	1206
11	(United States) Tom Bagley RY	8	17	10	12	27	17	7	26	12	6	16	DNQ	4	6	12	13	14	14	1188
12	(United States) Bobby Unser	18	16	13	20	6	19	17	20	5	3	8	20	13			8	13	11	1122
13	(United States) Larry Dickson	17	5	14		22	5	5	5	11		Wth								1121
14	(United States) Johnny Parsons	DNS	18	11	17	10	9	9	22	4	20	18	19	15	7	2			Wth	978
15	(United States) George Snider					8			6	15		DNS		27			11	8	20	766
16	(United States) Tom Bigelow	15	7	12	8	21	14	6	15	8			10		4				18	764
17	(United States) Mario Andretti		15	5	13	12			23						20	1			7	681
18	(United States) Dick Simon	4	6			19		18	30	13	18	6	21	14		DNQ	12	7	22	670
19	(United States) Jim McElreath			6	7	20			25	7	13	12	12	20	9	Wth			12	573
20	(United States) Salt Walther	13	11	7	15	28	7	11	13	18				29			7	6	Wth	562
21	(Canada) Cliff Hucul	7				33	10		17	Wth		21	9	8		13				519
22	(United States) Lee Kunzman					DNQ			33		DNQ		18	5						513
23	(United States) Sheldon Kinser	6	8	15	14	32			12	Wth	17	19	11	17	8	10			19	495
24	(United States) Mike Mosley					17	DNS	14	7	Wth		13	DNQ	16		8			10	483
25	(United States) Roger Mears R													6					Wth	400
26	(United States) Bobby Olivero	9	10	9	6	Wth														360
27	(United States) Al Loquasto					DNQ	13	12	9	10	19		13	19						321
28	(United States) Joe Saldana					15			21	9	10	10	DNQ		10	Wth	16	10		314
29	(United States) Gary Bettenhausen	21	12		19	16	6	DNQ	29				22			9			21	294
30	(United States) Spike Gehlhausen	20	23	16	18	29	Wth	13	31	20	22	14	16	21	16	17	9	12	17	188
31	(United States) Larry Cannon					DNQ		10	11	Wth		15	17	22	19	DNQ			Wth	184
32	(United States) Larry Rice R	Wth	Wth		9	11			Wth	Wth										180
33	(United States) Jerry Karl	11	21	21	22	14			18					DNS		20				104
34	(United States) Jerry Sneva					31			16	DNQ	16			25	14	18			Wth	62
35	(United States) Roger McCluskey	19	20	20	21	25								24					13	61
36	(United States) Phil Threshie R					30	18	20	24	21	Wth			30						45
37	(United States) Todd Gibson										15		14			16			15	34
38	(Australia) Vern Schuppan			18	16							20								26
39	(United States) Bob Harkey		22			DNQ								18						26
40	(United States) Bill Vukovich II					DNQ			28					26						20
41	(Canada) Eldon Rasmussen					DNQ				Wth					12	DNQ				15
42	(United States) Roger Rager					DNQ		DNQ	Wth	DNQ	12									15
43	(United States) John Mahler					26														10
44	(United States) Bubby Jones R					DNQ			27											10
45	(United States) Chuck Gurney	DNQ	24																	6
-	(United States) Janet Guthrie					9														0
-	(United States) Gary Irvin R		Wth			DNQ			Wth											0
-	(United States) Tom Gloy R												Wth			Wth			DNQ	0
-	(United States) Jim Hurtubise					DNQ														0
-	(United States) Bill Puterbaugh					DNQ														0
-	(United States) John Martin					DNQ														0
-	(New Zealand) Graham McRae R					DNQ														0
-	(Canada) Frank Weiss																		DNQ	0
-	(United States) Ed Finley							Wth												0
-	(United States) Mike Hiss					QL														0
Pos	Driver	PHX1 (United States)	ONT1 (United States)	TWS1 (United States)	TRE1 (United States)	INDY (United States)	MOS (Canada)	MIL1 (United States)	POC (United States)	MIS1 (United States)	ATL (United States)	TWS2 (United States)	MIL2 (United States)	ONT2 (United States)	MIS2 (United States)	TRE2 (United States)	SIL (United Kingdom)	BRH (United Kingdom)	PHX2 (United States)	Pts

Color	Result
Gold	Winner
Silver	2nd place
Bronze	3rd place
Green	4th & 5th place
Light Blue	6th-10th place
Dark Blue	Finished (Outside Top 10)
Purple	Did not finish (Ret)
Red	Did not qualify (DNQ)
Brown	Withdrawn (Wth)
Black	Disqualified (DSQ)
White	Did not start (DNS)
Blank	Did not participate (DNP)
Blank	Not competing

**In-line notation**
**Bold**	Pole position
Italics	Ran fastest race lap
*	Led most race laps
RY Rookie of the Year
R Rookie

== See also ==
- 1978 Indianapolis 500
