= Richard W. Boone =

American philanthropist

Richard "Dick" Wolf Boone (March 29, 1927 – February 26, 2014) was an American philanthropist who worked through both the government and social organizations to improve conditions for the poor. He had worked under the Kennedy administration in the Office of Economic Opportunity until 1965, where he had been one of the leading figures in the War on Poverty. In 1965 Boone left the government, choosing instead to continue his efforts through independent charitable organizations. Some of Boone's most notable work was done as the director of the Field Foundation, in which he initiated many new programs to help those in poverty. He died February 26, 2014, in Santa Barbara, California, reportedly as a result of non-Hodgkin's lymphoma and Parkinson's disease.

== Early life and education ==
Richard Boone was born March 29, 1927, in Louisville, Kentucky. The city was racially segregated, and he often accompanied his father, a doctor, in many house calls during the Great Depression. This taught Boone from a young age about social injustice and poverty.

Boone entered the University of Chicago at 16, before he had even finished high school, to study criminology. However, his education was interrupted by the onset of the World War II. Boone served in the United States Navy in the Pacific, and returned to the University of Chicago after the end of the war to complete his education. He received a bachelor's degree in philosophy 1948 and a master's in 1959. While at the University of Chicago, Boone also met several people who would influence and work with him, including: Robert Hutchins, the president of the University, Saul Alinsky, a community organizer who advised Boone on including the poor in planning the social programs designed to help them, and Robert F. Kennedy, who would share many of Boone's opinions on social advancement and later create the Office of Economic Opportunity with him as a member.

== Professional life ==
=== Early work in government offices (until 1965) ===
After College, Boone first worked in the Cook County Sheriff's Office where he worked to prevent juvenile delinquency. His efforts caught the attention of Attorney General Robert F. Kennedy, who brought him to the Department of Justice. At the department, Boone continued working with the youth by starting the Appalachian Volunteers, a college service corps that focused on the issues of the poor. In Lyndon B. Johnson's Great Society, he would work with director Sargent Shriver in the War on Poverty. He believed in a concept he referred to as "maximum feasible participation of the poor", which encouraged poor people to organize and carry out many of the programs aimed at helping them. Thus, he pioneered a grassroots approach to helping the poor rather than the more common top-down methods used by the bureaucracy at the time. He used an approach termed the "three legged stool", in which control over funds and activities was split among the public sector, private nonprofit sector, and representatives of the areas to be served rather than just from the government and bureaucracy itself. In the Office, he also started numerous programs aimed at helping the poor such as Headstart and Upward Bound.

=== 1965 onward: work in the private sector ===
In 1965, Boone stopped working directly in the government and instead chose to fight against poverty from the private sector. Boone believed that communities in poverty struggled not only from poor economic conditions, but also from a lack of organization and knowledge of how to get what they need from the bureaucracy. He believed that the community has to unite in order to receive what they need from social workers, who he looked down upon. Thus, he started a private organization called the Citizens' Crusade Against Poverty, which was meant to monitor anti-poverty programs from the outside. This organization's work later to the expansion of the Food Stamp Program (the program is now called the Supplemental Nutrition Assistance Program). Boone also did major work in organizing the Citizen's Board of Inquiry into Hunger and Malnutrition in the United States, which served to report of numerous nutrition problems that had long been ignored. Furthermore, when the federal government attempted to cut funding for Mississippi's Headstart program because it helped blacks to participate in poverty programs, he countered with a campaign of his own.

Boone's focus on American poverty led to the Federal Bureau of Investigation under J. Edgar Hoover investigating him for being un-American, but media attention eventually forced the case closed.

In 1968, Boone continued his work with young Americans by organizing the Youth Project while he was the vice-president of the Center for Community Change. This was the first national program that focused on furthering youth development programs in local communities.

In 1970, Boone became the director of Robert F. Kennedy Memorial Foundation. He tried to find relatively young people and work on civil rights and liberties. In 1977 he moved to New York to become the Director of the Field Foundation, which offered grants and assistance to non-profit organizations promoting civil rights. Boone launched initiatives like US Resettlement of IndoChina refugees, advanced voter registration among poor, and in 1981 became a major funder of the Center on Budget and Policy Priorities, a Washington, D.C.–based think tank that pursues fiscal policies and improvements in social programs to protect and better serve low-income Americans. Boone stayed the director of the Foundation until it shut down in 1989.

== Personal life ==
Richard W. Boone is survived by his wife Chloris Robinson Boone of Santa Barbara. He has a daughter named Laurel Boone and four sons named: Steven, Wade, Brent, and Jed Boone. He also has six grandchildren.
