= Marshall Field IV =

American newspaperman

- Born: June 15, 1916; New York City, US
- Died: September 18, 1965 (aged 49); Chicago, Illinois, US
- Resting place: Graceland Cemetery; Chicago, Illinois
- Education: Harvard University; University of Virginia School of Law
- Spouses: Joanne Bass (m. 1938–1947) Katherine Fanning (m. 1950–1963) Julia Lynne Templeton (m. 1964–1965)
- Children: 6, including Ted
- Parent(s): Evelyn Marshall Field; Marshall Field III
- Relatives: Charles Henry Marshall (grandfather); Robert P. Bass (father-in-law); Perkins Bass (brother-in-law)

Marshall Field IV (June 15, 1916 – September 18, 1965) was the owner of the Chicago Daily News from 1956 to 1965.

== Early life and education ==
Marshall Field IV was born in New York City on June 15, 1916, to Evelyn (née Marshall) Field and Marshall Field III. Among his siblings was Barbara Field, who also married three times (to Anthony Addison Bliss, Robert Kenneth Boggs, and George Peter Joseph Benziger, grandson of James Joseph Brown). Through his father's second marriage to Ruth Pruyn (the first wife of Ogden Phipps), he was the elder half-brother to Fiona Field, who married Jean Eugene Paul Kay.

His maternal grandfather was merchant Charles Henry Marshall Jr. (who served as Commissioner of Docks and Ferries of the City of New York) and his paternal grandfather was Marshall Field Jr., the son of Marshall Field, the founder of Marshall Field and Company, the Chicago-based department stores. His parents divorced and his mother remarried to Diego Suarez. His maternal uncle, Charles Henry Marshall III, was married to Brooke (née Russell) Kuser, the daughter of John H. Russell Jr. (16th commandant of the Marine Corps). After his uncle's death, Brooke remarried to Vincent Astor in 1953.

He was educated at Harvard University, and the University of Virginia School of Law.

== Career ==
Field was commissioned as an ensign in the United States Navy in June 1942. He served as a gunnery officer aboard the aircraft carrier USS Enterprise in a number of engagements in the Pacific and was wounded during the Battle of the Santa Cruz Islands. His conduct in the engagement won him the Silver Star, the Purple Heart, and the Presidential Unit Citation. He was discharged with the rank of Lt. Commander in 1944.

He learned the newspaper trade as a reporter for the Chicago Sun, owned by his father, from 1946 to 1948. He had a nervous breakdown and was briefly institutionalized following his father's death in 1956, then took up the reins as the owner of the Chicago Sun-Times and Field Enterprises. He also owned Parade magazine from 1956 to 1958 and purchased the Chicago Daily News in 1959.

== Personal life ==
In 1938, Field was married to Joanne Bass (1915–2000), daughter of former New Hampshire Governor Robert P. Bass, in East Walpole, Massachusetts. Joanne was a graduate of the Ethel Walker School. The couple divorced in 1947 after having two children together:

- Marshall Field V (b. 1941), who married Joan Best in 1964, and became the father of Marshall Field VI.
- Joanne Field Langdon.

His second marriage, which lasted from 1950 to 1963, was to Katherine Woodruff (later Fanning). She was a journalist who edited and published the Anchorage Daily News. They married in Joliet, Illinois, and before their divorce, they were the parents of three children:

- Frederick "Ted" Field (b. 1953), an entrepreneur and film producer.
- Katherine Field Stephen
- Barbara Field.

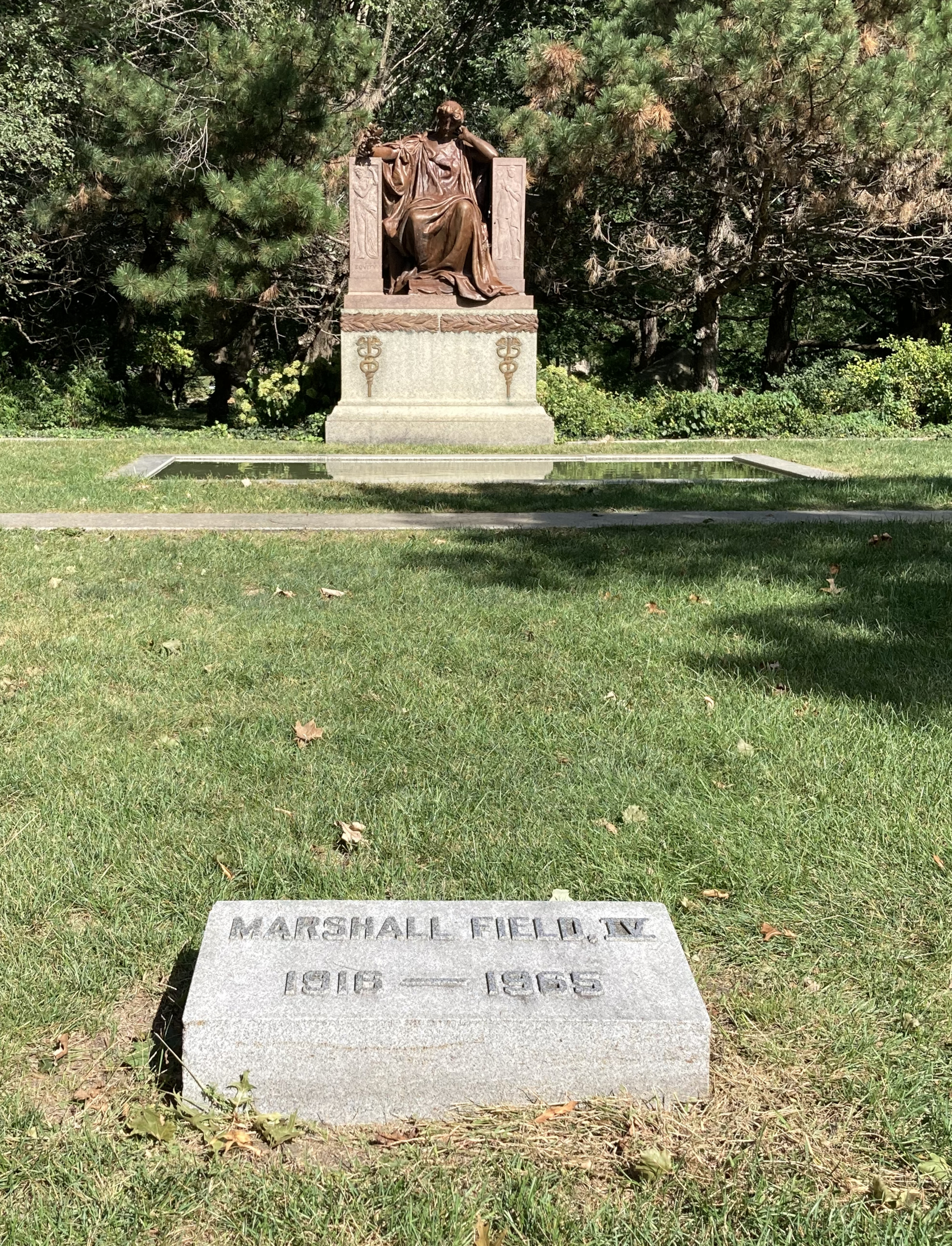
Field's grave at Graceland Cemetery

His third marriage, to Julia Lynne Templeton, who previously worked in public relations, was in 1964, and ended with his death the following year. The couple had one child:

- Corinne Field (b. 1965).

Marshall Field IV died at his home in Chicago on September 18, 1965. While it was rumored that he had died of an accidental overdose, the Cook County Coroner's office ruled his death as result of natural causes. His estate was valued at $25,500,000.

He was buried at Graceland Cemetery in Chicago.

=== Legacy ===
There are two professorships at the University of Chicago named after him, the Marshall Field IV Professor in Psychology and the Marshall Field IV Professor in Urban Education.
