= Danny Ongais =

American racing driver (1942–2022)

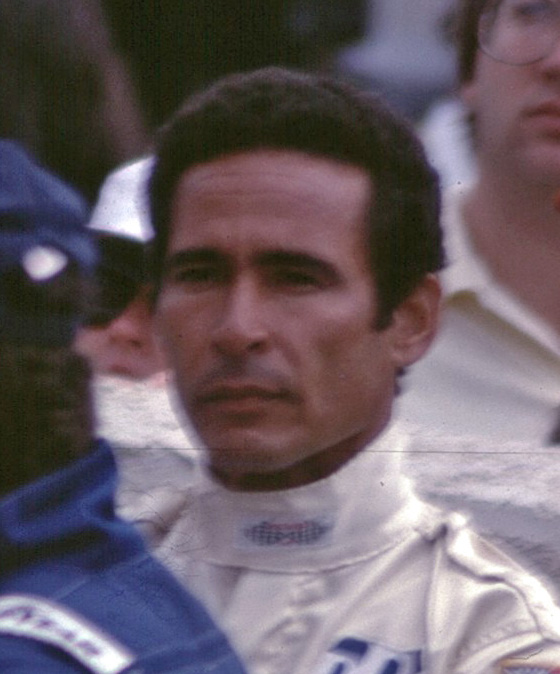
- Ongais at the 1984 Pocono 500
- Nationality: (United States) American
- Born: Ezekiel Ongais; May 21, 1942 (Note: Ongais' year of birth is disputed. Refer to the "Disputed birth year" section) Kahului, Hawaii, U.S.
- Died: February 26, 2022 (aged 79) Anaheim, California, U.S.

Awards
- Motorsports Hall of Fame of America (2000)

Champ Car career
- 86 races run over 14 years
- Years active: 1968, 1971, 1976-1987
- Best finish: 6th – 1979
- First race: 1976 California 500 (Ontario)
- Last race: 1987 Nissan Indy Challenge (Miami)
- First win: 1977 Norton 200 (Michigan)
- Last win: 1978 Gould Grand Prix (Michigan)
Wins	Podiums	Poles
6	8	11

IndyCar Series career
- 2 races run over 3 years
- Best finish: 26th – 1996
- First race: 1996 Indianapolis 500 (Indianapolis)
- Last race: 1997 Indy 200 at Walt Disney World (Orlando)
Wins	Podiums	Poles
0	0	0

Formula One World Championship career
- Active years: 1977 – 1978
- Team(s): Ensign, non-works Penske, Shadow
- Entries: 6 (4 starts)
- Championships: 0
- Wins: 0
- Podiums: 0
- Career points: 0
- Pole positions: 0
- Fastest laps: 0
- First entry: 1977 United States Grand Prix
- Last entry: 1978 Dutch Grand Prix

Ezekiel "Danny" Ongais (May 21, 1942 – February 26, 2022) was an American racing driver.

Ongais was the only Hawaiian born driver to compete in the Indianapolis 500. He competed professionally in motorcycle, sports car, CART, IndyCar, Formula One, and drag racing. A fearless figure on the racing circuit, Ongais was nicknamed "On-the-Gas" and "The Flyin' Hawaiian." He is the only driver to have won the NHRA U.S. Nationals and the 24 Hours of Daytona.

In the 1960s, Ongais won multiple drag racing championships and was named one of the National Hot Rod Association’s Top 50 Drivers for 1951-2000. In the 1970s he moved to competing in sports cars and Indy cars, winning races in both types, including the 24 Hours of Daytona in 1979 and several Indy car races in 1977 and 1978. He also raced in Formula One from 1977–78, in six Grands Prix, recording a best result of seventh.

Ongais was known as a fast and daring driver, but he experienced multiple crashes in his career, some resulting in injury. At the 1981 Indianapolis 500, he was involved in a near-fatal accident that caused him to miss almost a year of racing.

In 1996, at the age of 54, after nine years away from racing, Ongais served as the substitute driver in the Indianapolis 500 for Scott Brayton, who had died in a crash before the race. Starting last, Ongais finished seventh in what was his final 500.

Ongais was inducted into the Motorsports Hall of Fame of America in 2000 and the Hawaii Sports Hall of Fame in 2001.

== Early life and career ==
Almost every source references Ongais having been born in Kahului, Hawaii, on May 21, 1942 of Puerto Rican immigrant grandparents, although the documentary "On the Gas" claims that he was born in 1939 citing the 1940 US Census as a reference. When he was aged fourteen, he tested out motorbike racing with some success. In the late 1950s, Ongais enlisted in the United States Army as a paratrooper stationed in Europe. He was later discharged and returned to Hawaii for motor racing. Ongais became the Hawaiian motorcycle champion in 1960 and was in the top three positions in the expert class from 1960 to 1962.

In the early 1960s, Ongais started competing in drag racing. He won the American Hot Rod Association AA Gas Dragster Championship in 1963 and 1964, and in the National Hot Rod Association AA Dragster championship title in 1965. He defeated Don Prudhomme at the 1966 HHRA Nationals Top Fuel semifinals. In 1969, he won the NHRA Spring Nationals and NHRA U.S. Nationals in the Funny Car class driving a Ford Mustang for Mickey Thompson.

== 1970s ==
Ongais moved into circuit racing in the 1970s, working his way up the ranks in American racing through SCCA road racing with the help of Ted Field. Eventually progressing through regional series and Formula 5000, Ongais and Field moved to USAC and Indy cars in 1976 under the banner of Interscope Racing. His first Indy car race was the 1976 California 500 at Ontario Motor Speedway, where he finished 28th after a crash.

In 1977, Ongais ran his first full season in Indy cars. He had a seventh at Ontario and fifth at Phoenix and then he won his first Indy car race at Michigan International Speedway. He qualified well over the season, earning three poles, and he finished twelfth in the standings.

That year, Ongais also ventured into Formula One with the Interscope team, entering the U.S. and Canadian Grands Prix at the end of the season in a year-old Penske PC4. He crashed out on a wet track at Watkins Glen after moving up early but managed a seventh place in Canada in what would be his best finish in F1.

Ongais' most successful year in Indy car racing came in 1978. Ongais won five races: at Ontario, Texas World, Mosport, the Milwaukee, and again at Michigan. He also won eight poles in qualifying. Ongais started in the middle of the front row at the 1978 Indianapolis 500, and dominated the early stages of the race. After leading 71 laps, he dropped out with a blown engine while running in second position on lap 145.

The 1978 victory at Michigan would turn out to be the final Indy car victory of Ongais' career. Although Ongais won more Indy car races than any other driver that season, a combination of mechanical problems and low finishes in other races meant he would only finish eighth in the 1978 USAC Championship. Still, those five wins—three on the large superspeedways at Ontario, Texas, and Michigan, one at the short Milwaukee Mile oval, and one road race at Mosport—demonstrated Ongais' versatility as a driver.

In 1978, Ongais also made one final attempt at F1. He entered the season with the Ensign team, in a year-old N177 chassis, and retired in Argentina and Brazil with brake problems. Interscope then bought a new Shadow chassis for him to race but he was unable to qualify at Long Beach and also in the Netherlands later in the season.

Throughout the decade, and indeed throughout the remainder of his driving career, Ongais and Field continued driving sports cars successfully, mainly in IMSA Camel GT competition. The highlight of their sports car endeavours during this time was a victory in the 1979 24 Hours of Daytona, with Ongais and Field sharing their Interscope Porsche 935 with Hurley Haywood.

== CART career ==
Ongais made his CART debut during the 1979 season driving the No. 25 Panasonic/Interscope Racing Parnelli 6C-Cosworth DFX. He first raced at the Arizona Republic/Jimmy Bryan 150 at Phoenix International Raceway where he qualified fourth and led for several laps only to drop out after 128 laps due to engine problems. He then competed at the Gould Twin Dixie 125 however bad luck hit Ongais in both races. At the Indianapolis 500, Ongais crashed in practice and this put Ongais in jeopardy of not being able to compete. Ongais qualified 27th and finished fourth. As the season progressed the Parnelli 6C (which was already a two-year-old car) started to struggle due to its age. Ongais scored another fourth-place finish at the Kent Oil 150 at Watkins Glen International and finished in sixth place in points.

For the 1980 season, Interscope was intending to use their own chassis with a Porsche V6 engine. The car was disallowed and Interscope brought out their Parnelli 6C-Cosworth DFX. At his first race of the season, the Indianapolis 500, Ongais started sixteenth and finished seventh. Ongais endured a tough season highlighted by a third place finish at Watkins Glen. Ongais also made a single start for AMI Racing driving the No. 43 Armstrong Mould Orbiter 80C-Cosworth DFX at the Michigan 400 at Michigan International Speedway, finishing 11th. Ongais ended the season in 15th place in points.

In 1981 at the Indianapolis 500, Ongais was involved in a very serious accident on lap 63. Ongais came into the pits on lap 63 as the leader of the race, but problems during the stop caused it to drag on for a disastrous 46 seconds. After finally leaving the pits, Ongais approached a slower car at the end of the backstretch. He made a late pass going into the third turn. Carrying too much speed out of the turn, the car drifted out into the grey and the back end began to slide. Ongais tried to correct the slide by turning right, and the car hooked to the right and crashed nearly head-on into the wall. He was knocked unconscious by the heavy impact. Officials had to cut open the car to help Ongais out. He was transported by an ambulance to a nearby hospital in a critical condition. By the time the broadcasting of the race ended at 11:30 PM, Ongais's condition had improved and his condition was updated to stable. He suffered a concussion, compound fractures in both legs, a broken arm and a six-inch tear in his diaphragm. He missed the rest of the CART year to recover in rehabilitation.

In 1982, Ongais ran on only one Indy car race, the Indianapolis 500 (which was still sanctioned by USAC). He piloted a new Interscope IP-1 chassis, qualifying ninth and leading several laps before crashing out on lap 62 when running fifth. For the rest of the year, he raced only sports cars.

Ongais next drove in CART during the 1983 CART/PPG World Series season, first appearing at the 1983 Indianapolis 500. He initially drove the No. 65 Interscope Racing March 83C-Chevrolet V6, however, that car was replaced with the No. 25 March 83C-Cosworth DFX. Ongais started in 21st place and retired with mechanical problems. For the next seven races, Ongais replaced an injured Johnny Rutherford at Patrick Racing, who had been driving the No. 40 Sea Ray Boats Wildcat Mk 9-Cosworth DFX. Later in the season, Interscope Racing set up a partnership between themselves and Patrick Racing giving Patrick March 83C-Cosworth DFXs. Ongais scored a best finish of fifth place at the Escort Warning Radars 200 at Mid-Ohio Sports Car Course. He finished the season in 20th place in points.

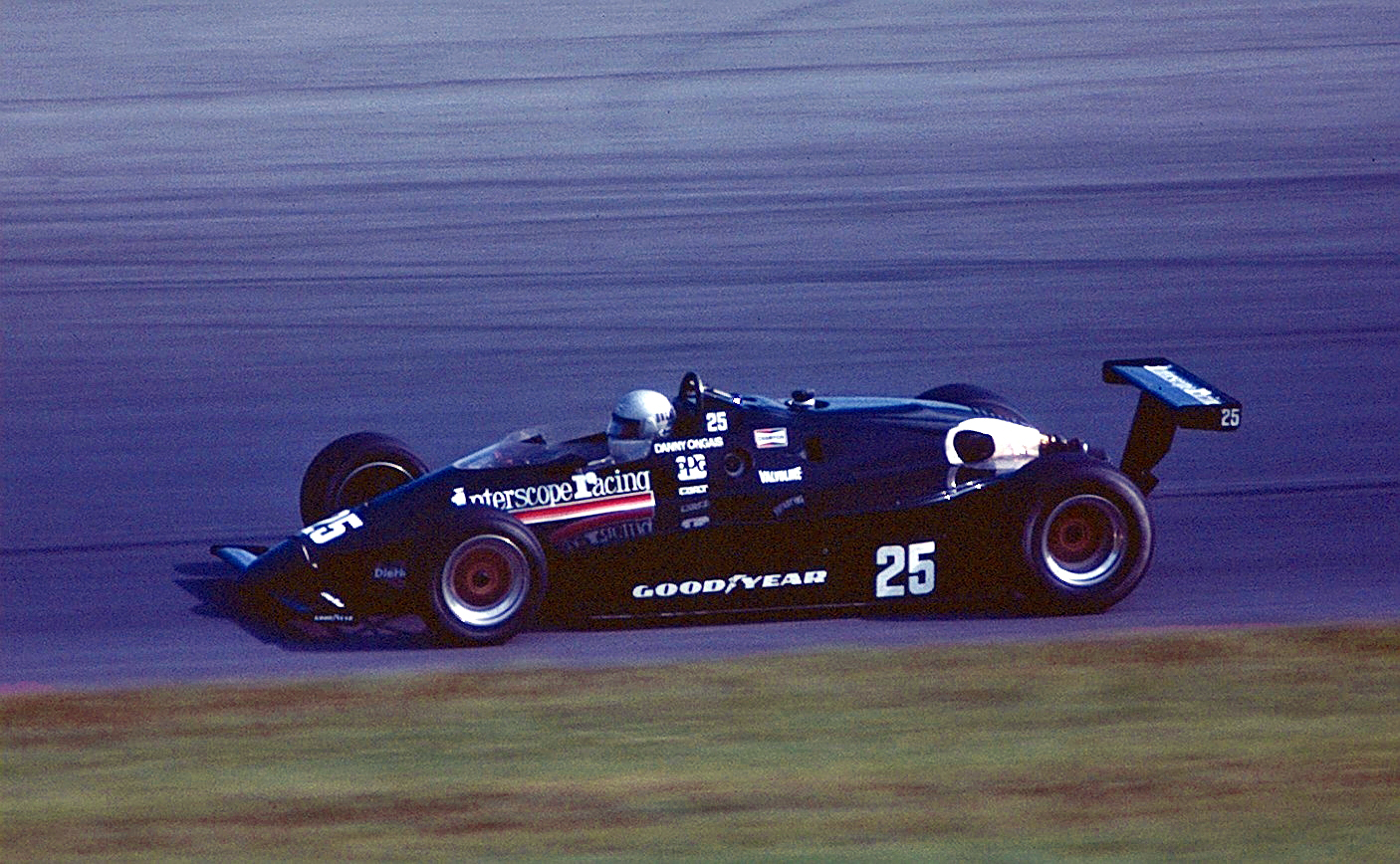
1984 Champ Car

For the 1984 season, Ongais took over as owner of Interscope Racing fielding the No. 25 Interscope Racing March 84C-Cosworth DFX. Ongais finished in third place at the Detroit News Grand Prix at Michigan International Speedway. He also finished in tenth place in points.

For the 1985 season, Ongais scored a best finish of sixth at the Beatrice Indy Challenge at Tamiami Park and finished in 24th place in points. Ongais also survived a spectacular barrel roll at the Michigan 500 at Michigan International Speedway when he ran into the slower car of Phil Krueger on the backstretch.

For the 1986 season, Ongais only ran the 1986 Indianapolis 500 for Interscope Racing. Fielding the No. 25 GM Goodwrench/Panavision March 86C-Buick V6, Ongais dropped out with a mechanical failure.

For the 1987 season, Interscope Racing teamed up with Team Penske getting Ongais in the No. 25 Panavision Penske PC-16-Ilmor-Chevrolet Indy V8 for the Indianapolis 500, however Ongais crashed in practice and suffered a concussion. The car went to Al Unser Sr who went on to win a record-tying fourth Indianapolis 500. Ongais later attempted to race at the Marlboro 500 at Michigan International Speedway, the Nissan Indy Challenge at Tamiami Park, and the Bosch Spark Plug Grand Prix at Nazareth Speedway. He would retire at Michigan and Miami and fail to qualify at Nazareth.

== IndyCar ==
After a nine-year hiatus from racing, Ongais was asked by John Menard to fill in for Scott Brayton who was killed during Friday Practice for the 1996 Indianapolis 500. Under qualifying rules he had to start 33rd. He was the oldest driver to compete in that field, at age 54. Ongais finished seventh, having the best car early in the race. He ran his last Indy Car race the next year, in the Indy 200 at Walt Disney World, with Chitwood Motorsports, where he finished thirteenth. In 1998, he attempted to qualify for the Indianapolis 500 with Team Pelfrey but was unable to do so when he suffered a concussion after a crash.

== Awards ==
- Ongais was inducted in the Motorsports Hall of Fame of America in 2000.
- On the National Hot Rod Association Top 50 Drivers, 1951-2000, Ongais was ranked 39th.
- Ongais was inducted into the Hawaii Sports Hall of Fame in 2001.

== Personal life ==
Ongais was notoriously reclusive and a private man, rarely giving interviews and revealing little or no details of his life outside of racing. Roger Penske, while employing Ongais for the 1987 Indy 500, was unable to get the racer to speak to the press, and said of him - "His whole heart is in racing, that's his life" Jim Chapman, race director at Interscope Racing stated "Nobody really knew much about him — where he lived, his family, stuff like that". Chapman did state that well into their relationship he learned Ongais was married and had a son.

Ongais died from congestive heart failure in Anaheim Hills, California, on February 26, 2022, at the age of 79. His death was announced by the Indianapolis Motor Speedway two days later. He was survived by his long time partner Patricia Soldano, as well as his three children and five grandchildren. His former Indy car competitors remembered him well after his passing, with Mario Andretti calling him “that quiet lion.”

== Disputed birth year ==
Throughout his career, Ongais information listed his birth in 1942. However, his birth was likely in either 1938 or 1939. In a May 1978 interview with the Honolulu Star-Bulletin, Dan Ongais Sr. said that his son was preparing to turn 39 instead of 36. The 1940 United States census, taken in April 1940, list the younger Ongais as being one year-old by that point in 1940. The 1950 census lists him as 11 years-old in April 1950.

A 1979 profile in Sport Magazine referenced the age discrepancy, stating "If he began racing motorcycles after his hitch in the Army, as his father states, then Ongais would have been inducted into the Army at 14. But taking liberties with one's age is common among race drivers."

== Racing record ==
=== Complete Formula One results ===
(key)

Year	Entrant	Chassis	Engine	1	2	3	4	5	6	7	8	9	10	11	12	13	14	15	16	17	WDC	Points
1977	Interscope Racing	Penske PC4	Cosworth V8	ARG	BRA	RSA	USW	ESP	MON	BEL	SWE	FRA	GBR	GER	AUT	NED	ITA	USA; Ret	CAN; 7	JPN	NC	0
1978	Team Tissot Ensign	Ensign N177	Cosworth V8	ARG; Ret	BRA; Ret	RSA															NC	0
1978	Interscope Racing	Shadow DN9	Cosworth V8				USW; DNPQ	MON	BEL	ESP	SWE	FRA	GBR	GER	AUT	NED; DNPQ	ITA	USA	CAN		NC	0

=== American Open-Wheel racing results ===
(key) (Races in bold indicate pole position)

==== USAC ====
Year	Team	1	2	3	4	5	6	7	8	9	10	11	12	13	14	15	16	17	18	Rank	Points
1976	Interscope Racing	PHX	TRE	INDY	MIL	POC	MCH	TWS	TRE	MIL	ONT; 28	MCH	TWS	PHX						NC	-
1977	Interscope Racing	ONT; 7	PHX; 5	TWS; 13	TRE	INDY; 20	MIL; 17	POC; 23	MOS; 15	MCH; 1	**TWS**; 13	**MIL**; 21	ONT; 8	**MCH**; 17	PHX; 12					**12th**	**935**
1978	Interscope Racing	**PHX**; 12	ONT; 1	**TWS**; 1	TRE; 4	INDY; 18	**MOS**; 1	**MIL**; 16	**POC**; 19	MCH; 6	ATL; 21	TWS; DNS	**MIL**; 1	ONT; 12	MCH; 1	TRE; 15	**SIL**; 15	BRH; 9	**PHX**; 4	**8th**	**2662**
1979	Interscope Racing	ONT	TWS	INDY; 4	MIL	POC; 12	TWS	MIL												NC	-
1981-82	Interscope Racing	INDY; 27	POC	ILL	DUQ	ISF	INDY; 22													NC	-

==== PPG Indycar Series ====
(key) (Races in bold indicate pole position)

Year	Team	1	2	3	4	5	6	7	8	9	10	11	12	13	14	15	16	17	Rank	Points
1979	Interscope Racing	PHX; 15	ATL; 14	ATL; 6	INDY; 4	TRE; 7	TRE; 6	MCH; 18	MCH; 12	WGL; 4	TRE; 13	ONT; 6	MCH; DNS	ATL; 15	PHX; 17				6th	1473
1980	Interscope Racing	ONT	INDY; 7	MIL; 24	POC; 18	MOH; 21	MCH; 21	WGL; 3	MIL	ONT; 19	MCH; 11	MEX; 24	PHX						15th	601
1983	Interscope Racing	ATL	INDY; 21																20th	14
1983	Patrick Racing			MIL; 12	CLE; 28	MCH; 23	ROA; 18	POC; 24	RIV; 10	MOH; 5	MCH	CPL	LAG	PHX					20th	14
1984	Interscope Racing	LBH; DNQ	PHX; 5	INDY; 9	MIL; 10	POR; 11	MEA; 18	CLE; 28	MCH; 24	ROA	POC; 5	MOH	SAN; 23	MCH; 3	PHX; 5	LAG; 21	CPL; 17		10th	53
1985	Interscope Racing	LBH; DNQ	INDY; 17	MIL	POR	MEA	CLE	MCH; 20	ROA	POC; 22	MOH	SAN	MCH; 7	LAG	PHX; 14	MIA; 6			24th	14
1986	March Engineering	PHX	LBH	INDY; 23	MIL	POR	MEA	CLE	TOR	MCH	POC	MOH	SAN	MCH	ROA	LAG	PHX	MIA	NC	0
1987	Penske Racing	LBH	PHX	INDY; Wth^{1}	MIL	POR	MEA	CLE	TOR										42nd	0
1987	Interscope Racing									MCH; 17	POC	ROA	MOH	NAZ; DNQ	LAG	MIA; 27			42nd	0

^{1} Injured, replaced by Al Unser

==== Indy Racing League ====
Year	Team	1	2	3	4	5	6	7	8	9	10	11	Rank	Points	Ref
1996	Team Menard	WDW	PHX	INDY; 7									**29th**	**28**	
1996-1997	Chitwood Motorsports	NHM	LVS	WDW; 13	PHX	INDY	TXS	PPI	CLT	NHM	LVS		**42nd**	**22**	
1998	Team Pelfrey	WDW	PHX	INDY; Wth	TXS	NHM	DOV	CLT	PPIR	ATL	TXS	LVS	NC	–	

==== Indianapolis 500 ====
Year	Chassis	Engine	Start	Finish	Entrant
1977	Parnelli VPJ6B	Cosworth	7	20	Interscope Racing
1978	Parnelli VPJ6B	Cosworth	2	18	Interscope Racing
1979	Parnelli VPJ6C	Cosworth	27	4	Interscope Racing
1980	Parnelli VPJ6C	Cosworth	16	7	Interscope Racing
1981	Interscope 81	Cosworth	21	27	Interscope Racing
1982	Interscope 03	Cosworth	9	22	Interscope Racing
1983	March 83C	Cosworth	21	21	Interscope Racing
1984	March 84C	Cosworth	11	9	Interscope Racing
1985	March 85C	Cosworth	17	17	Interscope Racing
1986	March 86C	Buick	16	23	March Engineering
1987	Penske PC-16	Chevrolet	Practice Crash^{1}		Team Penske
1996	Lola T95/00	Menard-Buick	33^{2}	7	Team Menard
1998	Dallara	Oldsmobile	Practice Crash^{3}		Team Pelfrey

^{1} Al Unser succeeded Ongais as driver in the car; Unser won the Indianapolis 500 with a March-Cosworth that had been a show car.
^{2} After Scott Brayton was killed in a practice crash with a backup car, Ongais drove the car Brayton qualified on the pole; under USAC rules, the car had to start last.
^{3} John Paul Jr. succeeded Ongais as driver in the car; Paul finished 7th in the Indianapolis 500 after leading 39 laps.

=== 24 Hours of Le Mans results ===
Year	Team	Co-Drivers	Car	Class	Laps	Pos.	Class Pos.
1980	(Germany) Kremer Racing (Germany) Team Malardeau	(United States) Ted Field (France) Jean-Louis Lafosse	Porsche 935-K3/80	Gr.5; SP 2.0+	89	DNF	DNF
1982	(Germany) Kremer Racing (United States) Interscope Racing	(United States) Ted Field (United States) Bill Whittington	Porsche C-K5	Gr.C	25	DNF	DNF
1988	(Japan) Italiya Sport (Japan) Team Le Mans Co.	(Japan) Toshio Suzuki (France) Michel Trollé	March 88S-Nissan	C1	74	DNF	DNF
