= 1908 New Hampshire gubernatorial election =

- November 3, 1908
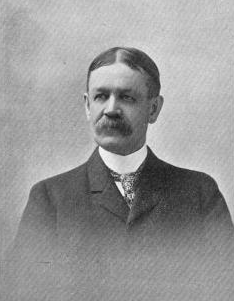

Nominee	Henry B. Quinby	Clarence E. Carr
Party	Republican	Democratic
Popular vote	44,630	41,386
Percentage	50.40%	46.74%
- Quinby: 40-50% 50–60% 60–70% 70–80% 80–90% >90% Carr: 40-50% 50–60% 60–70% 70–80% 80–90% >90%
Governor before election
Charles M. Floyd
Republican
Elected Governor
Henry B. Quinby
Republican

The 1908 New Hampshire gubernatorial election was held on November 3, 1908. Republican nominee Henry B. Quinby defeated Democratic nominee Clarence E. Carr with 50.40% of the vote.

== General election ==
=== Candidates ===
Major party candidates

- Henry B. Quinby, Republican
- Clarence E. Carr, Democratic

Other candidates

- Sumner F. Claflin, Socialist
- Edmund B. Tetley, Prohibition
- Walter H. Lewis, Independent

=== Results ===
1908 New Hampshire gubernatorial election
Party	Candidate	Votes	%	±%
Republican	Henry B. Quinby	44,630	50.40%	
Democratic	Clarence E. Carr	41,386	46.74%	
Socialist	Sumner F. Claflin	1,086	1.23%	
Prohibition	Edmund B. Tetley	895	1.01%	
Independent	Walter H. Lewis	511	0.58%	
Majority		3,244		
Turnout				
Republican hold		Swing		
