= Kay Fanning =

American journalist and newspaper editor

- Born: Katherine Woodruff; October 18, 1927; Joliet, Illinois
- Died: October 19, 2000 (aged 73); Boston, Massachusetts
- Education: Smith College
- Occupations: journalist, newspaper editor, publisher
- Known for: Editor & publisher of the Anchorage Daily News; Editor of the Christian Science Monitor
- Spouses: Marshall Field IV (m. 1950; div. 1963) Larry Fanning (m. 1966; died 1971) Amos "Mo" Matthews (m. 1982)
- Children: Ted; Katherine; Barbara

Katherine "Kay" Fanning (October 18, 1927 – October 19, 2000) was an American journalist and newspaper editor and publisher. She was editor and publisher of the Anchorage Daily News. In 1983, she became editor of the Christian Science Monitor in Boston, Massachusetts, becoming the first woman to edit an American national newspaper. She was the president of the American Society of News Editors from April 1987 to April 1988.

== Biography ==
Born Katherine Woodruff, she was the only child of a "small-town banker" in Illinois. Sent to private school, she later graduated from Smith College. After college, she returned to Illinois and soon met Marshall Field IV, heir to a large publishing business. They were married in 1950 and had three children together.

In 1963, Fanning, then Kay Field, decided to obtain a divorce from her husband (who died shortly afterwards) and after a difficult two years, she quit drinking, taking sleeping pills and tranquilizers, and resumed her study of Christian Science, which she had first come to know as a child. Embarking on a "new path", she soon "felt guided by intuition" to move to Alaska and in 1965, she and her three children moved to Anchorage. She soon got a part-time job at the Anchorage Daily News, her first job, but in a field she felt close to, having been married to a newspaper publisher for 13 years, and having had some experience at her college newspaper. Her early experience writing at the paper gave her a wide variety of assignments and topics, from dog sled races to tragedy to controversies, such as birth control. As a single mother, finding time to write was difficult and Fanning settled on writing from 3:00 to 7:00 in the morning.

In spring 1966, newspaper editor Larry Fanning came to visit. Formerly managing editor at the San Francisco Chronicle and later, editor at the Chicago Daily News, where he worked for Field's ex-husband. The two quickly married. Larry Fanning came to investigate the possibility of purchasing the Anchorage Daily News, the owners of which were nearing retirement. Both Kay Fields and Fanning grew interested in the idea, and though the financial prospects did not look good, they were not dissuaded, seeing the public service possibilities of the newspaper, wanting to provide an alternative voice and feeling that it would become a family venture involving her children, as well. After some difficult negotiations, they were able to buy the newspaper in September 1967.

Under the Fannings, the newspaper continued to have financial problems, but they hired a number of young journalists and directed the focus of the newspaper toward more investigative journalism.

In 1971, Kay Fanning became a widow for a second time when Larry died at age 57. She promptly took over management and editing of the paper. In 1976, the newspaper won a Pulitzer Prize for a report on the Alaska Teamsters Union. In spite of the new prestige, the newspaper's financial problems continued and she sold it to McClatchy Newspapers in January 1979. She remained as publisher, however, and circulation did increase, reaching 50,000 in 1982. Fanning stayed at the Anchorage Daily News until 1983, when she moved to Boston to work at the Christian Science Monitor and became the first woman to edit an American national newspaper.

In November 1988, Fanning and both the managing editor and the assistant managing editor all resigned from the Monitor in protest of plans to trim the newspaper from 28 pages to 16 and to cut the staff by up to 80 jobs. According to Fanning and the other two editors, the cuts were part of a plan to divert funds from the newspaper to the church's television venture, then in its second year and costing the church millions of dollars. Fanning also criticized restructuring that she said would give the business manager direct control of the Monitor's editorial content and with the cuts in funds and page count would mean "the serious weakening of [the Monitor's] editorial substance". The resignations were announced at a staff meeting, where it was reported Fanning's remarks drew applause. All Christian Scientists, the editors' resignations were not solely based on journalistic standards, they were also protests against what they saw as violations of religious principle and the ideals of Mary Baker Eddy, founder of both the Monitor and the Christian Science church.

== Personal life ==
Fanning had three children with her first husband, Marshall Field IV, a son, film producer and entrepreneur Ted Field, and two daughters. She was married to her second husband, Larry Fanning, in late summer, 1966. Her third husband was Mo Matthews. She died in October 2000, one day after her 73rd birthday.

== Recognition ==
The New York Times called Fanning "a prominent figure in American journalism" and the Los Angeles Times called her "one of the most prominent women in American journalism". In addition to serving on various national boards, she received numerous awards for her work, including the following:

- 1976 Pulitzer Prize, (Anchorage Daily News)
- 1980 Smith College Medal
- April 1987–April 1988 President of the American Society of News Editors
- 1988 Honorary LL.D degree from Harvard University
- 1996 Yankee Quill Award
- Inducted into the Alaska Women's Hall of Fame

== See also ==
- Cora Rigby, fellow Monitor staff and the first woman at a major paper to head a Washington News bureau.
