= SS Charles H. Marshall =

Liberty ship of WWII

- Charles H. Marshall on the river Scheldt

History

United States
- Name: Charles H. Marshall
- Namesake: Charles Henry Marshall
- Owner: War Shipping Administration (WSA)
- Operator: Polarus Steamship Co., Inc.
- Port of registry: Pensacola
- Ordered: as type (EC2-S-C1) hull, MC hull 2329
- Builder: J.A. Jones Construction Company, Panama City, Florida
- Cost: $921,909
- Yard number: 70
- Way number: 5
- Laid down: 11 October 1944
- Launched: 17 November 1944
- Sponsored by: Mrs. J. Philo Caldwell
- Completed: 27 November 1944
- Identification: US official number 246833; IMO number: 5312109; Call sign: KYUO
- Fate: Sold for commercial use, 9 March 1947; Placed in the National Defense Reserve Fleet, Wilmington, North Carolina, 30 December 1947

United States
- Name: Polarus Pioneer
- Owner: Polarus Steamship Co., Inc.
- Fate: Sold, May 1951

United States
- Name: Transamerican
- Owner: American Union Transport, Inc.
- Fate: Sold, October 1954

Liberia
- Name: Gertrud Therese
- Owner: Rutland Navigation Co.
- Operator: Transamerican Steamship Corp.
- Fate: Sold, 19 September 1959

United States
- Name: Pacific Thunder
- Owner: Pacific Thunder Steamship Corp.
- Operator: Transamerican Steamship Corp.
- Fate: Sold, 11 February 1960

United States
- Name: Transmariner
- Owner: Transamerican Steamship Corp.
- Fate: Sold, 7 October 1960

United States
- Name: Santa Emilia
- Owner: Liberty Navigation and Trading Co.
- Operator: J. H. Winchester & Co.
- Fate: Returned to Maritime Administration, laid up in James River Reserve Fleet, Lee Hall, Virginia, 23 December 1963; Sold for scrapping, 22 February 1972

General characteristics
- Class & type: Liberty ship; type EC2-S-C1, standard
- Tonnage: 10,865 LT DWT; 7,176 GRT
- Displacement: 3,380 long tons (3,434 t) (light); 14,245 long tons (14,474 t) (max)
- Length: 441 feet 6 inches (135 m) oa; 416 feet (127 m) pp; 427 feet (130 m) lwl
- Beam: 57 feet (17 m)
- Draft: 27 ft 9.25 in (8.4646 m)
- Installed power: 2 × Oil fired 450 °F (232 °C) boilers, operating at 220 psi (1,500 kPa); 2,500 hp (1,900 kW)
- Propulsion: 1 × triple-expansion steam engine, (manufactured by Filer and Stowell, Milwaukee, Wisconsin); 1 × screw propeller
- Speed: 11.5 knots (21.3 km/h; 13.2 mph)
- Capacity: 562,608 cubic feet (15,931 m^{3}) (grain); 499,573 cubic feet (14,146 m^{3}) (bale)
- Complement: 38–62 USMM; 21–40 USNAG
- Armament: Varied by ship; Bow-mounted 3-inch (76 mm)/50-caliber gun; Stern-mounted 4-inch (102 mm)/50-caliber gun; 2–8 × single 20-millimeter (0.79 in) Oerlikon anti-aircraft (AA) cannons and/or, 2–8 × 37-millimeter (1.46 in) M1 AA guns

SS Charles H. Marshall was a Liberty ship built in the United States during World War II. She was named after Charles H. Marshall, an American businessman, art collector and philanthropist who was prominent in society during the Gilded Age.

== Construction ==
Charles H. Marshall was contracted on 22 April 1943 by the United States Maritime Commission (MARCOM) with J.A. Jones Construction Company, Panama City, Florida as MARCOM Hull 2329. She was laid down on 11 October 1944, sponsored by Mrs. Clarence Graham, the wife of the assistant work manager of outfitting at JAJCC, launched on 17 November 1944 and delivered ten days later.

== History ==
On delivery on 27 November 1944, Polarus Steamship Co., Inc., New York, were appointed managers of Charles H. Marshall by the War Shipping Administration and she was registered in New York. On 9 April 1947 she was sold to Polarus Steamship and by 1950 renamed Polarus Pioneer.

After a series of sales and name changes she was returned to the Maritime Administration (MARAD) on 23 December 1963, under an exchange program, and placed in the James River Reserve Fleet, in Lee Hall, Virginia. She was sold for scrapping, 22 February 1972, to Eckhardt and Co., for $62,222. She was withdrawn from the fleet, 27 March 1972.

== Bibliography ==
- Davies, James (May 2004). "Specifications (As-Built)" (PDF). p. 23.
- "Jones Construction, Panama City FL". Shipbuilding History. 13 October 2010.
- Maritime Administration. "Charles H. Marshall". Ship History Database Vessel Status Card 7275. U.S. Department of Transportation, Maritime Administration. This article incorporates text from this source, which is in the public domain.
- Maritime Administration. "Santa Emilia". Ship History Database Vessel Status Card 4410. U.S. Department of Transportation, Maritime Administration. This article incorporates text from this source, which is in the public domain.
- Maritime Commission. "SS Charles H. Marshall".
- Merchant Vessels of the United States. US Treasury Department, Bureau of Customs. 1949. p. 850.
- Merchant Vessels of the United States. US Treasury Department, Bureau of Customs. 1950. p. 439.
