= Lynwood Palmer =

English painter

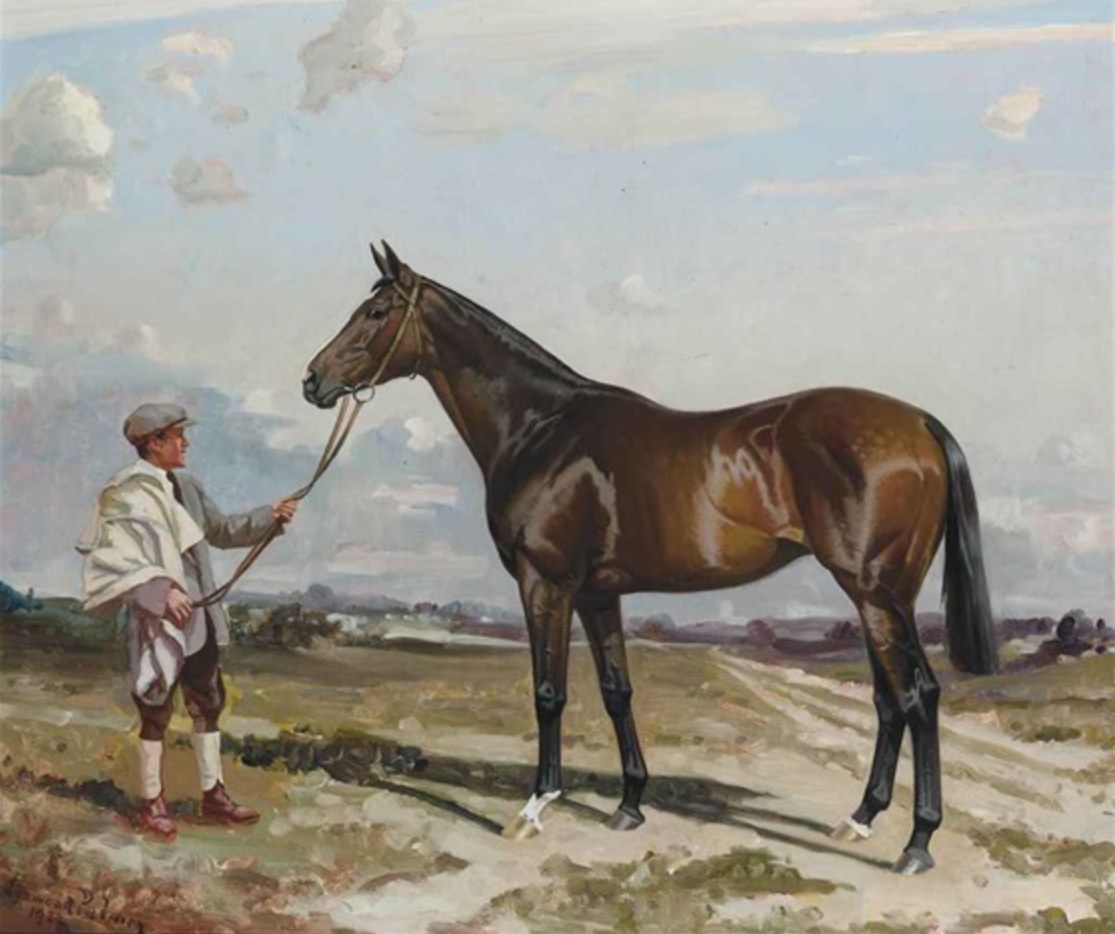
Golden Corn, a racehorse owned by Marshall Field III (1893–1956), grandson and heir of Palmer's early patron Marshall Field I (1834–1906). Painted by Palmer in 1922

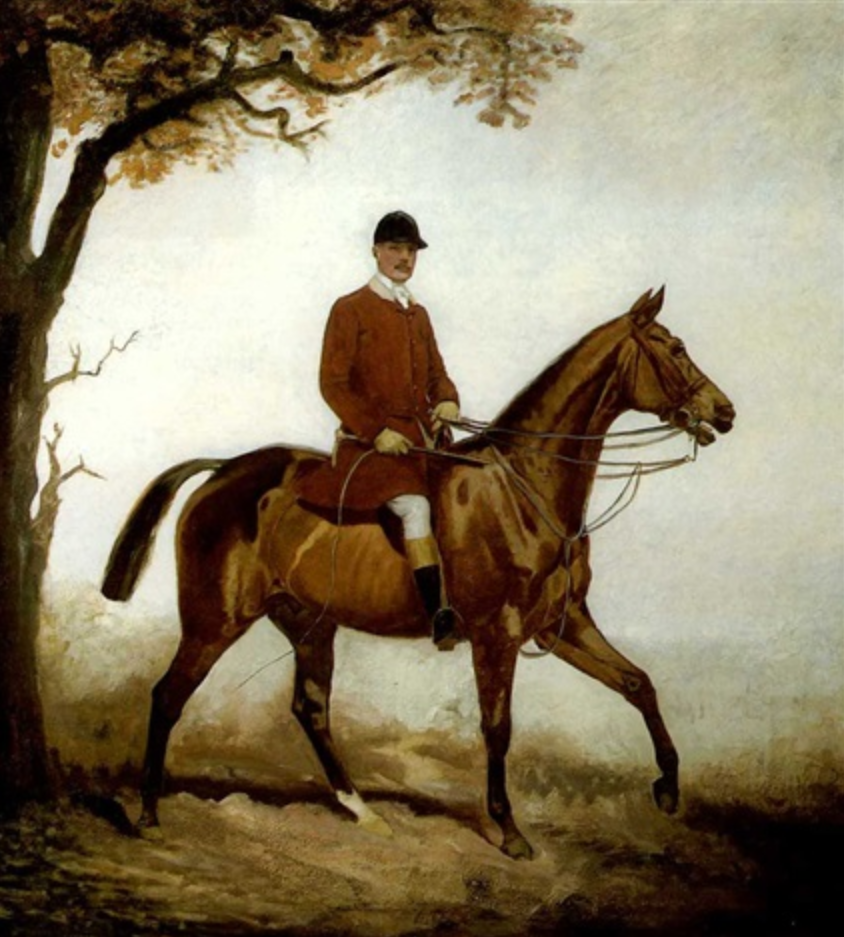
Lord Annaly, Master of the Pytchley Hunt. Portrait of Luke White, 3rd Baron Annaly (1857–1922), Master of the Pytchley Hunt 1902–1914, by Lynwood Palmer

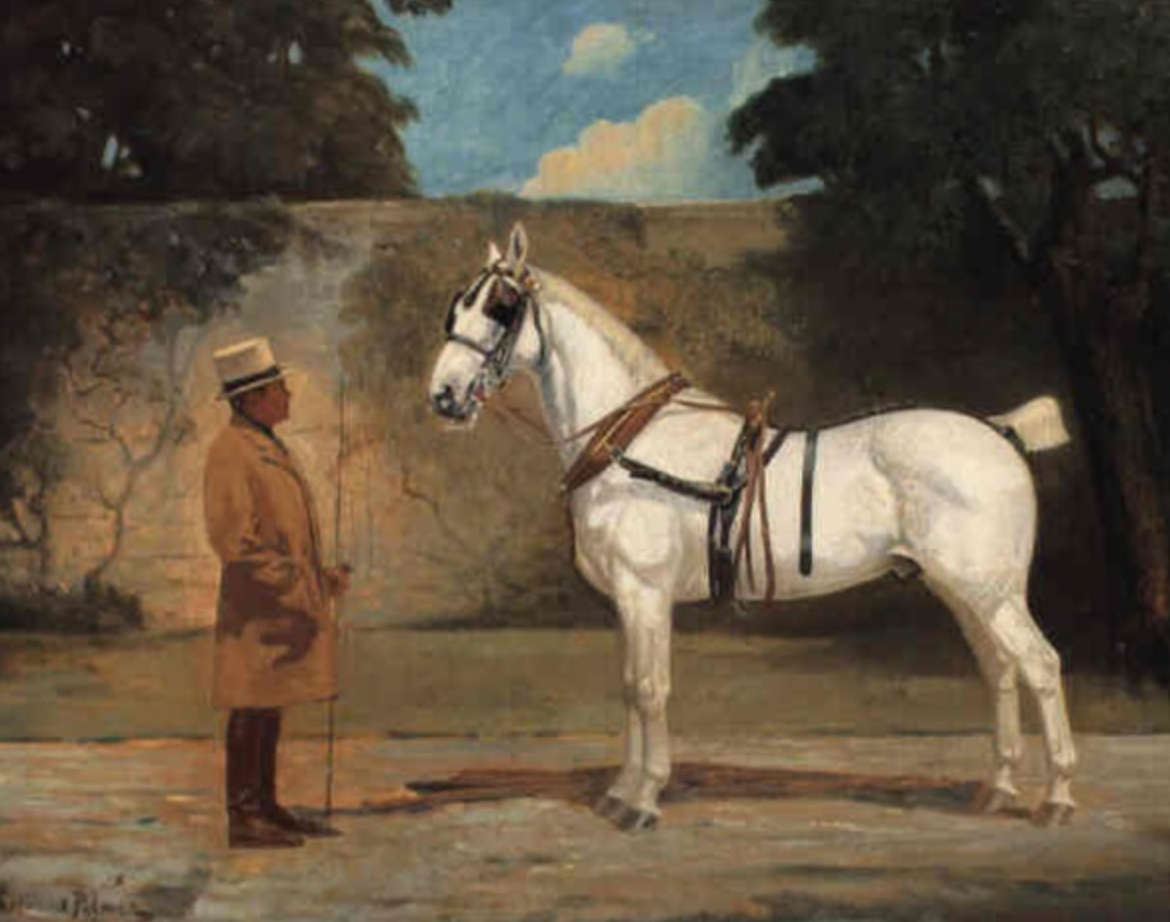
Ambrose Clark and favourite coach horse. Portrait of F. Ambrose Clark (1880–1964), American equestrian, by Lynwood Palmer

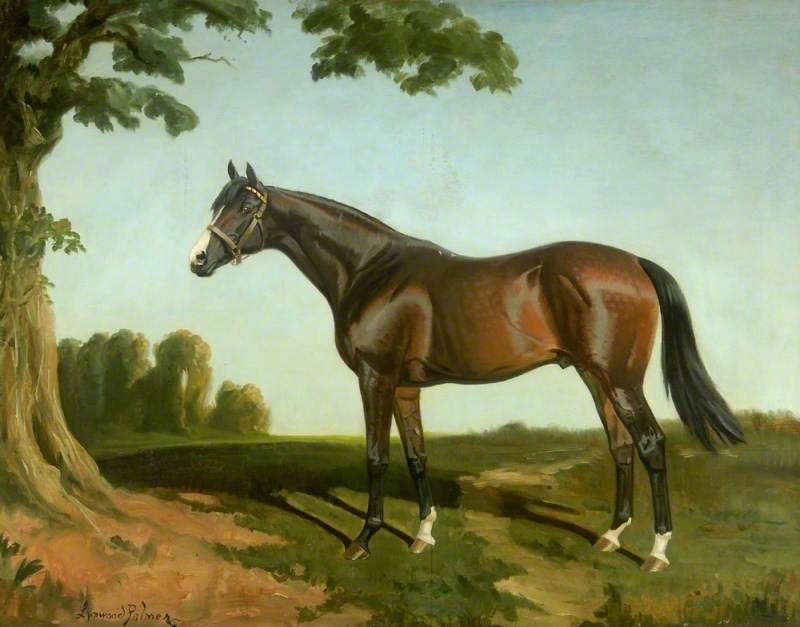
Royal Lancer, winner of the St Leger in 1922 owned by Lord Lonsdale by Palmer

James Lynwood Palmer (1868–1941) (Note: Known as "Lynwood Palmer", for example his portrait of Golden Corn signed and dated 'Lynwood Palmer/1922' (lower left), per Christie's catalogue description, lot 51, Christie's,!June 27, 2012, London https://www.invaluable.com/auction-lot/james-lyn-51-c-477682d162) was an English painter who specialised in painting race-horses, his characteristic style showing them as nervous and highly-strung, often depicted within a background of a dramatic landscape. His success as a leading equestrian portrait painter of the first half of the twentieth century is represented by around eight hundred paintings that were commissioned by clients, almost exclusively from private patrons, who included: William Cavendish-Bentinck, 6th Duke of Portland (1857–1943) (notably The Duke of Portland's stallions at Welbeck Stud ) (1900), Daisy Greville, Countess of Warwick (1861–1938) and King George V (1865–1936). He rarely exhibited his work to the public. (Note: An exhibition of his work was held at the Carlton Gallery, London, in 1898)

== Origins ==
He was born in 1868 at Market Rasen in Lincolnshire, the third son and the youngest of eight children of Rev. George Thomas Palmer (1836–1908) and Anna Frances Blair. His father, schooled in Bath, graduate of Peterhouse, Cambridge, was a career clergyman. Specifically he was vicar of Linwood, Lincolnshire from 1861 to 1869, (Note: Thus in 1863 noted as a member of the Lincoln Diocesan Architectural Society) an urban parish priest, then honorary canon of Rochester Cathedral (1890 to 1908). His older brother Charles Jasper was also an ordained minister.

Lynwood Palmer's childhood was spent in what within 15 years would officially be made inner parts of the County of London, where his father took the living (and thus in this era also priest-in-charge role) at St James' Church, Norlands, then from 1875 at St Mary Newington, in south London. He was educated at King's College School, and was destined by his father for a career in Law or in the Foreign Office. Palmer was not interested in such a course preferring horses and art at which he showed aptitude.

== Early career ==
In 1884, aged 17, Palmer left school without his parents blessing and emigrated to Canada, where he worked with horses on cattle ranches, as a hansom cab master and show jumper. His involvement in horse shows in Toronto, and from 1892 in New York provided him with contacts and developed his skill in sketching horses. According to Lyllyan Baldwin (1933) (Note: The author was Palmer's secretary.)

The first public success in his artistic career was perhaps that which came through the illustrations of an American catalogue of a sale of horses. The drawings received great praise and resulted in a number of commissions.

Palmer spent some years in the 1890s supplementing his artistic income in employment as a cab master. At this time Palmer showed great interest in carriage driving which led to commissions from Alfred Vanderbilt and Ambrose Clark and an increasing number of commissions for private clients and periodicals that included The American Carriage Monthly (1893) Although he had no formal training he developed an affinity for drawing and painting horses of all types: hunting, carriage, or race horses. He remained in North America for 11 years and found patrons who admired his style of painting and bought his works, including Marshall Field I (1834–1906), the American entrepreneur, prominent racehorse owner and founder of Marshall Field and Company, the Chicago-based department stores.

In 1895 Palmer returned to Europe with a nucleus of work to his credit, mostly from anglophile Americans A short stay followed with a relative in County Offaly where he garnered new contacts and future patrons that included T. K. Laidlaw before he and his wife Lydia returned to England, where they eventually settled in 1911 at the 16th Century White House at Sutton in the parish of Heston, Middlesex. A confident, well-dressed man he was at home with all types of horses and self-possessed enough to move smoothly between his aristocratic clientele. He prospered attributing his success to clients that included: the Earl of Derby, Lord Lonsdale, the Duke of Portland and most importantly Edward VII for whom he painted his Derby Stakes winner Minoru in 1909. It established him as a major painter of racehorses, a relatively small field that included his friend Alfred Munnings, Emile Adam, Lionel Edwards and Raoul Millais. Palmer created a niche for himself and his style and subject matter rarely deviated for the remainder of his career.

== Knowledge of horses ==
Palmer had a deserved reputation for his ability to treat lame horses, no doubt learnt as a result of his training as a cab master. In 1911 the Home Secretary, Reginald Mckenna, concerned at the injury rate of police horses on city cobbles asked Palmer to provide advice on the treatment of horses' hooves. Subsequently, some trainers would seek Palmer's advice. In his latter years he frequented Hounslow Barracks, the regimental mess of the 17/21 Lancers where his advice was sought and given. Palmer was also a judge at the International Horse Show at Olympia in 1921 but had been involved in its organisation since its inception in 1907. He designed a series of publicity postcards in pre-war years.

As an asthmatic Palmer was deemed not fit for military service during World War I, offering his skills for the service of the nation by managing a 750-horse stud for the Royal Mail.

== Racehorse paintings ==
Palmer's notoriety as an equine artist is largely based on his paintings of racehorses for an aristocratic, wealthy clientele that were united by wealth and interests. Palmer and Munnings became the preferred choice of this set when it came to painting their equine champions. Most of the commissions were for racehorses on the flat although Palmer painted seven winners of The Grand National.

Palmer painted winners of all the English and Irish classics and many Group winners beside. These included champion horses such as: the Earl Of Derby's Swynford, winner of the Eclipse Stakes and the St Leger, Tranquil, a success in the fillies classic, the 1,000 Guineas in 1923 and Hyperion, painted in 1933 after the colt won both the Derby and St Leger, Aboyeur, winner of the Suffragette Derby in 1913, Royal Lancer, owned by Earl Lonsdale and winner of the St Leger in 1922, Lord Woolavington's Derby winner Coronach, the undefeated The Tetrarch owned by Sir Hugh McCalmont and voted by the British National Horseracing Museum as the best English-trained two-year-old of the 20th century, Gainsborough, who in 1918 won the English Triple Crown and the Ascot Gold Cup for Lady Douglas, the first woman to own a classics winner and the filly Golden Corn, winner of the July Cup in 1923 and owned by Marshall Field III grandson of Palmer's early patron. There are four paintings in the Royal Collection including George V's 1000 Guineas winner Scuttle. The style always puts the horse at the centre of the painting, occasionally with a jockey and groom but usually within a featureless landscape.

== Carriage driving paintings ==
Palmer had a passion for carriage driving and was frequently seen driving his "beautifully maintained" coach and Four-in-hand. Some of his earliest paintings are of carriage driving in the United States and Canada. One of Palmer's first major commissions for August Belmont II, now at The Schwarz Gallery in Philadelphia features a four-in-hand horse carriage being driven along Ocean Drive, Newport, Rhode Island. Another major client Alfred Vanderbilt had moved to England by 1904 where he purchased fifty trotting horses, together with a team of carrige greys and two carriages which he based near Palmer at Kingsbury. Palmer painted at least four commissions for Vanderbilt before the latter returned to the United States in 1914. Other carriage-themed paintings for Ambrose Clark and Lady Warwick were commissioned. One of his most important patrons of the interwar years was Lord Woolavington, a collector of English sporting paintings for whom Palmer produced two, of carriage horses (and several racehorses besides).

== Technique ==
Lynwood Palmer possessed a retentive visual memory for the appearance of a horse. Invariably he made sketches from life, out of doors, if possible. He worked quickly and quietly trying to capture the character of the horse. In 1927 he explained his work as follows:The secret of painting race-horses lies in quickness. Their movements are so alert, they are so full of nervous energy, that the artist has to have a hand like a streak of lightning to catch the pose while it lasts. His paintings of race horses, nearly all on commission, are oil-on-canvas. The background is usually non-specific and the horse is centre stage. Palmer's knowledge of the anatomy of a horse was based on practical knowledge but he had studied George Stubbs Anatomy of a Horse in detail according to one of his pupils. His use of colour was limited and he did not shirk applying colours directly to the canvas to produce the iridescent sheen which are a feature of his paintings. Palmer's figures are often one-dimensional. Algernon Talmage, (Note: Admitted to the Royal Academy of Arts (R.A.)) an impressionist painter of the period, did some of the figures in these paintings. In 1925 Lynwood Palmer was painted by Talmage seated astride a carriage. The painting is in private hands.

Lynwood Palmer primarily strove to convey the nervous, highly strung character of a Thoroughbred horse painted within a dramatic and harmonious landscape. He remained within the tradition of racehorse artists influenced by predecessors : Harry Hall, John Frederick Herring Sr. and his son John Frederick Herring Jr, James Ward. His success as an artist was largely derived through his ability to infuse into his expert draughtsmanship his thorough and first-hand understanding of the characteristics of the animals he was painting.

== Personal life ==
In 1895 whilst living in the United States he met and married Lydia Frohawk of Dereham, Norfolk, the daughter of a local landowner. Her brother was Frederick William Frohawk (1861–1946), an established zoological artist and lepidopterist. The marriage lasted until his death at Heston on 22 June 1941, his wife dying in 1942. Palmer's health had declined following a serious injury when kicked by one of his equine subjects close to the heart, which affected him considerably in his later years.

In his will Palmer left personal possessions including his riding crop and glasses to his housekeeper Mary Cox, which were sold at auction by Sotheby's on 1 November 2006. His long-standing friend Hugh McCausland was left the bulk of his free estate of £5412.6(equivalent to £236,000 in 2025). Palmer's studio became a dance hall and his house, "The White House", 28, Upper Sutton Lane, noted in the Victoria County History of Middlesex to be "timber-framed and contains 16th-century features, including an original roof", later "cased with brickwork" and given "several additions and alterations"- was acquired from its subsequent owners by the Council under a compulsory purchase order, then destroyed in an arson attack which cleared the way for construction of the residential Palmer Close, which stands on the site today.
