= Robert P. Bass =

American politician (1873–1960)

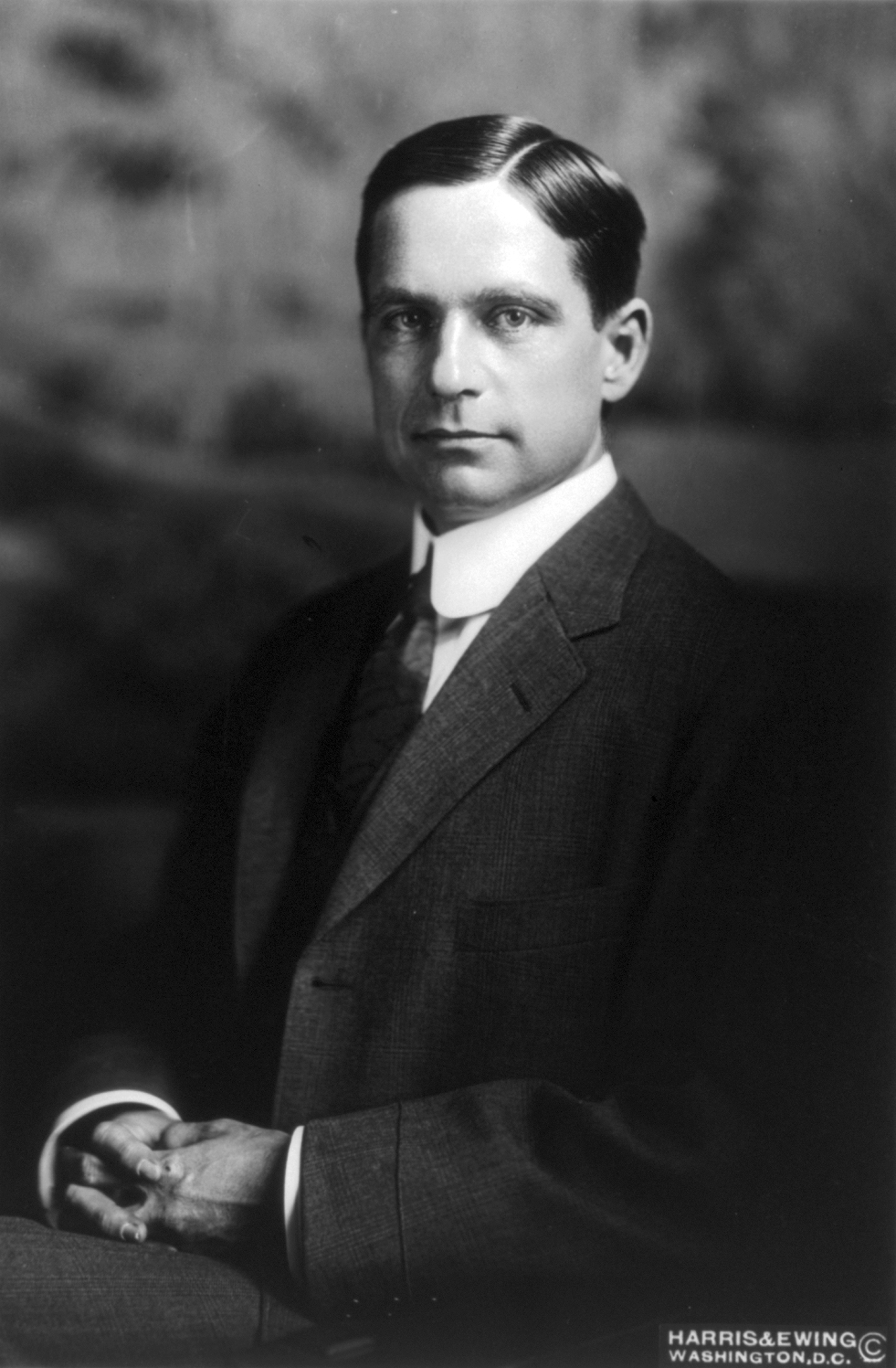
- Bass in 1912

53rd Governor of New Hampshire
- In office January 5, 1911 – January 2, 1913
- Preceded by: Henry B. Quinby
- Succeeded by: Samuel D. Felker

Member of the New Hampshire Senate
- In office 1910

Member of the New Hampshire House of Representatives
- In office 1905; 1909

Personal details
- Born: September 1, 1873 Chicago, Illinois
- Died: July 29, 1960 (aged 86) Peterborough, New Hampshire
- Party: Republican
- Spouse: Edith Harland Bird

Robert Perkins Bass (September 1, 1873 – July 29, 1960) was an American farmer, forestry expert, and Republican politician from Peterborough, New Hampshire. He served in both houses of the New Hampshire Legislature and as chairman of the state's Forestry Commission before serving as the 53rd governor of New Hampshire from 1911 to 1913.

He started one of the state's political dynasties. Both his son, Perkins Bass, and grandson, Charles F. Bass, were elected to the U.S. House of Representatives. His wife, Edith Harland Bird, was the daughter of Massachusetts businessman Charles Sumner Bird. His daughter, Joanne, was the first wife of Marshall Field IV, heir to the Marshall Field's fortune and publishing mogul.

== Early life ==
The son of Perkins Bass and Clara (Foster) Bass, he was born in Chicago, Illinois in 1873, but his family moved to Peterborough when he was nine in 1883. He grew up on a family farm that is still owned by his descendants. He graduated from Harvard College in 1896.

Gertrude Bass Warner (May 14, 1863 – July 29, 1951), an art collector with particular interests in Asian art, was his sister.

== Career ==
He was elected to the New Hampshire House of Representatives in 1905 and 1909 and the New Hampshire Senate in 1910. He was the state's governor from 1911 to 1913.

His status was hurt, however, after 1912. That year, he had supported Theodore Roosevelt for president, in the breakaway Progressive Party, against the Republican incumbent, William Howard Taft. The move threw the state Republicans into disarray and led to a Democratic governor and a Democratic legislature. In retaliation, the party rejected Bass when he sought a US Senate seat in 1913 and 1926.

Bass is remembered today for his stint as chairman of the New Hampshire Forestry Commission when popular concern with forests' well-being was intense because of extreme overlogging in the White Mountains. Also notable is his sponsorship of legislation that led to the first direct primary law east of the Mississippi River.

In 1945, Bass, along with retired Supreme Court Associate Justice Owen J. Roberts, convened the assembly that produced the Dublin Declaration, which proposed the transformation of the United Nations General Assembly into a world legislature with "limited but definite and adequate power for the prevention of war." he died in 1960.

Party political offices
Preceded by Henry B. Quinby	Republican nominee for Governor of New Hampshire; 1910	Succeeded by Franklin Worcester
Political offices
Preceded by Henry B. Quinby	Governor of New Hampshire; 1911–1913	Succeeded by Samuel D. Felker
