= Alaska Journal of Commerce =

American print and online publication

- Type: Publication
- Owner: Binkley Co.
- Publisher: Deedie Mckenzie
- Editor-in-chief: Andrew Jensen
- Staff writers: Elwood Brehmer, DJ Summers, Stephanie Prokop, Tim Bradner
- Founded: 1976; 49 years ago
- Language: English
- Headquarters: Anchorage, Alaska
- Sister newspapers: Juneau Empire, Homer News, Peninsula Clarion, The Alaska Star
- ISSN: 1537-4947
- OCLC number: 42325896
- Website: alaskajournal.com

Alaska Journal of Commerce is a print and online publication based in Anchorage, Alaska. It covers business and industry in the state of Alaska, the publication was started in 1976 and was acquired by Morris Communications in 1995. Current owner Binkley Co., owner of the Anchorage Daily News, acquired the Journal in 2018.

The Alaska Journal sponsors a "Top 40 Under 40" each year to recognize young professionals in the state. The publication is a member of the Associated Press.
