= London Champ Car Trophy =

- Venue: Brands Hatch
- First race: 1978
- Last race: 2003
- Distance: 196.680 miles
- Laps: 165
- Previous names: Daily Mail Indy Trophy (1978); London Champ Car Trophy (2003)
- Most wins (driver): Rick Mears (1); Sébastien Bourdais (1)
- Most wins (team): Team Penske (1); Newman/Haas Racing (1)
- Most wins (manufacturer): Chassis: Penske (1); Lola (1); Engine: Cosworth (2)

The London Champ Car Trophy was an automobile race sanctioned by CART, it was held at Brands Hatch in England. The event was held in 1978 and 2003.

== Race History ==
=== 1978 ===
United States Auto Club added two events in England in 1978, one of the races was at Brands Hatch and was won by Rick Mears, the event was dropped for 1979 after a split between USAC and CART.

=== 2003 ===
The series held two previous events in the United Kingdom at the Rockingham Motor Speedway in Corby for 2001 and 2002 but it was dropped from the 2003 schedule in November 2002 because of poor attendance and inclement weather. Brands Hatch's return was publicly announced at the Autosport International Show in Birmingham on 9 January 2003, and it was held on the Indy configuration. CART president and CEO Chris Pook cited the track's proximity from London and the history of the Brands Hatch circuit as the primary reasons of hosting the race there. He also stated that the Brands Hatch Grand Prix configuration could not be used because of the high cost of upgrading it to CART standards. It was part of CART's desire to distance itself from the Indy Racing League by holding races outside the United States.

Brands Hatch and CART invested $2 million in enhancing the track's safety standards; 2 miles (3.2 kilometres) of fencing was erected around each side of the Indy layout, around 38,000 tyres were used to construct barriers and the majority of the guard-railing alongside the circuit was reconstructed. The improvements were completed on the day before the official announcement of the race. Tim Mayer, CART's international and development liaison officer, admitted more efforts were needed to upgrade the track to obtain an FIA Grade 2 licence for a potential future event on the Grand Prix layout and noted that its history had to be regarded when altering it for increased space. The race was won by Sébastien Bourdais, the event was dropped for 2004 after CART went bankrupt.

== Race winners ==
Year	Date	Driver	Team	Chassis	Engine	Race Distance		Race Time	Average Speed (mph)	Report	Ref
Year	Date	Driver	Team	Chassis	Engine	Laps	Miles (km)	Race Time	Average Speed (mph)	Report	Ref
USAC Championship Car
1978	7 October	(United States) Rick Mears	Team Penske	Penske	Cosworth	100	120.000 (193.121)	1:15:23	95.788	Report	
1979 – 2002	Not held										
CART/Champ Car World Series
2003	5 May	(France) Sébastien Bourdais	Newman/Haas Racing	Lola	Ford-Cosworth	165	196.680 (316.470)	1:51:56	105.412	Report	
