= Charles Henry Marshall =

American businessman, art collector and philanthropist

Commissioner of Docks and Ferries of the City of New York
- In office May 9, 1887 – May 22, 1888

Personal details
- Born: February 19, 1838 Easton, New York, U.S.
- Died: July 2, 1912 (aged 74) Paris, France
- Spouse: Josephine Mozier Banks (m. 1888)
- Children: Evelyn Isabella Marshall; Charles Henry Marshall III
- Relatives: Marshall Field III (son-in-law); Alice Huntington (daughter-in-law); Brooke Russell (daughter-in-law); Diego Suarez (son-in-law); Marshall Field IV (grandson)
- Education: Columbia College

Charles Henry Marshall Jr. (February 19, 1838 – July 2, 1912) was an American businessman, art collector and philanthropist who was prominent in society during the Gilded Age.

== Early life ==
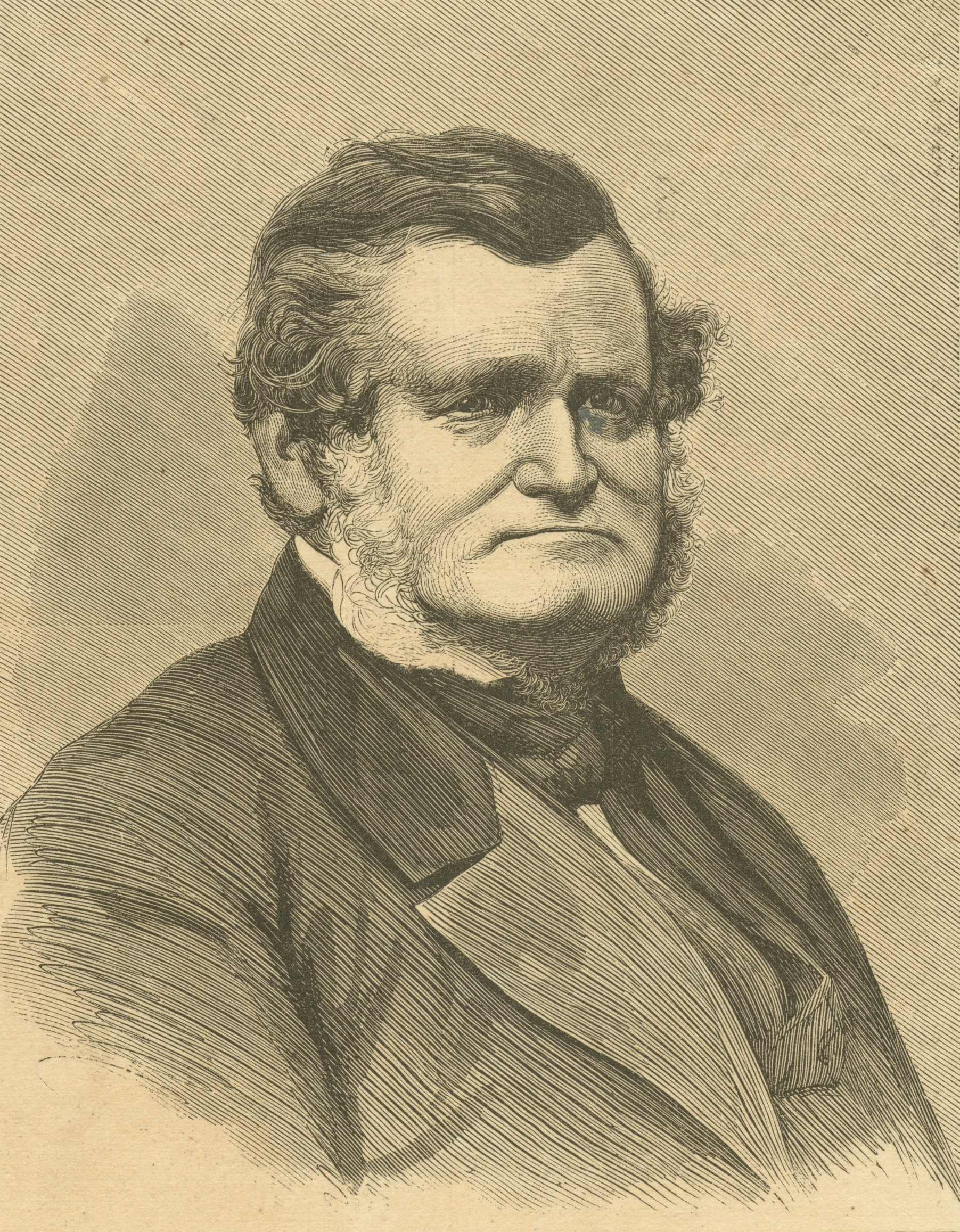
His father, Captain Charles H. Marshall

Marshall was born on February 19, 1838, in Easton, New York. He was the son of Capt. Charles Henry Marshall (1792–1865) and Fidelia (née Wellman) Marshall (1800–1840). His siblings were Mary Marshall (the wife of William Allen Butler and mother of Howard Russell Butler), Fidelia Wellman Marshall, Malvina Marshall (who married Daniel Sidney Appleton), and Helen Marshall (wife of William Stanley Haseltine). His father was a businessman and merchant who fought in the War of 1812 and became the proprietor of Black Ball Packet Line.

Marshall graduated from Columbia College in 1858.

== Career ==
Marshall was a businessman and merchant who ran the firm of Charles H. Marshall and Co. He also had holdings in transatlantic steamship companies and various insurance companies. He served as a director of the Liverpool & London & Globe Insurance Company of New York, the Hanover National Bank, the Hanover Safe Deposit Company, the Atlantic Mutual Insurance Company and a trustee of the Seamen's Bank for Savings.

In 1887, he was appointed Commissioner of Docks and Ferries by New York Mayor Abram Hewitt and served as a member of the subcommittee of Seventy on the Improvement of the City Waterfront.

=== Society life ===
In 1892, Marshall and his wife were included in Ward McAllister's "Four Hundred", purported to be an index of New York's best families, published in The New York Times. Conveniently, 400 was the number of people that could fit into Mrs. Astor's ballroom.

Marshall was also an avid art collector, was a member of the Metropolitan Club, the Union Club, the Century Club, the Riding Club, the Round Table Club of New York and the Cobden Club of London.

== Personal life ==
On April 30, 1888, Marshall was married to Josephine Mozier Banks (1860–1933). Josephine, who was born in Middletown, Rhode Island, was the second daughter of Dr. James Lenox Banks and Isabella (née Mozier) Banks. She was also a niece of bibliophile and philanthropist James Lenox. Together, they maintained a home at 6 East 77th Street in New York City and were the parents of:

- Evelyn Isabella Marshall (1889–1979), who married banker and publisher Marshall Field III (1893–1956) in 1915. They divorced in 1930, and in 1937 she married Diego Suarez Costa (1888–1974), counselor to the Colombian delegation to the United Nations in 1937 who later became the press attaché and minister counselor for Chile in Washington, D.C. from 1948 until 1952.
- Charles Henry "Buddie" Marshall III (1891–1952), who married Alice Ford Huntington, a daughter of Bob Huntington and sister of Helen Huntington (the first wife of Vincent Astor). They divorced and in 1932, he married Brooke (née Russell) Kuser (1902–2007). Brooke, the daughter of John H. Russell Jr. (16th Commandant of the Marine Corps), was divorced from New Jersey State Senator John Dryden Kuser. Brooke's son from her first marriage, Anthony Dryden Marshall, adopted the Marshall surname. After Charles' death, Brooke became the third wife of Vincent Astor in 1953.

Marshall died from an acute aneurysm at his apartment, at 44 Rue de Villejust in Paris, France, on July 2, 1912.

=== Descendants ===
Through his daughter Evelyn, he was the grandfather of Barbara Field (1918–1984), Bettine Field, Marshall Field IV (1916–1965), the owner of the Chicago Sun-Times.

Through his son Charles, he was the grandfather of Peter Marshall and Helen Huntington Marshall (1918–2007), who married conductor Ernest Schelling and, after Schelling's death, cellist János Scholz.

== Legacy and honors ==
- The World War II Liberty Ship SS Charles H. Marshall was named in his honor.
