= Golden Corn =

English thoroughbred

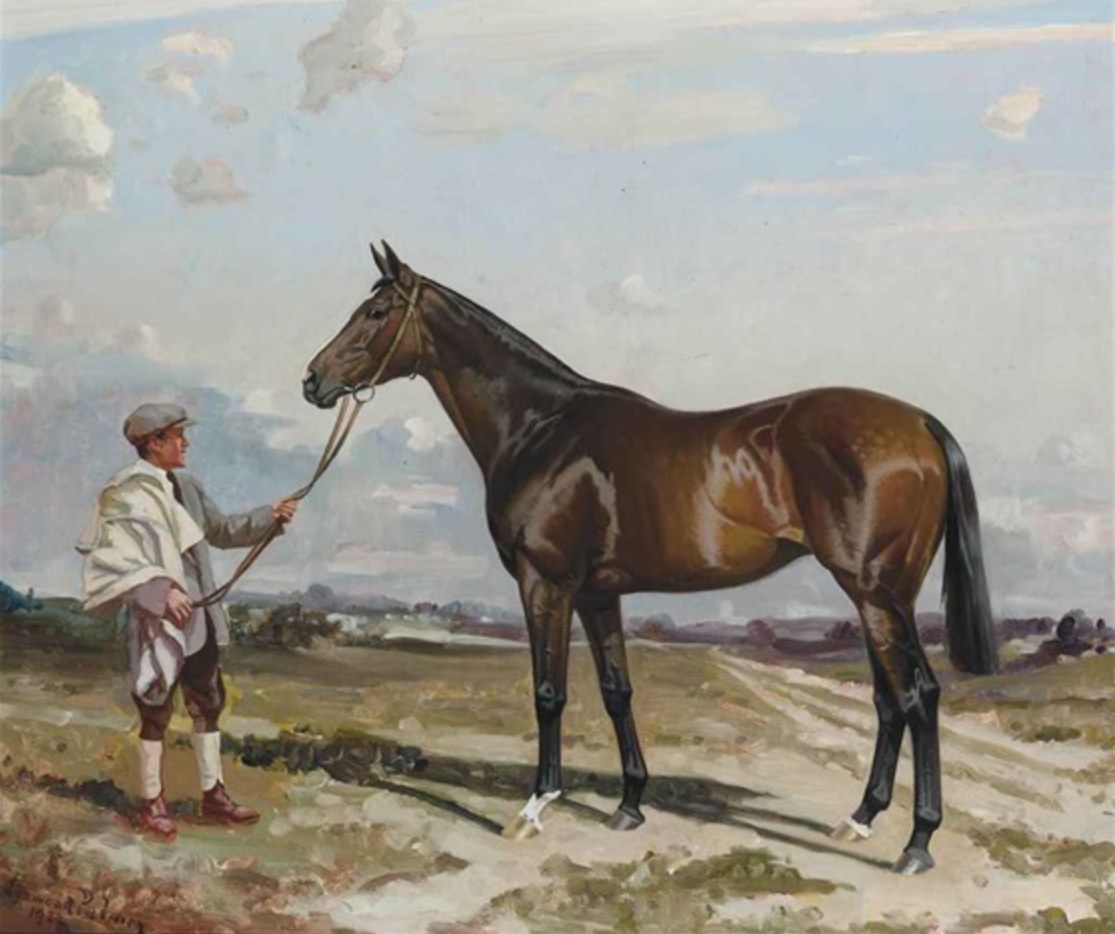
- Golden Corn by Lynwood Palmer (1868-1941)
- Sire: Golden Sun
- Grandsire: Sundridge
- Dam: Corncockle
- Damsire: St Frusquin
- Sex: Mare
- Foaled: 1919
- Country: United Kingdom of Great Britain and Ireland
- Colour: Brown bay
- Breeder: Robert Brassey
- Owner: Marshall Field III
- Trainer: Hugh Powney; Cecil Charles Boyd-Rochfort

Major wins
- Champagne Stakes, Doncaster (1921); Middle Park Stakes, Newmarket (1921); July Cup Newmarket (1923)
- Last updated on 28 February 2025

Golden Corn (1919 - 1935), was an English-bred, throughbred filly horse who was one of the top rated two-year-olds of 1921. Her wins in 1921 included The Middle Park Stakes. She stayed in training for three seasons, adding the July Cup in 1923. As a brood mare she had a number of winners, including Cornbelt, winner of the John Porter Stakes.

== Breeding ==
Golden Corn was highly bred, particularly on her dam side, which included several important racehorses of the late Victorian era, including the Triple Crown winner Isinglass, an Ascot Gold Cup winner in Isonomy and the undefeated St Simon. Her sire St Frusquin was the top two-year-old of 1895 when his five wins included the Middle Park Plate and the Dewhurst Plate. Her sire's breeding proved dominant as Golden Corn excelled as a two-year-old at five and six furlongs.

== Racing ==
Golden Corn, who was originally registered with the name Maize, was a bay or brown filly with a white blaze on her face and two white socks. She was trained at Newmarket by Hugh Powney and Cecil Boyd-Rochfort, later trainer to Queen Elizabeth II. Her owner was Marshall Field III an American investment banker. She was outstanding as a two-year-old, winning all her starts bar one and was rated top of her generation in 1921. Her successes that year included the Champagne Stakes at Doncaster and the Middle Park Stakes at Newmarket. Her three-year-old career was underwhelming; she ran third in the fillies classic, the 1000 Guineas at Newmarket behind the winner Silver Urn and Soubriquet, apparently failing to stay the distance of one mile. She stayed in training as a four-year-old, adding the July Cup at Newmarket, when ridden by Joe Childs, to her victories.

== As brood mare ==
Golden Corn had some success as a brood mare, including Cornbelt, winner of the John Porter Stakes at Newbury. She was also dam of Cross of Gold, sent to the United States and herself dam of six winners including Camelot, the dam of the Kentucky Oaks' winner Blue Grass, also owned by Marshal Field III.

She was painted by Lynwood Palmer. (Note: Lynwood Palmer (1868-1941) was one of the pre eminent painters of racehorses of the period. The painting of Golden Corn was commissioned and carried out in 1922 for breeder Captain Robert Bingham Brassey.) (Note: The painting of Golden Corn remained with Brassey's descendants until 2012 when it was sold at Christie's in London.)
