= Marshall Field III =

American investment banker, publisher, racehorse owner, and philanthropist (1893–1956)

- Field in 1919
- Born: September 28, 1893; Chicago, Illinois, U.S.
- Died: November 8, 1956 (aged 63); New York City, U.S.
- Resting place: Graceland Cemetery
- Education: Eton College; Cambridge University
- Occupations: Investment banker; publisher; racehorse owner; breeder; philanthropist
- Known for: Founder of Chicago Sun & Parade magazine
- Political party: Republican
- Spouses: Evelyn Marshall (m. 1915; div. 1930) Audrey Evelyn James Coats (m. 1930; div. 1934) Ruth Pruyn Phipps (m. 1936)
- Children: 5, including Marshall IV
- Relatives: Marshall Field (grandfather); Ethel Field (aunt); Edgar Uihlein (cousin)
- Military career
- Allegiance: United States
- Branch: United States Army
- Service years: 1917–1918
- Units: 1st Illinois Cavalry Regiment; 122nd Field Artillery Regiment

Marshall Field III (September 28, 1893 – November 8, 1956) was an American investment banker, publisher, racehorse owner/breeder, philanthropist, grandson of businessman Marshall Field, heir to the Marshall Field department store fortune, and a leading financial supporter and founding board member of Saul Alinsky's community organizing network Industrial Areas Foundation.

== Early life ==
Born on September 28, 1893 in Chicago, Cook County, Illinois, he was the son of Albertine Huck, daughter of German businessman Louis Carl Huck, and Marshall Field II. He was raised primarily in England, where he was educated at Eton College and the University of Cambridge.

During a westbound Atlantic crossing aboard the RMS Lusitania in September 1914, Field became enamoured with fellow passenger Evelyn Marshall, and proposed to her before the liner's arrival in New York, less than a week after sailing from England.

In 1917, he joined the 1st Illinois Cavalry and served with the 122nd Field Artillery in France during World War I. He built an estate in 1925.

== Career ==
On his discharge after the war, Field returned to Chicago where he went to work as a bond salesman at Lee, Higginson & Co. After learning the business, he left to open his own investment business. A director of Guaranty Trust Co. of New York City, he eventually teamed up with Charles F. Glore and Pierce C. Ward to create the investment banking firm of Marshall Field, Glore, Ward & Co. In 1926, Field left the firm to pursue other interests.

Already a recipient of substantial money from the estate of his grandfather Marshall Field, on his 50th birthday he inherited the bulk of the remainder of the family fortune. His brother, Henry Field, who was to have shared in the fortune, had died in 1917.

=== Publishing industry ===
He was primarily a publisher, and in late 1941 he founded the Chicago Sun, which later became the Chicago Sun-Times. The primary investor in the newspaper PM, he eventually bought out the other investors to become the publisher. He also created Parade as a weekly magazine supplement for his own paper and for others in the United States. By 1946, Parade had achieved a circulation of 3.5 million.

In 1944, Marshall Field III formed the private holding company Field Enterprises. That same year, he purchased Simon & Schuster and Pocket Books. After his death, his heirs sold the company back to its founders, Richard L. Simon and M. Lincoln Schuster, while Leon Shimkin and James M. Jacobson acquired Pocket Books.

=== Thoroughbred racing ===
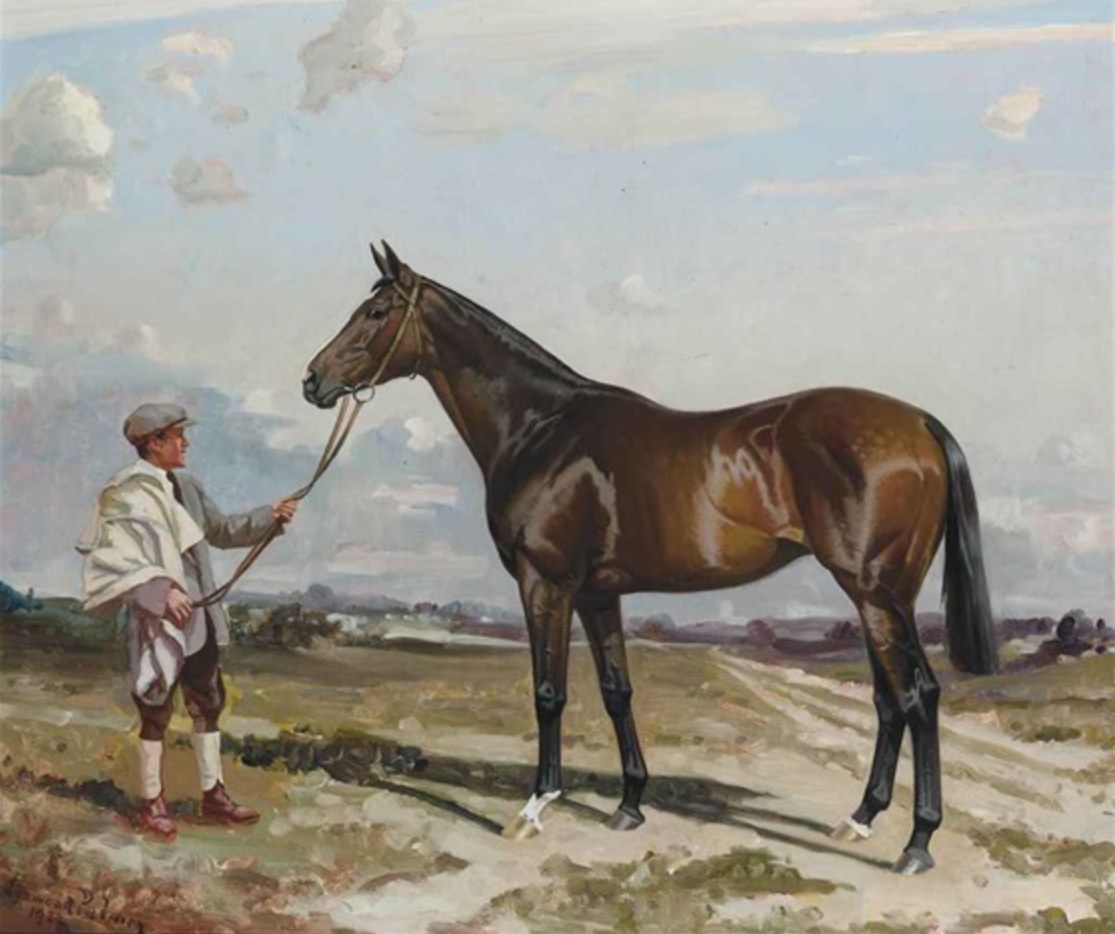
Golden Corn, a racehorse owned by Marshall Field III, painted by Lynwood Palmer in 1922

A polo player, Field invested heavily in Thoroughbred racehorses in the United States and in Great Britain. Among his successful British horses were three fillies, who won the Irish Oaks, Golden Corn, who won England's Middle Park Stakes and Champagne Stakes in 1921 and the July Cup in 1923. In the United States, Nimba was the 1927 American Champion Three-Year-Old Filly, and Tintagel won the 1935 Futurity Stakes and was voted American Champion Two-Year-Old Colt.

In 1926, one year after his estate was built, Marshall Field partnered with Robert A. Fairbairn, William Woodward Sr., and Arthur B. Hancock to import Sir Gallahad III from France to stand at stud in the United States. One of their horses, named Assignation, born in 1930, was the great-great grandfather of Secretariat.

The Marshall Field III Estate is a mansion built in 1925 on Long Island Sound which was designed by architect John Russell Pope. It was built on the grounds of a 1,400-acre (5.7 km^{2}) estate, now called Caumsett State Historic Park Preserve, which he purchased in 1921. It is a New York State Historic Site.

== Philanthropy ==
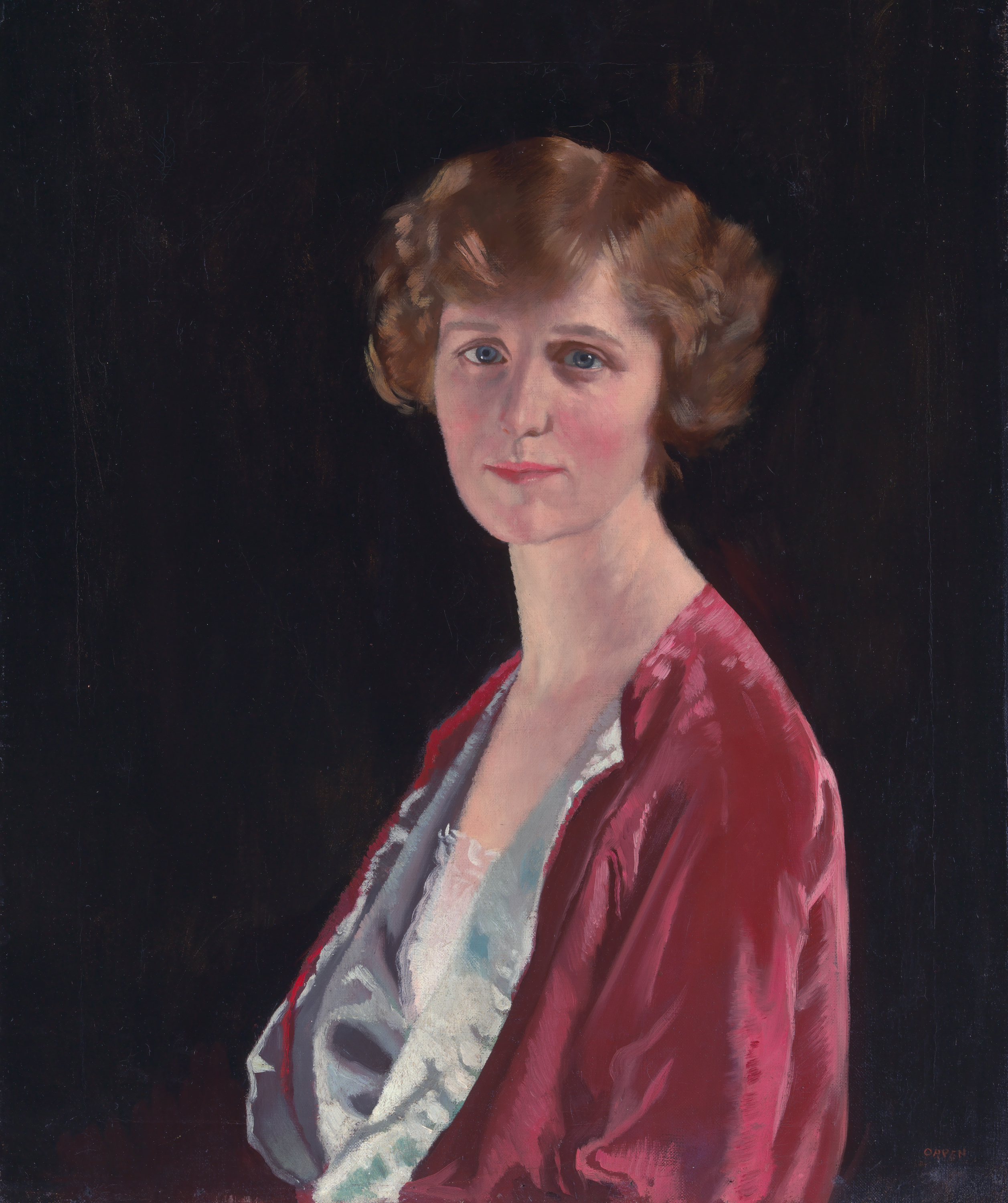
Evelyn Marshall Field, by William Orpen, 1921

Field supported a number of charitable institutions and in 1940 created the Field Foundation. He personally served as president of the Child Welfare League of America. He also donated substantial funds to support the New York Philharmonic and served as its president. In 1941 Field was the president (or the chairman—sources differ) of the United States Committee for the Care of European Children.

== Personal life and death ==
By his first wife, Evelyn Marshall (the daughter of Charles Henry Marshall), he had daughters Barbara Field and Bettina Field and son Marshall Field IV. By his second wife, of whom he was the second husband, Audrey Evelyn James, whom he married on August 18, 1930, and divorced in Reno, Washoe County, Nevada, in 1934, he left no issue.

Field died on November 8, 1956 of brain cancer and was buried at Graceland Cemetery.

His widow and third wife, Ruth Pruyn Field, who had previously been married to sportsman Ogden Phipps, died on January 25, 1994, at 86. They had two daughters, Phyllis Field and Fiona Field.
