= Anchorage Daily News =

Daily newspaper based in Alaska, US

- Type: Daily newspaper
- Format: Broadsheet
- Owner: Binkley Co.
- Publisher: Ryan Binkley
- President: Ryan Binkley
- Editor: Vicky Ho
- Founded: 1946
- Language: English
- Headquarters: 300 W. 31st Ave; Anchorage, AK 99503; United States
- Circulation: 19,000 (digital); 57,622 (daily); 71,223 (Sunday)
- ISSN: 0194-6870
- Website: adn.com

Front page of the Anchorage Daily News, Sept. 11, 2006

The Anchorage Daily News is a newspaper published by the Binkley Co., and based in Anchorage, Alaska. It is the most widely read newspaper and news website (adn.com) in the state of Alaska. The newspaper is headquartered in Anchorage, with bureaus in Wasilla and Juneau.

== History ==
=== Early history ===
The Anchorage Daily News was born as the weekly Anchorage News, publishing its first issue January 13, 1946. The paper's founder and first publisher was Norman C. Brown. The early president of the paper's parent company was Harry J. Hill, who was also assistant treasurer of The Lathrop Company. This established the theory that Cap Lathrop was really behind the publication, but didn't wish to have his name formally associated with it, unlike his other newspapers such as the Fairbanks Daily News-Miner. Brown did share Lathrop's views on the statehood issue. Brown became a leader in the short-lived mid-1950s movement to turn Alaska into a commonwealth rather than a state.

The newspaper became an afternoon daily in May 1948, although it wouldn't publish a Sunday newspaper until June 13, 1965. By then, the Anchorage Daily News had become a morning newspaper, making that switch on April 13, 1964.

By the 1970s, the gradual downturn in the newspaper industry was taking its toll on the ADN. Lawrence Fanning had purchased the paper in 1968, but suffered a heart attack at his desk and died in 1971. His widow, Katherine Woodruff "Kay" Fanning, took over. Kay Fanning had previously been married into the Marshall Field family (she was the mother of Ted Field). This was of no help to her, as the paper plunged further into debt as the decade wore on. In 1974, Fanning entered into a joint operating agreement with the Anchorage Times. Times publisher Robert Atwood cancelled the agreement 4 years later. By this point, the paper's news-gathering and editorial operations were operating out of a small two-story storefront building at the corner of West Seventh Avenue and I Street.

=== Purchase by the McClatchy Company ===
The McClatchy Company purchased the Daily News in 1979, when it bought a controlling interest from Kay Fanning, who had been editor and publisher since Larry Fanning's death in 1971. Kay Fanning continued as the head of the paper until mid-1983. While retaining some financial interest in the paper, she went on to become the editor of The Christian Science Monitor.

The Daily News was the first of two newspapers that the then-122-year-old, California-based, McClatchy Company bought outside the state; the Kennewick, Washington, Tri-City Herald was the next. McClatchy would later grow to become a national newspaper company, including the purchase of the Knight-Ridder chain in 2006.

=== Purchase by the Alaska Dispatch ===
In April, 2014, it was announced that the Alaska Dispatch web publication would be buying the Anchorage Daily News for US$34 million. The deal closed in May 2014. On Sunday, July 20, 2014, the Alaska Dispatch, renamed the paper the Alaska Dispatch News.

=== Binkley Co. ownership ===
Adn.com announced on August 13, 2017, that it had filed for bankruptcy after being sued for back rent by Alaska telecommunications company GCI. Control of operations was immediately assumed by a group led by Ryan Binkley of Fairbanks, who were in the process of purchasing the paper. Binkley is the son of John Binkley, a Republican politician. In November 2017, the paper's Facebook page reverted its name back to Anchorage Daily News; the paper itself rebranded to Anchorage Daily News on November 18.

Binkley Co. acquired the Alaska Journal of Commerce in 2018. In 2019, Binkley Co. acquired the Arctic Sounder, the Bristol Bay Times and the Dutch Harbor Fisherman.

In April 2024, the newspaper's staff was informed by management that the paper will reduce the number of print editions from six to two a week. Newsroom staff launched a campaign to unionize in September 2024, and voted two months later 13-4 in favor of unionization. A contract was ratified in March 2026, making the first newsroom in Alaska to have a union contract.

== Pulitzer Prizes ==
The newspaper has won the Pulitzer Prize three times in the Public Service category, in 1976, 1989 and 2020. The 1976 Pulitzer was for its series "Empire: The Alaska Teamsters Story," which disclosed the effect and influence of the Teamsters Union on the state's economy and politics. The Daily News was at that time the smallest daily newspaper and the first in the state to win the Public Service Pulitzer. The 1988 series was "A People in Peril," which documented the high degree of alcoholism, suicide and despair in the Alaska Native population. In 2020, the Daily News again won the Public Service Pulitzer for the paper's "Lawless" series, about the failings of Alaska's criminal justice system, particularly in rural Alaska. The Daily News shared that Pulitzer with ProPublica, with whom the Daily News had collaborated on the series.
