= Henry B. Quinby =

American politician (1846–1924)

Henry Brewer Quinby
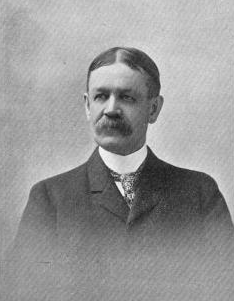

52nd Governor of New Hampshire
- In office January 7, 1909 – January 5, 1911
- Preceded by: Charles M. Floyd
- Succeeded by: Robert P. Bass

Member of the Executive Council of New Hampshire
- In office 1891–1892

Member of the New Hampshire Senate
- In office 1889–1890

Member of the New Hampshire House of Representatives
- In office 1887–1888

Personal details
- Born: June 10, 1846 Biddeford, Maine, U.S.
- Died: February 8, 1924 (aged 77) New York, New York, U.S.
- Party: Republican
- Spouse: Octavia M. Cole
- Children: Henry Cole Quinby; Candace Ellen Quinby
- Education: Bowdoin College, A.B., 1869; Bowdoin College, A.M., 1872; National Medical College, 1880
- Profession: Physician; Businessman; Politician

Henry Brewer Quinby (June 10, 1846 – February 8, 1924) was an American physician, businessman, and Republican politician in the U.S. state of New Hampshire. He was the 52nd governor of New Hampshire from 1909 to 1911 and served in the New Hampshire House of Representatives and the New Hampshire Senate.

== Early life ==
Quinby was born in Biddeford, Maine to Thomas and Jane E. (Brewer) Quinby. He earned a bachelor's degree from Bowdoin College in 1869 and an A.M. degree from Bowdoin in 1872. In 1880, he graduated from the National Medical College in Washington, D.C.

== Political career ==
He served in the New Hampshire House of Representatives from 1887 to 1888 and in the New Hampshire Senate from 1889 to 1890. He was on the New Hampshire Executive Council in 1891 and 1892. In 1893, he was a delegate to the Republican National Convention. Quinby was chairman of the 1896 State Republican Convention.

He was elected as a Republican candidate to the office of governor in 1908. After leaving office, he retired from politics.

He died in 1924 in New York City.

== Personal life ==
On June 22, 1870, Quinby married Octavia M. Cole and they had two children, Henry Cole Quinby and Candace Ellen Quinby.

Party political offices
Preceded by Charles M. Floyd	Republican nominee for Governor of New Hampshire; 1908	Succeeded by Robert P. Bass
Political offices
Preceded by Charles M. Floyd	Governor of New Hampshire; 1909–1911	Succeeded by Robert P. Bass
