= Ted Field =

American media mogul (born 1953)

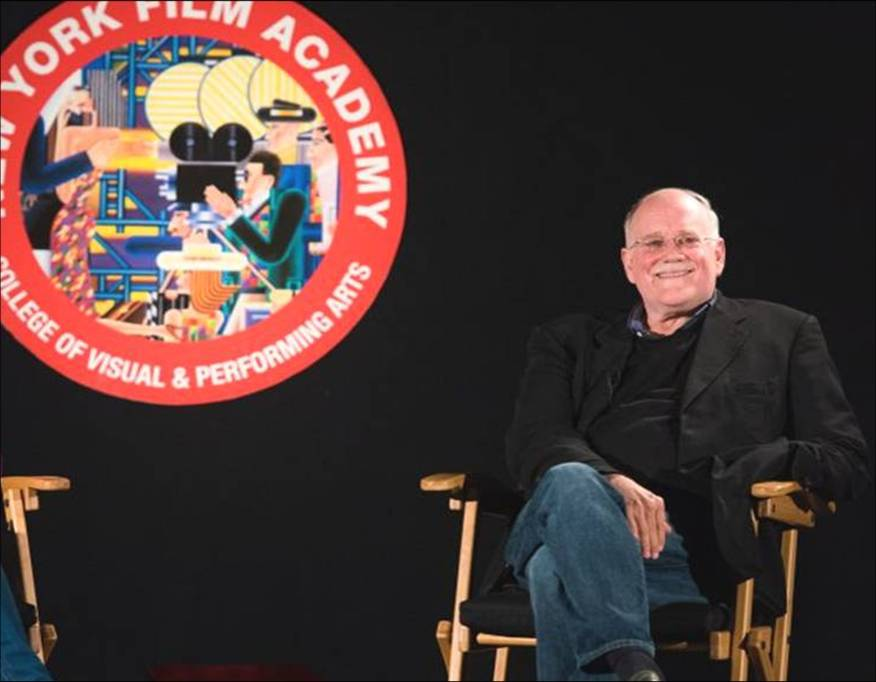
- Ted Field discussing filmmaking at New York Film Academy
- Born: Frederick Woodruff Field; June 1, 1953 (age 73); Chicago, Illinois, U.S.
- Education: Pomona College
- Known for: Interscope Communications; Radar Pictures
- Spouse(s): Judy Field (first marriage); Barbara Field (second marriage); Susan Bari Bollman Field (third marriage)
- Children: 8
- Parent(s): Marshall Field IV; Katherine Woodruff Field (later Fanning)

Frederick Woodruff "Ted" Field (born June 1, 1953) is an American media mogul, record executive, entrepreneur and film producer.

He founded Interscope Communications to develop and produce films in 1982, and produced his first hit, Revenge of the Nerds, the same year. Seven years later, he co-founded Interscope Records with Jimmy Iovine in 1989.

He is an heir of the Marshall Field family.

== Early life ==
Field was born on June 1, 1953, in Chicago, Illinois, the son of Marshall Field IV, who owned the Chicago Sun-Times from 1956 to 1965, and Katherine Woodruff Fanning, who was later an editor of several newspapers.

Field's parents divorced when he was young. Field's mother then married Larry Fanning, who became Field's stepfather. Field, his sisters, his mother and his stepfather moved to Anchorage, Alaska. Field's mother and Larry Fanning purchased the Anchorage Daily News from founder Norman C. Brown in 1967. Larry Fanning died in 1971: Kay Fanning continued to operate the paper until 1979 when she sold it to The McClatchy Company. She remained as publisher until 1983.

Field attended Pomona College in Claremont, California, graduating in 1979.

== Career ==
=== Interscope Racing ===
Field's Interscope Racing started off entering Danny Ongais in Formula 5000 in 1975, graduating to USAC racing and the Indianapolis 500 in Parnelli chassis. Field also funded Ongais to make occasional Formula One outings in a Penske during the 1977 season.

Field also backed the construction in 1980 of an Interscope chassis designed by Roman Slobodynskyj for the Indianapolis 500. This was intended to take a turbocharged six-cylinder Porsche engine (similar to the one Ongais and Field were using in their Porsche 935) but a dispute with USAC over turbo boost meant the program was abandoned. The car was eventually fitted with a conventional Ford Cosworth DFX engine and entered in the 1981 500. Ongais led the race but crashed and was critically injured. In 1982 a recovered Ongais gave the car one last start at Indy but that too ended with an accident.

=== Interscope Communications ===
In 1982, Field founded Interscope Communications, which produced more than 50 major films. In 1984, Field was a leader of a group that bought movie camera manufacturer Panavision. In 1987, Panavision was sold to Lee International.

In 1992, PolyGram bought a controlling interest in the film label. In December 1998, Seagram acquired PolyGram, merging its film division with Universal Pictures. As a result, Interscope Communications, October Films and Gramercy Pictures were sold off to Barry Diller, who owned HSN, which in turn, had a major stake in USA Networks. In 1999, the three labels were merged to become USA Films. In 2001, Universal Pictures bought USA from Diller and in 2002, combined USA Films, Universal Focus and Good Machine Releasing to become Focus Features.

=== Interscope Records ===
In 1989, he and record executive Jimmy Iovine co-founded Interscope Records. The label sustained a distribution deal with Atlantic Records, but in 1995, became a free agent following controversy surrounding Interscope's signage of gangster rappers including Dr. Dre and Suge Knight's Death Row Records. The label was shortly bought by MCA Inc. for $200 million. In 1996, following a sale to Seagram by Matsushita Electric (parent company of Panasonic), MCA was rebranded as Universal Pictures, and its MCA Music Entertainment faction was renamed Universal Music Group. Then, in December 1998, Seagram acquired PolyGram and merged its music division of labels with Universal Music Group, resulting in Interscope, on January 1, 1999, being merged into Geffen Records and A&M Records to become Interscope Geffen A&M Records. He and Iovine were co-chairmen of IGA.

After leaving Interscope in February 2001, he and Marc Geiger formed Artistdirect Records with the backing of BMG's RCA Records. The label folded in 2003.

=== Radar Pictures ===
Since forming the company in late 2000, Field is currently chairman and CEO of Radar Pictures. The company initially used Interscope's library for the company's development slate.

Field and Radar Pictures have faced legal action in years between 2007 and 2019 over allegations of fraudulent misconduct. In December 2016, Field and his company assigned profits from then-upcoming Jumanji: Welcome to the Jungle (2017), to Filmula Entertainment, to satisfy a breach-of-contract over the unsuccessful reboot of Trauma Records.

== Personal life ==
From 1984 to 1998, he owned a mansion formerly owned by Howard B. Keck located at 1244 Moraga Drive in the gated community of Moraga Estates in Bel Air, California. From 1986 through 1993, Field owned the Harold Lloyd Estate (also known as Green Acres) in Beverly Hills, California. Field is a tournament chess player who sponsored the 1990 World Chess Championship in NYC between Garry Kasparov and Anatoly Karpov. He is currently developing a movie about former world chess champion Magnus Carlsen.

== Racing record ==
=== 24 Hours of Le Mans results ===
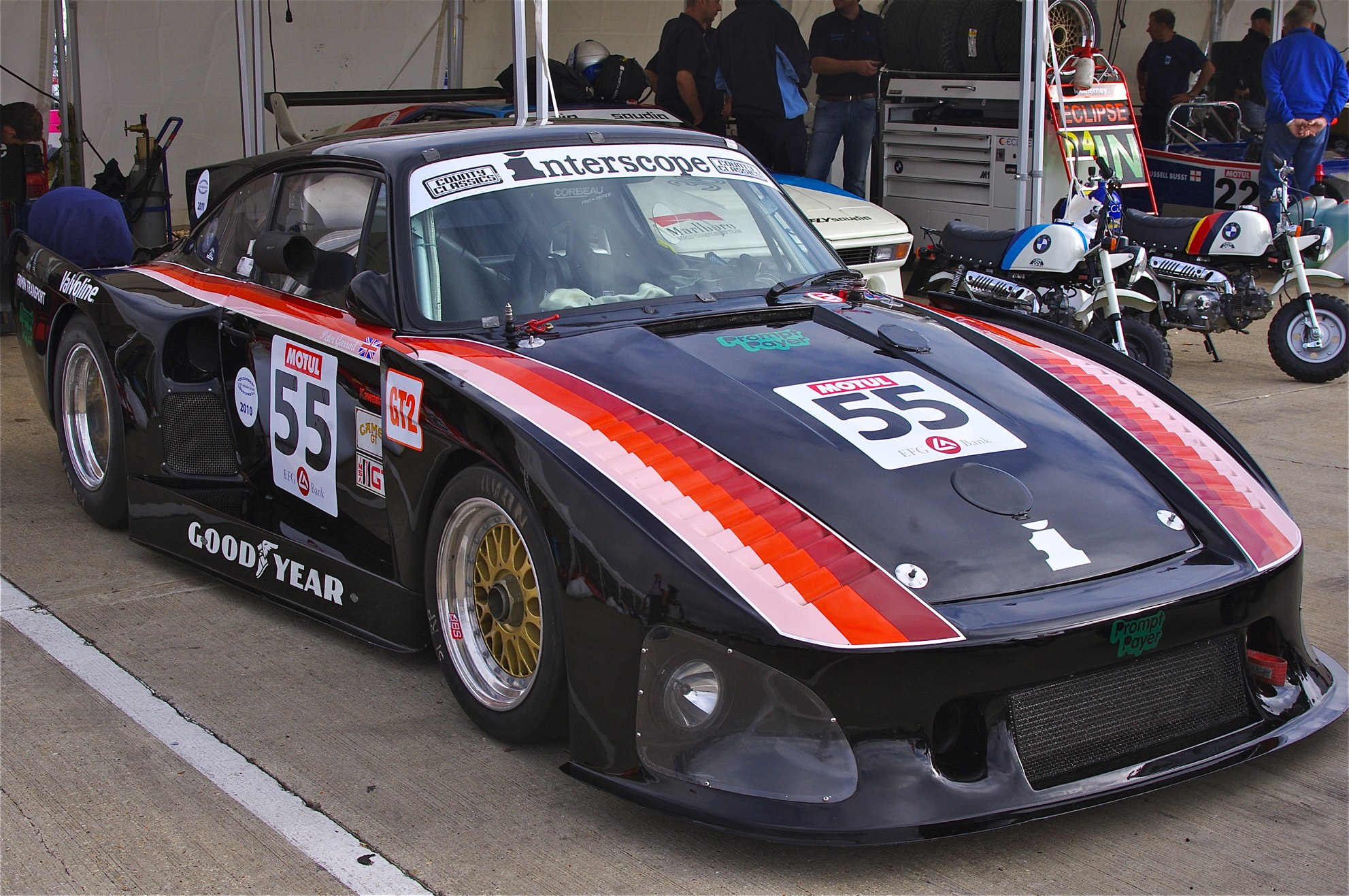
A Porsche 935 in Interscope Racing's livery

Year	Team	Co-Drivers	Car	Class	Laps	Pos.	Class Pos.
1979	(United States) Interscope Racing	(United States) Milt Minter (United States) John Morton	Porsche 935/79	IMSA; GTX	154	DNF	DNF
1980	(Germany) Kremer Racing (Germany) Team Malardeau	(France) Jean-Louis Lafosse (United States) Danny Ongais	Porsche 935-K3/80	Gr.5; SP 2.0+	89	DNF	DNF
1981	(Germany) Porsche Kremer Racing (United States) Interscope Racing	(United States) Bill Whittington (United States) Don Whittington	Porsche 935-K3/81	Gr.5; SP 2.0+	57	DNF	DNF
1982	(Germany) Kremer Racing (United States) Interscope Racing	(United States) Danny Ongais (United States) Bill Whittington	Porsche Kremer C-K5	Gr.C	25	DNF	DNF

== Filmography (producer) ==
He was a producer in all films unless otherwise noted.

=== Film ===
Year	Film	Credit
1984	Revenge of the Nerds	
1985	Turk 182	
1987	Critical Condition	
1987	Outrageous Fortune	
1987	Revenge of the Nerds II: Nerds in Paradise	
1987	Three Men and a Baby	
1988	The Seventh Sign	
1988	Cocktail	
1989	Bill & Ted's Excellent Adventure	Executive producer
1989	Collision Course	
1989	Renegades	Executive producer
1989	An Innocent Man	
1990	The First Power	Executive producer
1990	Bird on a Wire	Executive producer
1990	Arachnophobia	Co-executive producer
1990	Three Men and a Little Lady	
1991	Class Action	
1991	Bill & Ted's Bogus Journey	Executive producer
1991	Paradise	Executive producer
1992	The Hand That Rocks the Cradle	Executive producer
1992	The Cutting Edge	
1992	FernGully: The Last Rainforest	Executive producer
1992	Jersey Girl	Executive producer
1992	The Gun in Betty Lou's Handbag	Executive producer
1992	Out on a Limb	Executive producer
1994	The Air Up There	
1994	Terminal Velocity	Executive producer
1994	Imaginary Crimes	Executive producer
1995	Roommates	
1995	Separate Lives	Executive producer
1995	Operation Dumbo Drop	Executive producer
1995	The Tie That Binds	Executive producer
1995	Two Much	Executive producer
1995	Jumanji	Executive producer
1995	Mr. Holland's Opus	
1996	The Arrival	Executive producer
1996	Boys	Executive producer
1996	Kazaam	Executive producer
1996	The Associate	Executive producer
1997	Gridlock'd	Executive producer
1997	Snow White: A Tale of Terror	Executive producer
1998	The Proposition	
1998	Very Bad Things	Executive producer
1998	What Dreams May Come	Executive producer
1999	Runaway Bride	
1999	Teaching Mrs. Tingle	Executive producer
2000	Pitch Black	Executive producer
2002	They	Executive producer
2003	How to Deal	Executive producer
2003	Le Divorce	Executive producer
2003	The Texas Chainsaw Massacre	Executive producer
2003	The Last Samurai	Executive producer
2004	The Chronicles of Riddick	Executive producer
2005	The Amityville Horror	Executive producer
2005	Zathura: A Space Adventure	Executive producer
2006	Waist Deep	Executive producer
2007	The Heartbreak Kid	
2008	Swing Vote	Executive producer
2009	Horsemen	Executive producer
2009	All About Steve	Executive producer
2009	The Invention of Lying	Executive producer
2009	The Box	Executive producer
2009	Everybody's Fine	
2010	Twelve	
2012	Spring Breakers	Executive producer
2013	Riddick	
2014	Acid Girls	Executive producer
2016	Kickboxer: Vengeance	
2017	Jumanji: Welcome to the Jungle	Executive producer
2018	Beirut	
2019	Jumanji: The Next Level	Executive producer

Thanks

Year	Film	Role
1990	The Man Inside	Special thanks
2001	Kissing Jessica Stein	Special thanks
2009	Veronika Decides to Die	The production would like to thank

=== Television ===
Year	Title	Credit	Notes
1986	American Geisha	Executive producer	Television film
1987	The Real Adventures of Sherlock Jones and Proctor Watson		
1987	Murder Ordained	Executive producer	Television film
1987	The Father Clements Story	Executive producer	Television film
1988	Crossing the Mob	Executive producer	Television film
1989	My Boyfriend's Back	Executive producer	Television film
1989	A Mother's Courage: The Mary Thomas Story	Executive producer	Television film
1990	The Secret Life of Archie's Wife	Executive producer	Television film
1993	Foreign Affairs	Executive producer	Television film
1995	Body Language	Executive producer	Television film
1997	Snow White: A Tale of Terror	Executive producer	Television film
2000	Into Pitch Black	Co-executive producer	Television special
2015	Winter Dragon	Executive producer	Television pilot
2017	Under the Bed		Television film
2018	Lead		
2021	The Wheel of Time	Co-executive producer Executive producer	
TBD	The Last Herald-Mage	Executive producer	

As an actor

Year	Title	Role
1983	Saturday Supercade	Tex Toadwalker

== See also ==
- Madsen, Axel. The Marshall Fields: The Evolution of an American Business Dynasty. Wiley: 2002.
