= Brands Hatch =

Race track in West Kingsdown, Kent, England

- Logo since January 2004

- Grand Prix Circuit (2003–present)

- Indy Circuit (2003–present)
- Location: West Kingsdown, Kent, England
- Coordinates: 51°21′24″N 0°15′45″E
- Capacity: 40,000
- FIA Grade: 2 (both layouts)
- Owner: MotorSport Vision (January 2004–present)
- Opened: 1950
- Major events: Current: GT World Challenge Europe (2014–2019, 2021–present); NASCAR Euro Series (2012–2019, 2021–present); BSB (1991–present); BTCC (1958–present); British GT (1993–1997, 1999–2004, 2006–present); TCR UK (2018–2019, 2021–present); Formula Ford Festival (1976–present); F4 British Championship (2015–present); Future: Formula E London ePrix (2027); TCR World Tour (2027); Former: Formula One; British Grand Prix (Intermittently 1964–1986); European Grand Prix (1983, 1985); World Touring Car Championship; Race of UK (2006–2010); Champ Car London Champ Car Trophy (1978, 2003); World SBK (1993, 1995–2008); A1GP (2005, 2007–2009); DTM (2006–2013, 2018–2019); W Series (2019); World Sportscar Championship (1967–1972, 1974, 1977, 1979–1982, 1984–1989); FIM Endurance World Championship (1966–1968, 1978–1979, 2001); Sidecar World Championship (1999–2003, 2005, 2007, 2015); 2012 Summer Paralympics
- Website: https://www.brandshatch.co.uk/

Grand Prix Circuit (2003–present)
- Length: 3.916 km (2.433 mi)
- Turns: 9
- Race lap record: 1:12.276 ( (Republic of Ireland) Adam Carroll, A1GP Ferrari, 2009, A1GP)

Indy Circuit (2003–present)
- Length: 1.944 km (1.208 mi)
- Turns: 6
- Race lap record: 0:38.032 ( (United Kingdom) Scott Mansell, Benetton B197 Judd, 2004, EuroBOSS/F1)

Grand Prix Circuit (1999–2002)
- Length: 4.221 km (2.623 mi)
- Turns: 11
- Race lap record: 1:16.170 ( (United Kingdom) Tony Worswick, Jordan 194 Judd, 2001, EuroBOSS/F1)

Grand Prix Circuit (1988–1998)
- Length: 4.182 km (2.599 mi)
- Turns: 11
- Race lap record: 1:13.860 ( (Italy) Emanuele Naspetti, Reynard 91D, 1991, F3000)

Indy Circuit (1976–1998)
- Length: 1.938 km (1.204 mi)
- Turns: 6
- Race lap record: 0:38.760 ( (Brazil) Luiz Garcia Jr., Reynard 95D, 1996, F3000)

Grand Prix Circuit (1976–1987)
- Length: 4.207 km (2.614 mi)
- Turns: 9
- Race lap record: 1:09.593 ( (United Kingdom) Nigel Mansell, Williams FW11, 1986, F1)

Grand Prix Circuit (1960–1975)
- Length: 4.265 km (2.650 mi)
- Turns: 9
- Race lap record: 1:21.100 ( (Austria) Niki Lauda, Ferrari 312B3, 1974, F1)

Club Circuit (1954–1975)
- Length: 1.995 km (1.240 mi)
- Turns: 5
- Race lap record: 0:49.600 ( (United Kingdom) Alan Fowler, Mercury 3-Ford, 1972, Group 5)

Original Circuit (1950–1953)
- Length: 1.609 km (1.000 mi)
- Turns: 4

Brands Hatch is a motor racing circuit in West Kingsdown, Kent, England. Originally used as a grasstrack motorcycle circuit on farmland, it hosted 12 runnings of the British Grand Prix between 1964 and 1986 and currently hosts many British and International racing events. The venue is owned and operated by Jonathan Palmer's MotorSport Vision organisation.

== Circuit ==
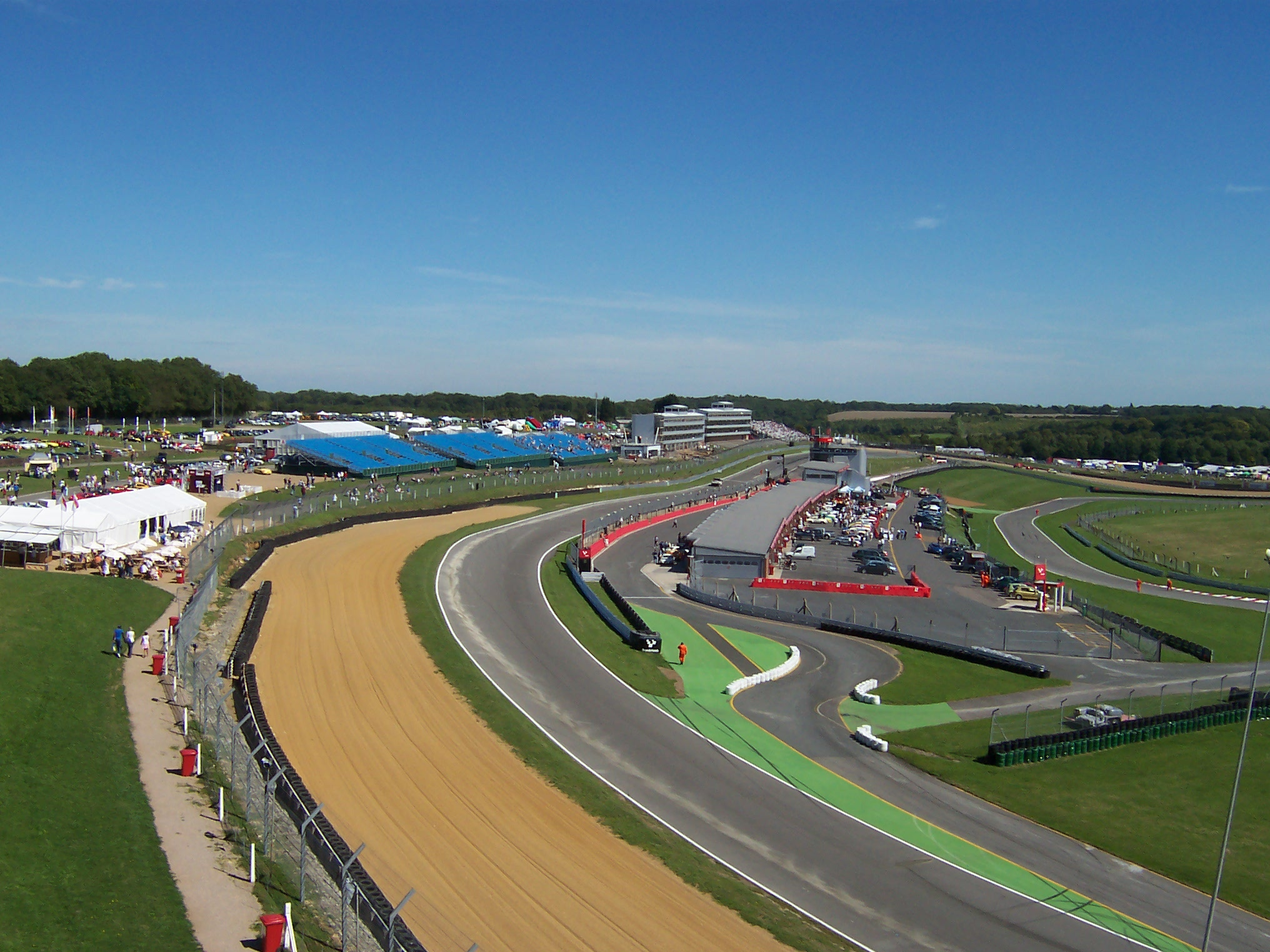
View of Brabham Straight and the pits from above Clark Curve

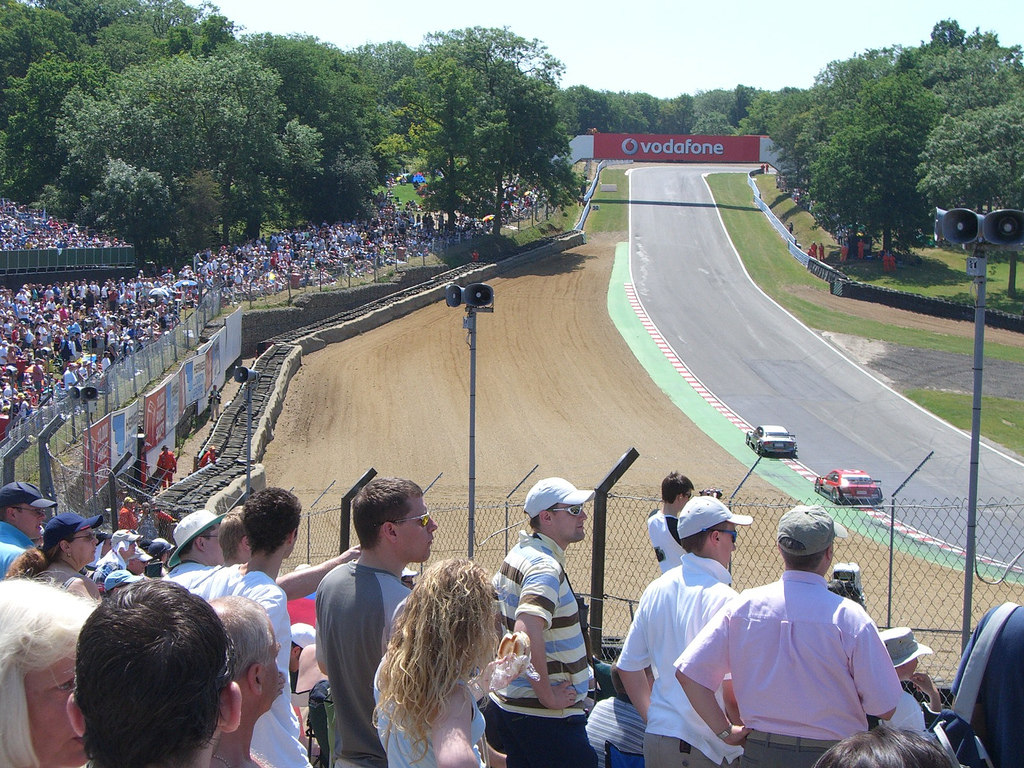
The view from the top of Paddock Hill Bend towards Druids hairpin taken at a DTM race in July 2006

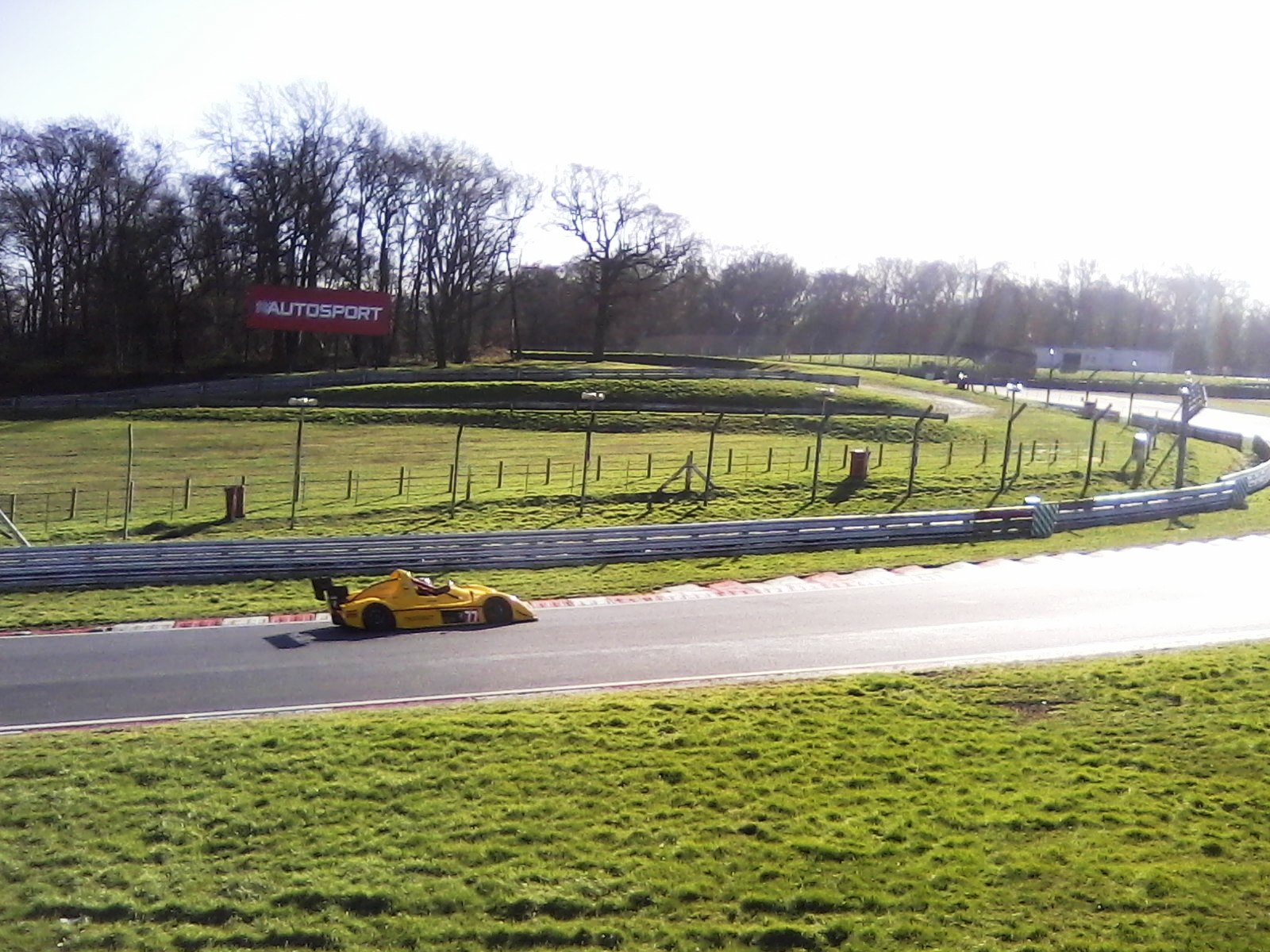
General Testing at Brands Hatch, at the end of the Cooper (back) Straight

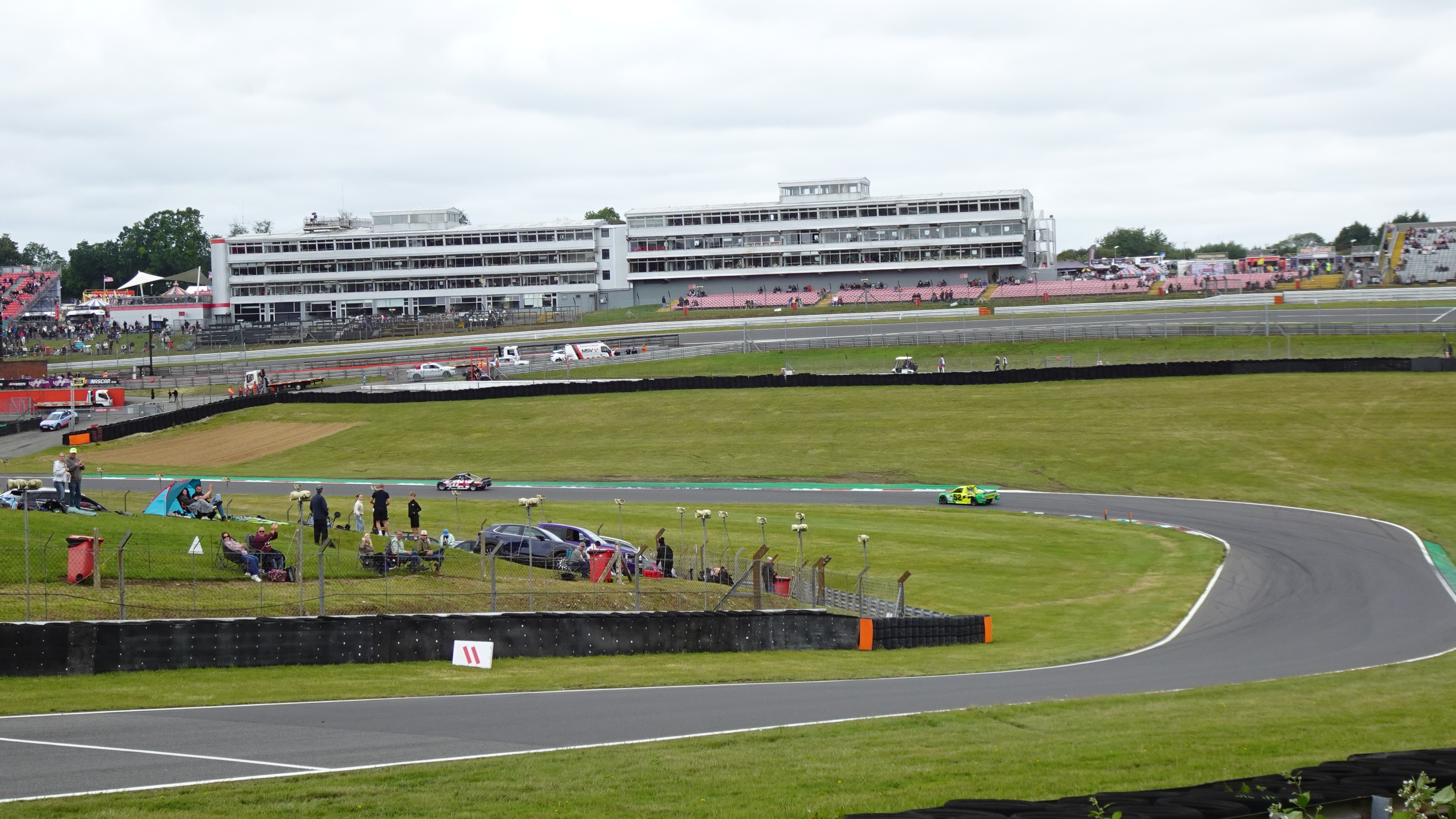
The view from Druids looking down to Graham Hill Bend

Brands Hatch offers two layout configurations. The 1.198 mi (1.928 km) "Indy Circuit" layout is located entirely within a natural amphitheatre offering spectators views of almost all of the shorter configurations from wherever they watch. The 2.433 mi (3.916 km) "Grand Prix" layout has played host to several Formula One Grands Prix, including those with moments such as Jo Siffert's duel with Chris Amon in 1968 and 1992 World Driver's Champion Nigel Mansell's first win in 1985. Noise restrictions and the proximity of the Grand Prix loop to local residents mean that the number of race meetings held on the extended circuit is limited to just a few per year (usually for higher-profile series such as the BTCC and the BSB).

The full Grand Prix circuit begins on the Brabham Straight, an off-camber, slightly curved stretch, before plunging into the right-hander at Paddock Hill Bend, with gradients of 8%. Despite the difficulty of the curve, due to the straight that precedes it, it is one of the track's few overtaking spots. The next corner, Druids, is a hairpin bend, taken after an uphill braking zone at Hailwood Hill. The track then curves around the south bank spectator area into the downhill, off-camber Graham Hill Bend, and another, slightly bent stretch at the Cooper Straight, which runs parallel to the pit lane. After the straight, the circuit climbs uphill though the decreasing-radius Surtees turn, before moving onto the back straight where the track's top speeds can be reached. The most significant elevation changes on the circuit occur here at Pilgrim's Drop and Hawthorn Hill, which leads into Hawthorn Bend (with some parts approaching 7%). The track then loops around the woodland with a series of mid-speed corners, most notably the dip at Westfield and Dingle Dell and the blind Sheene curve. From there the track then emerges from the left hand and cambered Stirlings Bend onto the short straight to Clearways and rejoins the Indy Circuit for Clark Curve with its uphill off-camber approach to the pit straight and the start/finish line.

The British Rallycross Circuit at Brands Hatch was designed and constructed by Trevor Hopkins, a four-times British Rallycross Champion. Completed around 1981, the circuit spans approximately 0.9 mi (1.4 km). A notable feature is the starting point on the startline, followed by a right turn and descent on loose terrain at Paddock Hill Bend. After navigating the left-right Esses at the bottom, the circuit rejoins the Indy Circuit, leading up and around Druids hairpin. A 90-degree left turn through Langley's Gap and across the knife-edge connects back to the Indy Circuit, but in an anti-clockwise direction. Subsequently, cars proceed from Cooper Straight, swooping up the old link road and returning to Paddock.

== History ==
=== Origins – 1940s ===
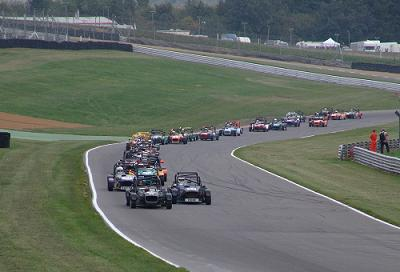
Formula Locost racing down the Cooper Straight

Brands Hatch was originally the name of a natural grassy hollow that was shaped like an amphitheatre. Although the site was originally used as a military training ground, the fields belonging to Brands Farm were first used as a circuit by a group of Gravesend cyclists led by Ron Argent, with the permission of the local farmer and landowner, Harry White. Using the natural contours of the land, many cyclists from around London practised, raced and ran time trials on the dirt roads carved out by farm machinery. The first actual race on the circuit was held in 1926, over 4 mi (6.4 km) between cyclists and cross-country runners. Within a few years, motorcyclists were using the circuit, laying out a three-quarter-mile anti-clockwise track in the valley. They also saw the advantage of competing in a natural arena just a few hundred yards from the A20, and with the passage of time, a kidney-shaped circuit came into use. The first motorcycle races were "very informal" with much of the organisation being done on the spot. Initially, the racing was on a straight strip approximately where Cooper Straight came to be when the track was tarmacked. Brands Hatch remained in operation during the 1930s, but after being used as a military vehicle park and being subject to many bombing raids during World War II, it needed much work before it could become a professional racing circuit.

In 1932, four local motorcycling clubs joined forces (Bermondsey, Owls, Sidcup and West Kingsdown) and staged their first meeting that March.

Motorcycle racing quickly resumed after World War II and in 1947, Joe Francis (managing director of Brands Hatch Stadium Ltd.) persuaded the BBC to televise a grass track meeting, the first motorcycle event to be televised on British TV.

=== 1950s ===
Brands Hatch circuit as it was when it was first tarmacked. Note that the circuit direction is anticlockwise.

Following World War II, cinders were laid on the track of what was by then known as Brands Hatch Stadium and motorcycle racing continued. That was until 1950 when the 500 Club managed to persuade Joe Francis, that the future for his stadium lay in car and motorcycle road racing. The group behind 500 c.c. single-seater racing cars was the 500 Club and it, together with the owners, invested the sum of £17,000 on a tarmac surface.

Thus Brands Hatch was born as a motor racing venue, and on 16 April 1950, the opening meeting was scheduled for the first purpose-built post-war racing circuit in England, approval having been given by the RAC following a demonstration by a handful of 500s in February. Amongst those giving the demonstration was a very young Stirling Moss. The Half-Litre Car Club for 500cc Formula 3 organised that first race on 16 April, with 7,000 spectators coming to witness these cars complete in 10 races. Don Parker won the first race. Before the year was out, five meetings had been held, with the events running to a similar programme. The June meeting was a Moss benefit for he won all five races he entered in the Works Cooper and set a new lap record. The August Bank Holiday meeting saw for the first time, involvement of the national press with the Daily Telegraph sponsoring the main event of the day. The old cinder track had been 0.75 mi (1.21 km) in length, but the tarmac circuit was lengthened to 1.000 mi (1.609 km) and now ran anticlockwise. The Maidstone & Mid-Kent Motor Club invited a number of sports car drivers to test the circuit on 5 November, this being the first time that any car other than a 500cc had used it, and they ran clockwise.

In 1951, season included seven car meetings, all for Formula 3 and they were again organised the Half-Litre Car Club to which the 500 Club had changed its name since becoming a Limited Company. In February, the Aston Martin Owners Club tested some 1.5-litre sports cars at Brands Hatch preparatory to the full International season starting.

The 1952 season saw the emergence of Stuart Lewis-Evans. Les Leston raised the lap record to 71.15 mph (114.50 km/h) (50.6sec) – the first time that 70 mph (110 km/h) had been exceeded.

1953 saw the introductions of raised spectator protection banks. This was to be Parker's year for he won the Autosport Formula 3 Championship taking seven races at Brands on his way the title. Some 50,000 people packed into the Daily Telegraph International and as the season came to an end Parker raised the lap record to 74.38 mph (119.70 km/h) (48.4secs). During 1953, the Universal Motor Racing Club was established, with a racing school set up at Brands Hatch. The Half Litre Club, later to become the British Racing and Sports Car Club (BRSCC), ran many races throughout the 1950s and firmly established the venue as one of Britain's top racing circuits.

Brands Hatch, as it was following the construction of the Druids Hill Bend hairpin

The track continued to expand during 1953 and 1954, with the addition of Druids Bend by lengthening the circuit, a pit lane and spectator banks and reversing the racing direction to clockwise. While Formula III racing was unquestionably close and exciting, it did have its limitations and now the paying public wanted some variety and more powerful cars to watch. The change in direction of racing traffic resulted in the creation of Paddock Hill Bend a fast sweeping downhill right-hander. At the bottom the Paddock Hill, a quarter-mile extension to the circuit was added which took the competitors up the other side of the valley to a right-hand hairpin, which is called Druids Hill Bend. This new section re-joined the old track at another tricky corner, Bottom Bend, and the result was a circuit lengthened to 1.240 mi (1.996 km).

The first race winner on the revised track was Stuart Lewis-Evans, at the wheel of a Cooper-Norton Mk.8, with a new name at the inaugural meeting. That name was N. G. Hill who was a 'graduate' of the racing school.

As the season progressed larger engine machines began to appear starting with small and medium capacity sport cars, then Formula Libre machines. However, most races were still run for Formula 3 and 1954 saw the first of what was to become the traditional Boxing Day meeting down in Kent. A total of 15,000 spectators arrived at the Christmas meeting to watch a programme of seven races with the added attraction of ox-roasting and Stirling Moss.

It was Jim Russell's year, for he dominated the Formula 3, winning the Autosport National Championship, as well as four of the meeting. Cooper T39s and Lotus Mk.9s dominated sports car racing while Archie Scott Brown had a stranglehold on the over 1,900 cc class, driving either the works Lister-Bristol or Louis Manduca's Jaguar C-Type.

At the August Bank Holiday meeting spectators could avail themselves of the only permanent grandstand at a British motor sport circuit; it had been purchased second-hand from the defunct Northolt pony-trotting stadium and for the 1956 season, a telephone system was installed linking race control, the grandstand and the marshals' posts, while a modern hospital was opened at the circuit, complete with operating theatre.

As larger-capacity cars become more common, 500 cc racing began to decline, but the formula still gave close, exciting racing. The first year that public car race meetings were organised by other than the BRSCC was 1956 – in June, the 750 Motor Club joined forces with the Club Lotus to offer a mixture of races, including, for the first time at Brands, saloon cars. This was also the year the Brands grew up, running Formula One cars for the first time on 14 October. Initially, a long-distance race was planned, but in the end a 15-lap race was run which attracted four work entries from Connaught (B-Types for Archie Scott Brown, Les Leston, Jack Fairman and Stuart Lewis-Evans) opposed by privately entered Maserati 250Fs driven by Roy Salvadori and Bruce Halford and a selection of independents. Archie won from Lewis-Evans, setting a new lap record in the process at a speed of 75.66 mph (121.76 km/h). Politics caused the cancellation of the Boxing Day meeting that year due to the Suez Crisis.

As a result of Suez affair, forecasts for 1957 season were gloomy, but the programme ran as planned, the two feature meeting of the year being run for the new Formula Two on Whit Sunday and August Bank Holiday. The year saw a continued diversification at BRSCC meetings with fewer 500cc events and more sport-racing machinery. The Kentish 100 was the biggest event yet run at the circuit for Formula Two with two 42-lap heats and attracted a truly International field. Formula Two featured at other meetings but at the August Bank Holiday meeting, Formula 3 proved that it was not yet dead as it was run as the feature event for the Daily Telegraph Trophy.

Jim Clark made his Brands Hatch debut at the Boxing Day event, when he drove the Border Reivers-entered Lotus Elite into second place behind Colin Chapman. At the August Bank Holiday meeting in 1958, an 1,100cc sports car became the first to lap Brands Hatch in under a minute. Its creator had been unable to afford to purchase a Lotus, so had designed his own car; the car was called a Lola and its creator was Eric Broadley.

The highlight of the 1959 season was again the Kentish 100, with no less than 40 drivers (including 10 Grand Prix names) fighting for just 16 grid positions. Jack Brabham won both 42-lap heats driving the works Cooper-Climax. The feature race at the Boxing Day meeting was for Formula Junior, a new International Formula for single-seater racing cars using production engines up to 1,100 cc; works entries were received from Elva, Gemini, Lola, Cooper and Lotus. This new formula was to prove the death-knell of 500 cc racing.

=== 1960s ===
The first incarnation of the Grand Prix circuit

In January 1960, Kent County Council gave planning permission for the extension of Brands Hatch – an extension which would double the length of the track offering a choice of long or short circuits. The new 2.650 mi (4.265 km) track used, all of this existing one with the extension of Kidney Bend; South Bank became a long, uphill 160° sweep out into the country and making the approach to Clearways very much faster. From South Bank there followed a long straight dipping into and out of the next valley to the right-hand Hawthorn Bend followed by Portobello Straight to Westfield Bend leading to the dip to Dingle Dell, Dingle Dell Corner and the difficult left-hand Stirling's Bend. A short straight then brought the circuit back to Clearways at much higher speed than hitherto. John Hall said, "For the first time ever, Britain will have a Grand Prix track within 20 miles of London.'"

The new track was planned to be completed in time for the August Bank Holiday meeting and was ready for testing in June. The debut of the new track came in August as planned, with works entries from BRM, Cooper, Ferrari, and Lotus together with independents such Yeoman Credit Racing, Scuderia Eugenio Castellotti and Scuderia Centro Sud. Record traffic jams were reported on the A20, and the huge crowd saw the non-championship Silver City Trophy Formula One race won by Jack Brabham in the works Cooper-Climax by just 4.4 seconds from Graham Hill in the BRM P48, after the gearbox of Jim Clark's Lotus expired after leading 22 laps of the 50-lap race. The fastest lap was set jointly by Clark and Brabham, in 1min 40.6sec, at a speed of 94.82 mph (152.60 km/h).

Clark had his revenge a few weeks later when the circuit saw Formula Two cars performing in the Kentish 100 with a hard-fought win over Dan Gurney; both were driving Lotus-Climaxes, Clark's was a works car and Gurney's a private entry. Soon after, the track was sold to Grovewood Securities Ltd., and John Webb put in charge of Motor Circuit Developments to manage the circuit.

This was the year of the new 1.5-litre Formula One and on 3 June 1961, the Silver City Trophy, was contested over 76 laps of the GP Circuit by Grand Prix cars. Entries were received from Cooper, Lotus, BRM, UDT-Laystall and Yeoman Credit. Victory went to Stirling Moss driving the pale green UDT-Laystall Lotus 18/21 Climax from Jim Clark abroad the works Lotus 21 Climax and Tony Brooks driving the BRM P57 Climax. The 7 August meeting saw the Guards International Trophy for Intercontinental Formula cars. In effect the redundant 2.5-litre F1 cars from pre-1961. The race was a 76-lap affair over the GP Circuit; Jack Brabham won in the works Cooper T53-Climax from Jim Clark (works Lotus 18-Climax) and Graham Hill (BRM P57).

The following year 1962 did not see any major meetings at Brands, but on 1 October, the longest race staged so far took place. This was the Motor-sponsored Six-Hour Saloon race. The field of 35 entries included some foreign entrants and victory went to Mike Parkes and Jimmy Blumer driving a 3.8-litre Jaguar Mk II; the German pairing of Peter Lindner and Peter Nöcker in another Jaguar from a Mini-Cooper driven by John Alvy and Denny Hulme, a New Zealand mechanic employed by Jack Brabham.

The Club Circuit had six meeting during 1962, and witnessed the coming of Formula Junior. At the Easter Monday meeting, a Formula Junior race saw the lap record tumble to 55.6secs and the first-ever 80 mph lap (actual speed was 80.29 mph (129.21 km/h)) by John Fenning, aboard a Lotus 20-Ford. The 'Trio' meeting in July saw the end of an era when a 500 took the chequered flag for the last time with Mike Ledbrook, driving a Cooper-Norton Mark 8 in the 500 and 250cc race. At the Boxing Day meeting, Hulme won the Formula Junior race driving the prototype Brabham BT6-Ford, setting a new outright lap record of 54.8secs at an average speed of 82.06 mph (132.06 km/h).

The severe winter of 1962/63 caused the cancellation of most sports, which resulted in empty television screens on occasions. The lack of sport to show virtually created Rallycross, for on 9 February a rallycross-type event was staged on the slushy Brands Hatch car parks in front of the TV cameras (not the Rallycross Circuit used in the 1980s and 1990s). The event had been quickly organised by Raymond Baxter of the BBC and the London Motor Club, and saw Timo Mäkinen win easily in the works Austin-Healey 3000.

The second Motor-sponsored Six-Hour saloon car race, was a round of the inaugural European Touring Car Challenge. It was run in appalling conditions on 6 July. The large crowd witness the favourite, a 7-litre Ford Galaxie driven by Dan Gurney and Jack Brabham, floundering in the wet and the Jaguar dominated the race. Victory went to Roy Salvadori and Denny Hulme from Peter Linder and Peter Nöcker after the winners on the road, Mike Salmon and Pete Sutcliffe being disqualified for engine irregularities. The Guards Trophy was run for sports cars and went to Roger Penske driving his Zerex Special, which was based on a Cooper F1 chassis.

The British Grand Prix came to Kent in 1964 and was to be shared with Silverstone in alternate years until 1986. Also the race was given the courtesy title European Grand Prix and the management rose to the occasion. The date was 11 July, a cool and dry day which saw Jim Clark at his best in the Lotus 25 winning by 2.8secs from Graham Hill in the BRM P261, who was followed home by John Surtees in the V8 Ferrari 158; fourth and one lap down was Jack Brabham driving a car bearing his own name. A further lap down in fifth place was Lorenzo Bandini in the V6 Ferrari with Phil Hill taking the final World Championship point in a Cooper. The race average was 94.14 mph (151.50 km/h) and Clark set the fastest lap at 1min 38.8secs (96.5 mph (155.3 km/h)). The Motor Six Hours had its third and final running on 6 June (still a round of the ETCC), with victory going to the Alan Mann-entered Lotus-Cortinas of Sir John Whitmore/Peter Proctor and Henry Taylor/Peter Harper.

The 1964 season was the busiest so far for Brands Hatch, with 14 car race meeting alone; the British Automobile Racing Club (BARC) organised its first meeting in Kent, while the London Motor Car Club organised one in June. The year's Guards Trophy went to Bruce McLaren driving for Cooper in a 3.9-litre Oldsmobile-powered sports car.

During the Lombank Trophy Race of 27 December 1965, held at Brands Hatch, driver George Reid Crossman was killed during the last race of the Formula 3 season. [race day program]

With the Grand Prix not due back at Brands until 1966, they promoted a non-championship Formula One race to be known as Race of Champions sponsored by Daily Mail. The race was run in two 40-lap heats with victory going to Jim Clark (Lotus 33), while his teammate Mike Spence, won the second and taking the overall victory. The first 100 mph lap was set by Clark in 1min 35.4secs. The longest race ever run at the Kentish Circuit took place on 22/23 May, this being the Guards 1000 consisting of two 500-mile races for production saloon cars. The overall winner was the works MG MGB of John Rhodes and Warwick Banks.

The British Grand Prix returned in 1966, the inaugural year of the 3-litre Formula One. The works Brabham-Repco BT19 were first and second in the hands of Jack Brabham and Denny Hulme; Brabham completed the 212-mile race in 2hrs 13mins 13.4secs (95.49 mph (153.68 km/h)) lapping everyone except Hulme in the process. Third was Graham Hill in the BRM P261 from Jim Clark (Lotus 33) with Jochen Rindt fifth in the Cooper-Maserati and in sixth position, a further lap adrift, was Bruce McLaren in the McLaren-Serenissima. The event was notable for the only F1 appearance of the Shannon SH 1 in the hands of Trevor Taylor which lasted just one lap. This was also the year that John Surtees won the Guards Trophy on August Bank Holiday Monday driving the 6-litre Lola T70. The Motor Show 200 for Formula Two cars saw a young Austrian named Jochen Rindt win in the Roy Winkelmann-entered Brabham BT18.

The 1967 Race of Champions (still sponsored by Daily Mail) saw the first of two major victories by American cars at Brands when Dan Gurney brought the Eagle-Weslake T1G over the line first by 0.8 seconds from Lorenzo Bandin's Ferrari 312/67. So good was the public's response to the race (run in two 10-lap heats and a 40-lap final) that John Webb decided to make the race an annual event. The other great American victory was to come when the be-winged 7-litre Chaparral 2F-Chevrolet driven by Phil Hill and Mike Spence won the BOAC 500 run over 211 laps of the Grand Prix Circuit at an average speed of 93.08 mph (149.80 km/h), from the Ferrari 330-P4 of Chris Amon and Jackie Stewart. These two had lapped the rest of the field twice, third place going to the Jo Siffert/Bruce McLaren Porsche 910. The year saw many firsts; in July, Tetsu Ikuzawa became the first Japanese ever to win a race in Britain, the first Mini Festival was run at Whitsun and the Mini-Seven Club ran the first ever all-saloon car meeting in February. But the biggest 'first 'was the arrival of Formula Ford which was to become the providing ground and starting place for so many drivers. The first Formula Ford race was run on 7 July and was won by Roy Allan in a Lotus 51.

1968 proved to be a busy season, with no less than five International meetings; the first was the Race of Champions followed by the BOAC 500, the British Grand Prix, the Guards Trophy, and the Motor Show 200. The former race gave the McLaren marque its maiden Formula One victory when Bruce, driving his own car, led home the field ahead of Pedro Rodríguez in the BRM P133 and his new team-mate, Denny Hulme. Sponsorship on racing cars was just beginning and a television executive was distressed by the 'sailor man' on the side of the Gold Leaf Team Lotus and threatened to withdraw television coverage if the offering item was not obscured, so Graham Hill was black-flagged to have the decal covered!

It was March 1968 at a minor club meeting when 17-year-old rider Barry Sheene lined up on the starting grid, on a works 125cc Bultaco, for his first race. Sheene had worked his way up to second place and threatening the leader, Mike Lewis, when the bike seized and spat its rider off over the handlebars. He achieved a rostrum position in the day's 250cc race. Just one week later, and again at Brands, Sheene took his first race win by 12 seconds. Later, he dominated a field of 350cc machines, riding special 250cc Bultaco with an enlarged 280cc capacity.

The Manufacturers' World Championship came to Brands in early 1968, followed by the BOAC 500 on 7 April. The winner was the Ford GT40 Mk.1 of Jacky Ickx and Brian Redman from the Porsche 908 of Gerhard Mitter and Ludovico Scarfiotti, these two being the only cars to complete the full race distance of 218-laps. Two laps further down in third was another 907 driven by Vic Elford and Jochen Neerpasch and fourth place went to another GT40, driven by Paul Hawkins and David Hobbs.

Three months later came the British Grand Prix on 20 July, won by Jo "Seppi" Siffert. Siffert's victory was noteworthy in that he won in a Lotus 49B which was delivered new to the circuit on the first morning of the meeting. It was completed in the paddock and was entered by the Walker-Durlacher team – a private entrant winning a Grand Prix. In second place just 4.4 secs behind was Chris Amon (Ferrari), with his teammate Jacky Ickx third. Fourth was Denny Hulme in a McLaren M7A, from Surtees in the Honda RA300 one lap down, and Jackie Stewart a further lap down in the Matra-Ford MS80.

Easter Monday 1969 saw another brainchild of John Webb and the BRSCC's Competitions Director Nick Syreett come to fruition. This was Formula 5000 which was based upon the American Formula A, the cars being single-seater chassis powered by American V8 and V6 stock-block engines of up to 5-litre capacity. The need for the new formula was caused by the escalating costs of Formula Three, Formula Two and the decreasing number of non-championship Formula One events as more and more countries demanded a Grand Prix. The winner of the first Formula 5000 race was Peter Gethin driving a McLaren M10A with Chevrolet power.

Indianapolis-style single-car qualifying was introduced for the 1969 Race of Champions, but it simply did not catch on – perhaps it did not have the glamour of the Indy 500; Jackie Stewart won the race in the Matra MS80 owned by Ken Tyrrell and went on to win his first World Championship with it.

The BOAC 500 was once again the British round of the Manufacturers' World Championship and was a Porsche benefit, 908s taking the first three places, the winners being Jo Siffert and Brian Redman; the second place car of Vic Elford and Richard Attwood was two laps behind, with Gerhard Mitter and Udo Schütz third.

=== 1970s ===
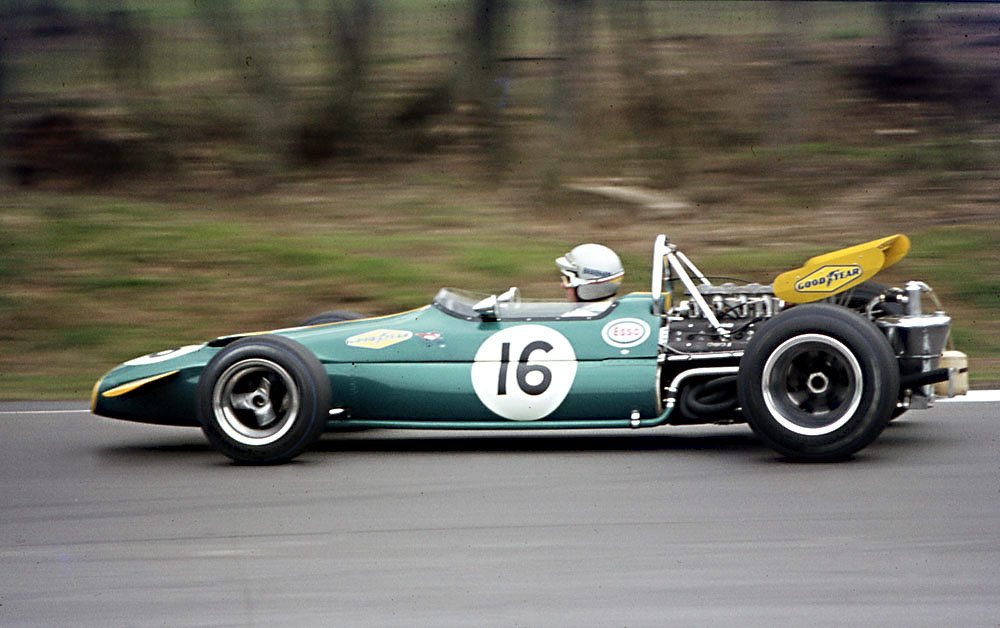
Jack Brabham during the 1970 Race of Champions

The International race calendar for 1970 opened with the Race of Champions. March Engineering made its Formula One-winning debut when Jackie Stewart won driving Ken Tyrrell's March-Cosworth 701.

The British Grand Prix returned to Brands Hatch on 19 July and saw victory go to Jochen Rindt by less than 33 seconds from Jack Brabham, who had run out of fuel. The Austrian driver of the Lotus was then disqualified following a protest over an aerofoil, but was reinstated before the evening was out. Third place went to Denny Hulme in the McLaren from the Ferrari of Clay Regazzoni; a lap down in fifth spot with the March of Chris Amon with Graham Hill sixth in the other Lotus. Rindt's winning speed was 108.69 mph (174.92 km/h).

Although the World Championship sports race was now BOAC 1000, but measured in kilometres, not miles, it was another Porsche benefit, the fearsome 917s taking the first three places from a 908; the first car home was the Pedro Rodríguez/Leo Kinnunen car from Vic Elford/Denny Hulme and Richard Attwood/Hans Herrmann. The 908 was driven by Gijs van Lennep and Hans Laine. The race was run over 235 laps at a speed of 92.15 mph (148.30 km/h).

By 1971, the ownership of Brands Hatch was in the hands of Motor Circuit Developments (MCD), which saw the arrival of another MCD-inspired single-seater formula in the shape of Formula Atlantic. The BOAC 1000 saw Alfa Romeo take their first major success in 20 years, with the chequered flag being taken by the 33TT3 of Andrea de Adamich and Henri Pescarolo, who completed the 235 laps at a speed of 97.17 mph (156.38 km/h). They were followed home by the Ferrari 312PB of Jacky Ickx and Clay Regazzoni, with the Porsche 917 of Jo Siffert and Derek Bell a further three laps down in third.

Motor Racing is a dangerous game and there had been some fatalities at Brands including the deaths of George Crossman, Tony Flory and Stuart Duncan in the mid-60s. But in October 1971, the season drew to its close with the death of a major driver. Jo Siffert died in an accident in the Rothmans World Championship Victory Race. This non-championship event for Formula One and Formula 5000 cars was arranged to mark Jackie Stewart and Ken Tyrrell's joint World Championships. The race was 40 laps in length; 'Seppi' lost control of his BRM P160 on lap 15, hit the bank at Hawthorn Hill, the car was engulfed in flames and he was asphyxiated before he could be extricated. The circuit came under a great deal of criticism, and it was agreed that a three-year programme of major safety modifications around the track would be commenced before the start of the 1972 season.

The 1972 season was a particularly busy one, with Formula One visiting twice for the Race of Champions on 19 March sponsored by Daily Mail and the John Player-sponsored British Grand Prix on 15 July (bearing the title European Grand Prix), while the BOAC 1000 was the British round of the World Championship of Makes. On 16 April, what was to be the last BOAC 1000 resulted in a complete Italian benefit race with Ferrari and Alfa Romeo filling the first six places. The 235-lap race was won by Mario Andretti and Jacky Ickx in a Ferrari 312PB, with the average race speed of 105.12 mph (169.17 km/h), from Tim Schenken and Ronnie Peterson, a lap down in a similar car. The first Alfa home completed the podium, was the 33TT3 of Rolf Stommelen and Peter Revson. And so to July, 76-laps of the Grand Prix Circuit adds up to just a few hundred yards over 200 miles which Emerson Fittipaldi completed in 1hr 47:50.2secs (108.67 mph (174.89 km/h)), driving the John Player Special Lotus-Cosworth 72D, from Jackie Stewart (Tyrrell-Cosworth 003), Peter Revson in the Team Yardley McLaren-Cosworth M19A, Chris Amon in the Matra-Simca MS120C, Denny Hulme Team Yardley McLaren-Cosworth M19C, with Arturo Merzario taking the last point in the Ferrari 312B2.

The following year, 1973, was less hectic; the BOAC 1000 was cancelled when the date offered by the FIA was unsuitable, and the year had an unfortunate Race of Champions. Peter Gethin driving a Formula 5000 Chevron-Chevrolet B24 beat the Formula One cars and James Hunt made his F1 debut in Hesketh Racing's March 731. Before the start of that season, £50,000 was spent upon a new grandstand adjoining the Grovewood Suite, while opening seating and new pits were built to comply with FIA requirements. There were also improvements made between Westfields and Stirlings.

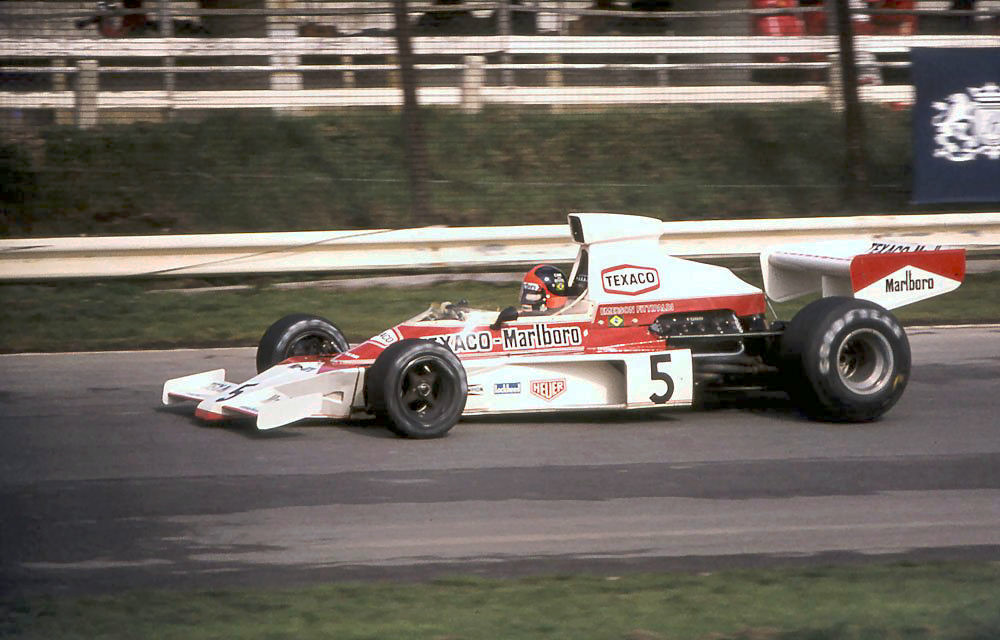
Emerson Fittipaldi (McLaren-Cosworth M23B) heading towards 2nd place in the 1974 British Grand Prix

It rained again during the Race of Champions in 1974, and the more nimble Formula One cars showed their heels to the Formula 5000 contingent; the winner was Jacky Ickx driving a Lotus-Ford 72E. The Grand Prix circus returned to Brands for a race on 20 July, and the RAC (who organised the race) came in for censure from the FIA for allowing the pit lane to be blocked during the race, thus preventing Niki Lauda from rejoining at the end to claim fifth place, which he was awarded on appeal. The winner was Jody Scheckter in a Tyrrell-Cosworth 007 who covered the 199.75 mi (321.47 km) race at an average pace of 115.73 mph (186.25 km/h), from Emerson Fittipaldi (McLaren-Cosworth M23B), Jacky Ickx (Lotus-Cosworth 72E), Clay Regazzoni and Niki Lauda (Ferrari 312B3) with Carlos Reutemann (Brabham-Cosworth BT44) in sixth.

The BOAC 1000 had become the British Airways 1000 and was dominated by the works Matra-Simca MS670C which finish first and second; first home were the Jean-Pierres – Jarier and Beltoise – with Henri Pescarolo and Gérard Larrousse second. Third, no less than 11 laps down, was the Gulf-Ford GR7 of Derek Bell and David Hobbs.

The winter of 1974/5 was mild, which was fortunate, allowing both tracks to be resurfaced in their entirety and completed in time for the opening event of 1975.

Tom Pryce had made a name for himself at Brands, driving Formula Ford and Formula F100 cars. He came to the British Airways/Daily Mail Race of Champions on 16 March as a works driver for the UOP Shadow. He drove the DN5; Pryce carved his way through the field, closing upon Jody Scheckter's Tyrrell-Cosworth when Scheckter's engine blew. This was Pryce's first and only Formula One win - he died a little over two years later during the 1977 South African Grand Prix.

The Grand Prix circuit, following realignment of Paddock Hill Bend and Bottom (now Cooper) Straight in early 1976

It was again Grand Prix year in 1976, and notwithstanding the money already spent, another £100,000 was expended on the track and safety work; the major change was a realignment of Paddock Bend, which resulted in a slight shortening of the circuit to 2.614 mi (4.207 km). Bottom Straight was also realigned making it straighter; this was all done to expand the cramped pit facilities. It was at this time that name changes occurred; Pilgrims became Hailwood Hill, Bottom Bend became Graham Hill Bend and Bottom Straight became Cooper Straight. The Grand Prix took place on 18 July and was somewhat controversial. Following a first-lap accident the race was stopped. This year's Race of Champions winner and national hero, James Hunt was involved so he took over the spare McLaren M23D, which he won, but was later disqualified by the FIA, as it was deemed that he had not completed the first lap. Ferrari's Niki Lauda was declared the winner from the Tyrrell of Jody Scheckter and John Watson's Penske PC3. Tom Pryce brought the Shadow home in fourth.

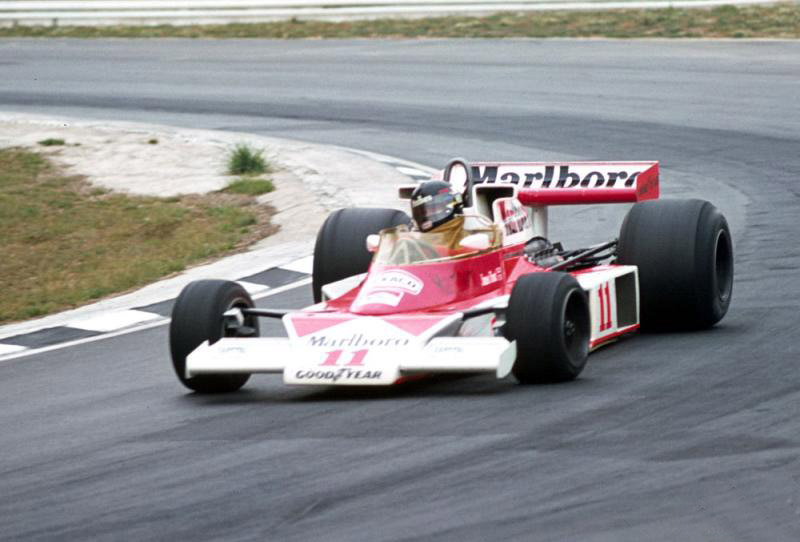
James Hunt (McLaren-Cosworth M23D) during the 1976 British Grand Prix

On 25 September, the second British round of the World Championship of Makes arrived for the Brands Hatch Six-Hours; it was run in a deluge which caused it to be stopped for an hour and it was eventually run over 103 laps – 269 mi (433 km) – which Jacky Ickx and Jochen Mass won at 97.696 mph (157.226 km/h) driving a Porsche 935/2 Turbo. The race totally dominated by the Stuttgart marque, the first five places going to Porsche 935 Turbos – a 934 Turbo was sixth with a Carrera seventh. A little relief came with the eighth-place BMW 320i, two more Porsches rounded out the first ten. In November, Brands Hatch took over the running of the annual Formula Ford Festival (which it still holds to this day) from Snetterton. This was won by Irishman Derek Daly in a Hawke DL17.

1977 was a quiet year, with James Hunt retaining his Race of Champions crown for McLaren. The event was not held in 1978, but this was a Grand Prix year. It was also a year to remember for it was also Indy year. Controversy again loomed at the Grand Prix, but trouble was averted; Niki Lauda had won the Swedish Grand Prix driving the Brabham BT46B 'fan car', but before it arrived in Kent, the car was banned by the FIA. Despite this, Lauda still finished second, in the conventional Brabham-Alfa Romeo BT46, behind the Ferrari 312T3 of Carlos Reutemann, with the other Brabham of John Watson in third. Fourth went to Patrick Depailler in a Tyrrell 008, with Hans-Joachim Stuck fifth in a Shadow DN9 and Patrick Tambay sixth, in a McLaren M26.

12 March 1978, saw the return of the European Touring Car Championship (ETCC) to Brands Hatch. Of the four BMW's entered, two did not even make the start. The other two were a Luigi car, entered by BMW Italia for Tom Walkinshaw and Umberto Grano, and the Jolly Club pairing of Carlo Facetti and Martino Finotto. The latter were the quickest car, but hopeless pit stops, saw the Luigi car took over the lead on lap 117 (out of 120) and take the spoils. Third was the VW Motorsport Scirocco of Richard Lloyd and Anton Stocker, as well as their class victory.

Te high-spot of the 1978 season at Brands Hatch and Silverstone was the coming of the USAC Champ Car. John Webb had gone to America to witness the organisation of Indy Racing at first hand. As a result of that visit, two rounds of the USAC National Championship were in England. The Silverstone race was wet and the Brands one dry. The costs were £500,000 but, unfortunately the race was said to not capture the imagination of the British enthusiasts, despite drivers as A. J. Foyt, Rick Mears, Tom Sneva and Danny Ongais. The Brands race was run on the Club Circuit which was then renamed the Indy Circuit in honour of the guests. The race was won by Mears (Gould Penske), from Sneva with the fastest lap going to Ongais at 104.66 mph (168.43 km/h) (41.4 secs.) – a new outright record.

1979 saw the return of the Race of Champions on 15 April, however the contained only seven regular cars that completed in the World Championship, while the rest of field was made up of entrants from the British Formula One Championship. The spoils of victory went to way of Ferrari, with Gilles Villeneuve winning in a modified 312T3. Second was Nelson Piquet in a Brabham-Alfa Romeo BT48, from Mario Andretti's Lotus-Cosworth 79 in third. Also, this year the World Championship of Makes arrived for again the Brands Hatch Six-Hours with victory going to Reinhold Joest and Volkert Merl in their Joest Racing Porsche 908/3 Turbo.

The Jolly Club pairing of Carlo Facetti and Martino Finotto, were out of luck again, when the ETCC landed in Kent for the Brands Hatch 500 km. They lost the lead of the race they had comfortably headed for 100 of a scheduled 120 laps, when the gear lever broke. Once again the rival Luigi team were on hand to take a well deserved win, this time being driven the Belgian team of Raymond van Hove, Jean Xhenceval and Pierre Dieudonné with the familiar BMW CSL.

=== 1980s ===
The circuit did not see a Race of Champions in 1980 – the Formula One calendar was now so full that the teams could not afford a week to run in a non-championship race and henceforward, British fans would have only one opportunity to see current F1 cars in action per year. A little piece of motor racing history was written when Desiré Wilson became the first woman to win a Formula One race when she won a round of the British Formula One Championship, driving a Wolf WR4.

27 April 1980, saw the final ETCC race at Brands Hatch, literally saw Harald Neger blow away victory in his Racing Corporation Vienna BMW 635CSi. The Austrian stormed through the field in lap one, following a bad practice, but the engine had been over-revved. Now the Eggenberger Motorsport BMW 320s took over, and after Hans-Jürg Dürig had to retire with a broken seat, Siegfried Müller Jr. and Helmut Kelleners won the race, with an older BMW 3.0 CSi second with the Belgian pairing of Michel Delcourt and Jean-Marie Baert.

Ayrton Senna da Silva's European car racing debut, 1 March 1981 was impressive, but not sensational, finishing fifth during a P&O Ferries Championship (Formula Ford 1600), driving a Van Diemen RF80. A fortnight later competing in the Townsend Thoresen Championship, Senna totally dominated the race despite a very heavy downpour, winning by 9.4 seconds during 15-lap race on the Indy Circuit. This time driving a Van Diemen RF81. Few knew beforehand that this race would make history – Senna first win.

On 16 March, the Brands Hatch Six-Hours was run and saw a healthy invasion of Italian cars; Lancia Beta Monte Carlos in the hands of Riccardo Patrese and Walter Röhrl, with Michele Alboreto and Eddie Cheever taking the two places for Lancia Corse, the winning car being the only one to complete the full race distance of 147 laps, at 99.384 mph (159.943 km/h). In third spot a further lap down was the De Cadenet LM of Alain de Cadenet and Desiré Wilson. This was Alan Jones's World Championship year and on his way to the crown he won the Marlboro British Grand Prix on 13 July, in a Williams-Cosworth FW07B from Nelson Piquet and Carlos Reutemann. Piquet's Brabham-Cosworth BT49 split the two Williams, Derek Daly and Jean-Pierre Jarier filling the next spots for Tyrrell, with a young Frenchman, Alain Prost for McLaren in sixth. There was a slimmed down calendar in 1981 with but one International, the emphasis being on top-class national racing.

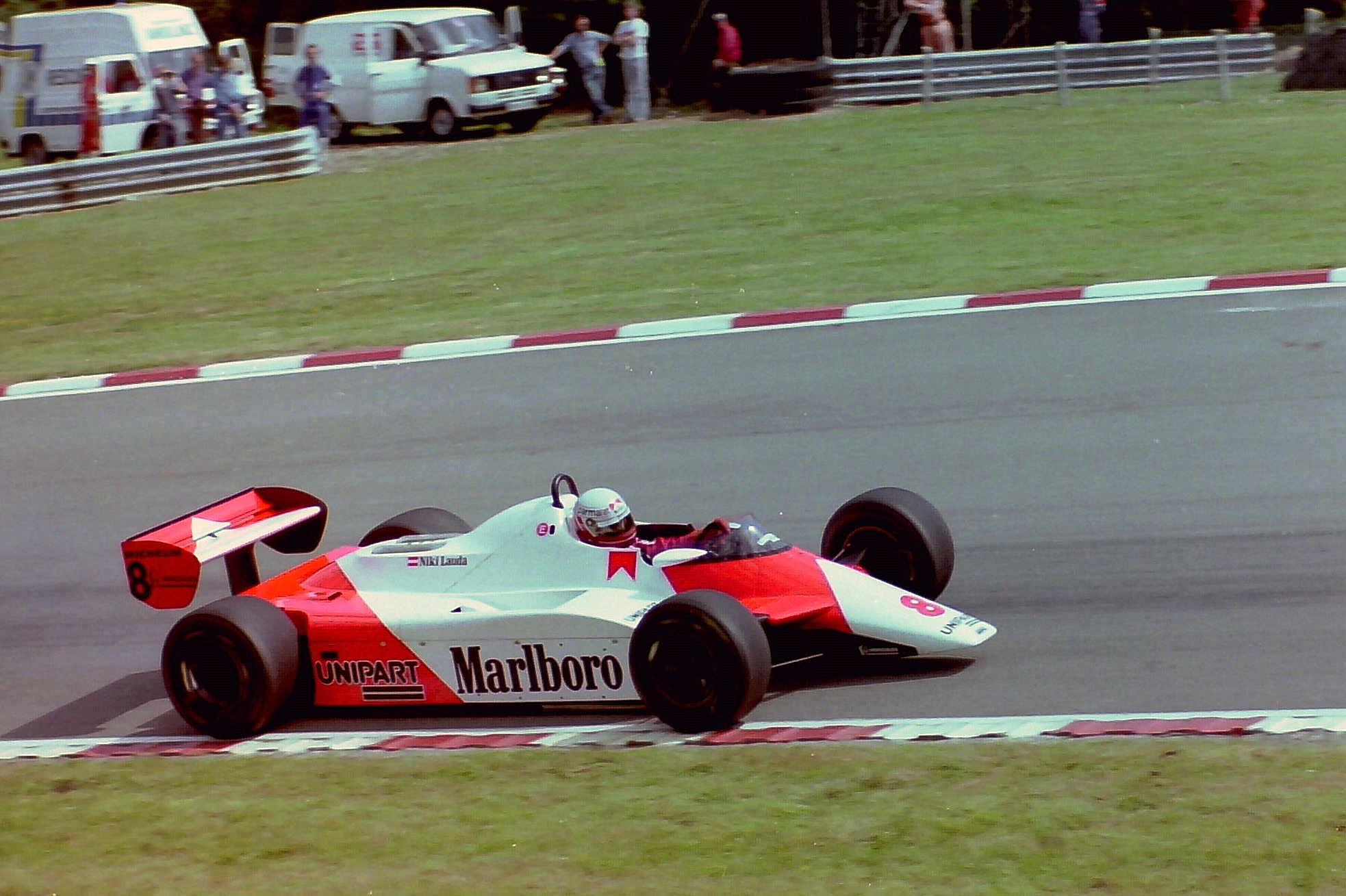
Niki Lauda on his way to win the 1982 British Grand Prix

By contrast 1982 was extremely busy. The highlight of the year was the Marlboro British Grand Prix and it was voted the best of the year by the members of the Formula One Constructors Association. Once again the Grand Prix was run over 199 mi (320 km) (76 laps), the winner being Niki Lauda in the McLaren-Cosworth MP4/1B from the Ferrari 126C2 of Didier Pironi and Patrick Tambay. The winner speed was 124.650 mph (200.605 km/h).

It was a non-Grand Prix year at Brands in 1983, but the Marlboro Daily Mail Race of Champions was successfully staged on 10 April, notwithstanding the fact it was only a week before the French Grand Prix and clashed with a tyre test at Paul Ricard. It was also the last non-championship F1 race to be held in the sport's history. It was won by the reigning world champion Keke Rosberg in the Williams FW08, who narrowly beat Danny Sullivan in his Tyrrell 011. Meanwhile, former world champion Alan Jones finished third in his last drive for Arrows. To bring some real excitement, noise and spectacle back into British motor racing, the BRSCC invented Thundersports. The new series had its debut on Easter Monday and the country's first major sport car race since the mid-1970s was a resounding success. Then, the year turned into a Grand Prix one after all; following the cancellation of the proposed New York Grand Prix, John Webb lobbied FISA in company with the RAC MSA and was granted the opportunity to run the Grand Prix d’Europe on 25 September, thus giving Britain its second Grand Prix that season.

The full circus arrived in Kent and Elio de Angelis placed his Lotus-Renault 94T on pole position; the race was 76 laps/199 miles long which Nelson Piquet in the Brabham-BMW BT52B won at 124.411 mph (200.220 km/h). Alain Prost followed him home 6 sec later in the Renault RE40 with Nigel Mansell in the second Lotus in third.

In 1984, Brands become the first British circuit to hold Grands Prix in three consecutive years since the 1950s. This was officially the year for Kent to host the British Grand Prix but it was fraught with politics as Tyrrell was adjudged by the sport's governing body to have infringed the rules at the Canadian Grand Prix and was excluded from the remainder of the season. A court injunction ensured that the cars started their home race, but Stefan Bellof and Stefan Johansson qualified the cars on the back row of the grid, the former finishing 11th but Johansson being eliminated in a first-lap accident. The win went to Niki Lauda, driving a McLaren-TAG MP4/2. Second was Derek Warwick in the Renault RE50 and Ayrton Senna driving the Toleman-Hart TG184 into third place. Lauda's winning speed was 124.382 mph (200.173 km/h).

1984 saw the return of the European Formula Two Championship, the first visit since Jochen Rindt's win in 1967, which was also the last race for this category before being replaced by Formula 3000. 23 September turned out to be very wet, with the original race lasting only 16 laps being stopped due to heavy rain. The remaining 31 laps were run later in the day, with Philippe Streiff in an AGS-BMW winning on aggregate from the Martini-BMW of Michel Ferté and Roberto Moreno in a Ralt-Honda.

On 22 September 1985, Brands Hatch hosted the second British round of the World Endurance Championship in the form of the Brands Hatch 1000km. It was to be another Porsche benefit, which the Stuttgart cars taking a 1–2 finish; first was the 962C of Derek Bell and Hans-Joachim Stuck (who jointly took the driver's title) with the identical car of Jacky Ickx and Jochen Mass second – these two were the only cars to covered the full race distance of 238 laps. Five laps down in third was the Lancia-Martini LC2 of Bob Wollek/Mauro Baldi/Andrea de Cesaris.

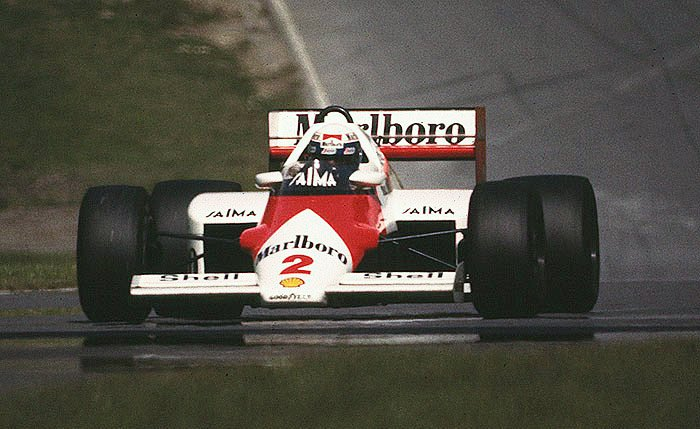
Alain Prost on his way to the 1985 Drivers title

A fortnight later, for the second time in three years, Britain staged two Grands Prix in one season; in July, the British Grand Prix was held at Silverstone, but the loss of a race in New York City made a date available in Europe towards the end of the season. The management team led by John Webb made a bid for it and won the right to host the Grand Prix d’Europe on 6 October. It was fitting that Nigel Mansell should score his first Grand Prix win on this occasion, at the wheel of a Williams-Honda FW10B, completing the 75 laps of the Grand Prix Circuit, at a speed of 125.795 mph (202.447 km/h) from Ayrton Senna's Lotus-Renault 97T and teammate Keke Rosberg in the other Williams. Alain Prost brought his McLaren-TAG MP4/2B home in fourth, to win become the 1985 World Drivers' Championship.

In October that year, rumours started to circulate regarding the future of Motor Circuit Developments; at the time the property of Eagle Star Holdings which had been sold to British American Tobacco. This caused some alarm as to the future of the circuits. Thanks to the efforts of John Webb, John Foulston, the then Chairman of Atlantic Computers plc and a staunch enthusiast of motorsport, secured the future of Brands Hatch, Oulton Park and Snetterton for 'the foreseeable future' in a £5.25m bid. Early in 1987, he added Cadwell Park to his fold, which came to be known as the Brands Hatch Leisure Group.

The Kentish Circuit was to host the Grand Prix only once more and that was on 13 July 1986 (making five years in a row), after which it was to be run continually at Silverstone. The reason for this was that the international motorsports governing body at the time, FISA, had instituted a policy of long-term contracts with circuits. Brands Hatch was perceived as a poorer facility, and it did have very little run-off and room to expand, something Silverstone as a former World War II airfield had in acres. Silverstone and the BRDC had signed a seven-year contract with Formula 1 and FISA at some point in 1986, to run from 1987 to 1993. The 1986 race saw Piquet take pole at 140.53 mph (226.16 km/h), the fastest lap ever recorded at Brands up to that point, and 22 mph faster than the pole time set for the 1976 race on the same layout. Race day saw a major first lap accident at Paddock Bend where Jacques Laffite (Ligier-Renault JS27) broke both legs after going head-on into the wall on the right side of the track, which spelt the end of his F1 career and Brands Hatch as a Formula One circuit. It was his 176th Grand Prix, equalling Graham Hill's record. Nigel Mansell's Williams-Honda FW11 had rolled to a stop shortly after the start but, as a result of the race stoppage, he was able to use the spare Williams (which was set up for his teammate Nelson Piquet) and he took the restart, eventually winning from Piquet. Mansell won at a speed of 129.007 mph (207.617 km/h). Alain Prost was third in his McLaren MP4/2C with fourth going to René Arnoux in the other Ligier, with the Tyrrells of Martin Brundle and Philippe Streiff taking the final points.

A week later, the World Sports Car Championship contingent arrived in Kent for the Brands Hatch 1000. The first three places were taken by Porsche 956s, the winning car of Bob Wollek and Mauro Baldi (Richard Lloyd Racing Porsche 956 GTi) being the only car to complete the 238 laps, at a speed of 104.608 mph (168.350 km/h). Second home was Joest Racing's 956 of Derek Bell, Hans-Joachim Stuck and Klaus Ludwig, with the Brun Motorsport 956 of Thierry Boutsen and Frank Jelinski third, four and five laps down respectively.

Almost exactly a year later, Brands echoed to the sound of the sports car, although the championship was now called, World Sports-Prototype Championship for Teams (WSPC) and the race was the Shell Gemini 1000 run on 26 July 1987. This was the year of the 'big cats', with the Tom Walkinshaw Racing run Silk Cut Jaguar team and their XJR-8 of Raul Boesel and John Nielsen, who won at an average speed of 111.80 mph (179.92 km/h) with the Richard Lloyd Racing entered Porsche 962GTi of Mauro Baldi and Johnny Dumfries second, these two being the only cars to run the full distance. Third, no less than nine laps adrift, was Jan Lammers and John Watson's XJR-8.

Brands Hatch Grand Prix circuit, following the introduction of the Dingle Dell chicane in 1988

If the Grand Prix was lost to Brands, large-capacity single-seater racing cars were not entirely so and on 23 August, the Intercontinental F3000 Championship was run, as the early years of the championship, the cars were all Cosworth-powered Lolas, Marches and Ralts. The race was over 45 laps, making a distance of 117 mi (188 km), which Julian Bailey won at 119.30 mph (191.99 km/h) in a Lola T87/50. In second place was Maurício Gugelmin, followed by Roberto Moreno, both Ralt RT21-mounted, with Stefano Modena and Yannick Dalmas.

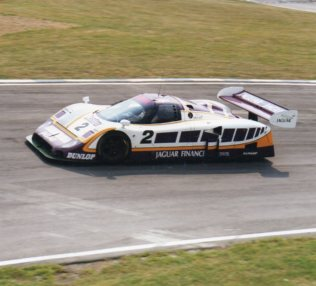
A Silk Cut Jaguar XJR-9 turning onto the Grand Prix Circuit, during the 1988 Brands Hatch 1000

The big sports cars returned again on 24 July 1988. The 'big cats' were victorious again, this time using Jaguar XJR-9s, driven by Martin Brundle, John Nielsen and Andy Wallace. They were the only car to complete the full race distance, averaging 112.31 mph (180.75 km/h). in second place was the Joest Racing Porsche 962C of Bob Wollek and Klaus Ludwig, with third going to Mauro Baldi and Jean-Louis Schlesser in their Sauber-Mercedes C9 .

A little under a month later, the F3000 brigade arrived. Practice was marred by a series of worrying accidents, but Johnny Herbert took pole position with his teammate Martin Donnelly alongside in the Eddie Jordan Racing Reynard 88Ds. In the race, they were in a class of their own with Herbert taking a huge lead as the race was stopped following an accident at Paddock Bend. At the restart Donnelly moved into the lead from Pierluigi Martini, but Gregor Foitek and Herbert touched, resulting in a bad accident and a second stoppage. Herbert was seriously injured, suffering major leg fractures. At the third start, Donnelly went away to score a debut win in the Formula, at 120.8 mph (194.4 km/h), from Martini in a March 88B and Mark Blundell in a Lola T88/50.

On 23 July 1989, the WSPC contenders arrived in Kent, for the Brands Hatch Trophy. Following changes to championship rules, the race distance was down to 115 laps of the Grand Prix Circuit, making a race distance of 299 mi (481 km), which was won by the Sauber-Mercedes C9 of Mauro Baldi and Kenny Acheson, at an average speed of 111.15 mph (178.88 km/h). into second place came a Porsche 962C contested by Bob Wollek and Frank Jelinski, from the second Sauber of Jean-Louis Schlesser and Jochen Mass. The British cars were placed fourth and fifth, the Aston Martin AMR1 of David Leslie and Brian Redman beating the Jaguar XJR-11 of Jan Lammers and Patrick Tambay.

A month later, on 20 August, the International F3000 Championship was held over 48 laps of the Grand Prix Circuit, which Martin Donnelly won the second successive year in a Reynard 89D at 120.66 mph (194.18 km/h). Second was teammate Jean Alesi, followed by Érik Comas in a Lola T89/50.

==== Brands Hatch Racing ====
Brands Hatch Racing
- Base: United Kingdom
- Noted drivers: (South Africa) Desiré Wilson

Formula One World Championship career
- First entry: 1980 British Grand Prix
- Races entered: 1 (0 starts)
- Constructors: Williams
- Constructors' Championships: 0
- Drivers' Championships: 0
- Race victories: 0
- Pole positions: 0
- Fastest laps: 0
- Final entry: 1980 British Grand Prix

Brands Hatch Racing was a Formula One entrant in 1980. They competed in the 1980 British Grand Prix with driver Desiré Wilson, Williams as manufacturer of the Williams FW07 with a Ford engine and Goodyear tyres. As car number 43 its qualifying position of 27th was not good enough to qualify for the race. In the following years, they were involved in sports car racing between 1980 and 1984:

Year	Date	Race	Car	Drivers	Result
1980	16 March	6 Hours of Brands Hatch	Tiga SC80-Ford Pinto	Divina Galica; Mark Thatcher	11th
1984	20 April	Thundersports The Gold Cup Oulton Park	Lola T610-Ford-Cosworth	Steve Kempton; John Bartlett	-
1984	23 April	Thundersports Brands Hatch a.k.a.Thundersports Easter Monday	Lola T610-Ford-Cosworth	Steve Kempton; John Bartlett	-
1984	22 July	Thundersports Brands Hatch a.k.a.John Player Special British Grand Prix	Tiga TS84-Ford-Cosworth	Gary Brabham; Tim Lee-Davey	8th
1984	22 July	Thundersports Brands Hatch a.k.a.John Player Special British Grand Prix	Lola T610-Ford-Cosworth	Steve Kempton; Duncan Gray; John Bartlett	DNF

=== 1990s ===
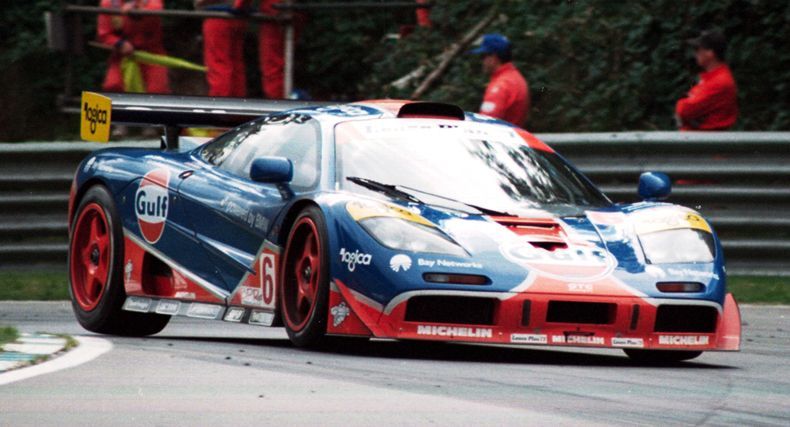
The 1996-spec Gulf Racing McLaren at Brands Hatch

Exactly a year later on 19 August 1990, the Formula 3000 cars were back to contest the eighth round of the Championship. Allan McNish won the 125 mi (201 km) race at 108.26 mph (174.23 km/h) in a Lola T90/50 with a Mugen engine, followed by Damon Hill in an identical car, with a Cosworth power plant. The final step of the podium was taken by Marco Apicella. The Sports Prototypes did not return to Kent in 1990, going to Donington Park instead.

Brands Hatch in 1999

The 1991 International Formula 3000 Championship returned on 18 August for another 125 mi (201 km) race around the Grand Prix Circuit. Reynard 91Ds filled the first three places, first home being Emanuele Naspetti at 123.9 mph (199.4 km/h), driving with Cosworth-power, from Alex Zanardi in a similar car. Third went to Christian Fittipaldi in the Pacific Racing Mugen entered Reynard.

International motor racing returned for the 1996 BPR 4 Hours of Brands Hatch, when a round of the BPR Global GT Series for GT1 and GT2 sports cars was staged there on 8 September. The Porsche 911 GT1 of Hans-Joachim Stuck and Thierry Boutsen led home three McLaren F1 GTRs driven by Andy Wallace/Olivier Grouillard, Pierre-Henri Raphanel/Lindsay Owen-Jones and John Nielsen/Thomas Bscher.

In October 1999, Octagon, a part of Interpublic, commenced negotiations for the purchase of Brands Hatch Leisure Group. In December an agreement was reached, with control of Brands Hatch, Cadwell Park, Oulton Park and Snetterton passing to the new owners for £120m. Octagon obtained the right from the FIA to run the British Grand Prix from 2002 and announced the intention of rebuilding the Grand Prix Circuit, whilst at the same time negotiating with the British Racing Drivers Club to run the Grand Prix at Silverstone. An agreement was reached which ensured that the Grand Prix will be run at Silverstone for 15 years. Because of this agreement, the layout of the Grand Prix Circuit at Brands Hatch stayed nearly identical to before.

=== 2000s ===
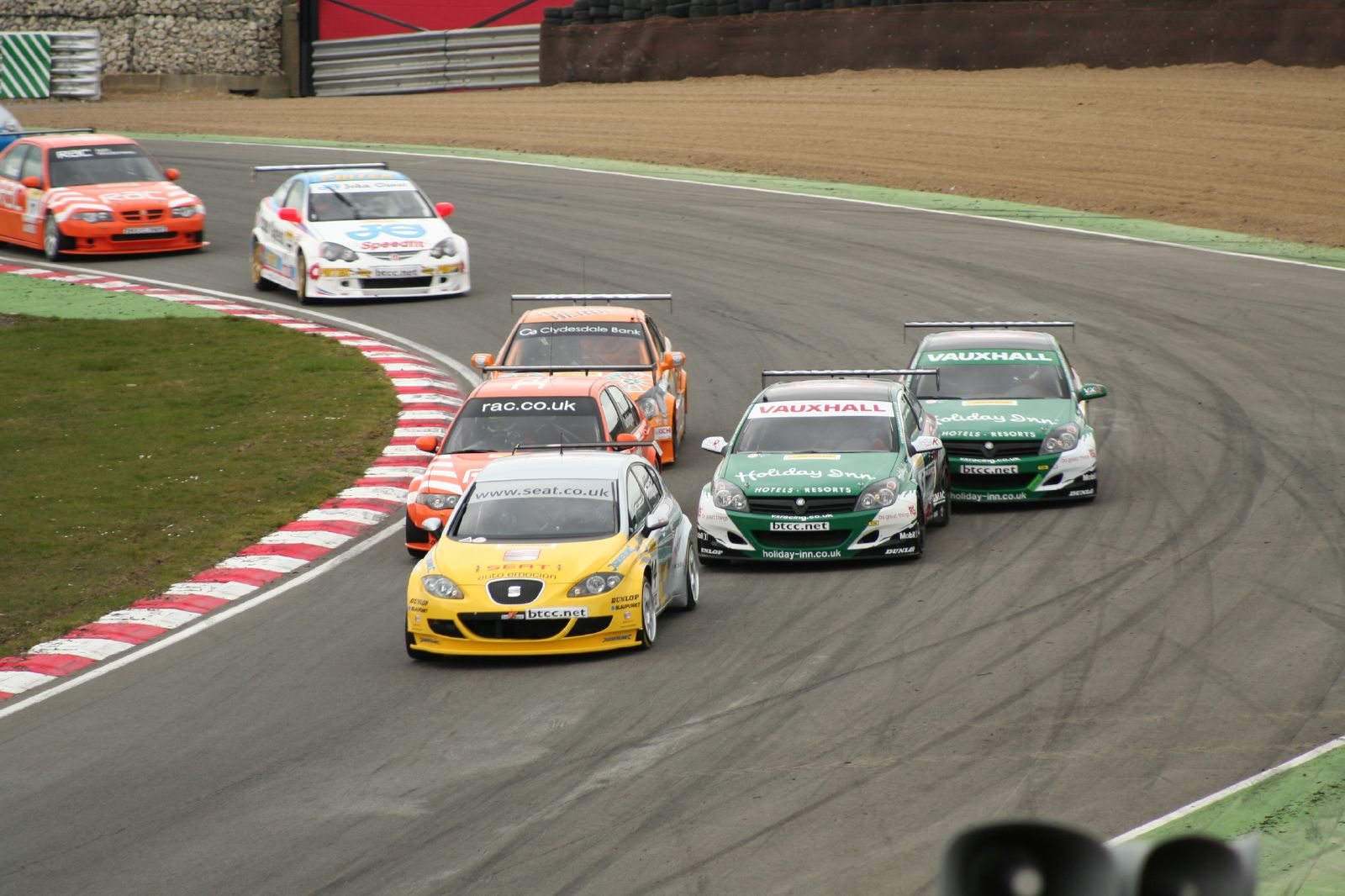
James Thompson's SEAT Leon leads the field into Paddock Hill Bend during a BTCC race in April 2006.

The circuit has a curfew of 18:30 due to a housing estate built near to Clearways bend. Race engines cannot be started until after 08:30 and must be turned off by 18:30. Despite this, Brands Hatch holds race meetings on almost every weekend during the motorsport season, ranging from small club series to major international races attracting up to 50,000 spectators.

After Octagon failed to obtain the necessary planning permission and subsequent leasing of the British Grand Prix to Silverstone, this left Brands Hatch without any top-line single-seater racing. However, high-profile single-seater did return in 2003, when the London Champ Car Trophy, a round of the CART Series, was held at the circuit. Despite attracting around 40,000 spectators to see Sébastien Bourdais (Newman/Haas Racing Lola) win, the race was not retained for subsequent seasons.

Brands Hatch after removal of the Dingle Dell chicane, and renaming of the corner after Barry Sheene

Over the winter of 2002/03, the Dingle Dell chicane was reprofiled and removed. The motorcycle racing governing body (FIM) requested the change ahead of the World Superbike Championship visit in August, but it also allowed the installation of extra gravel traps should the CART be switched from the Indy Circuit to the Grand Prix configuration. Shortly after completion, Barry Sheene died, and the new complex was renamed the Sheene Curve.

One of the biggest developments in the circuit's history occurred in January 2004, when Jonathan Palmer's MotorSport Vision company completed the purchase of Brands Hatch and the other Octagon venues (Cadwell Park, Oulton Park, and Snetterton). Palmer immediately implemented a programme of improvements to the venue, designed to heighten customer experiences both for spectators and competitors.

25 September 2005, the inaugural A1 Grand Prix of Nations was held at Brands Hatch. A1 Grand Prix was a single-seater one-make series where the drivers represented their nation, as opposed themselves or a team. The first race, an 18-lap Sprint saw Nelson Piquet Jr. lead flag-to-flag to win for A1 Team Brazil, ahead of Alexandre Premat (France) and Matt Halliday (New Zealand). The 35-lap Main race also went to Piquet Jr. with Australia's Will Power second, and Mexico's Salvador Durán third.

On a rainy and cold 21 May 2006, SEAT and Chevrolet shared the honours on the first visit of the World Touring Car Championship (WTCC)'s to Brands Hatch. Despite the weather, a good crowd came to the circuit to witness two races that were both run on soaked asphalt. SEAT Sport secured a 1–2–3 finish with Yvan Muller taking the flag ahead of teammates Peter Terting and James Thompson. Alain Menu was welcomed back to the pits as a hero by the RML garage at the end of Race 2 as he achieved the team's first WTCC victory. SEAT's Rickard Rydell finished second on the podium with fellow SEAT driver, Thompson obtaining another third place of the day.

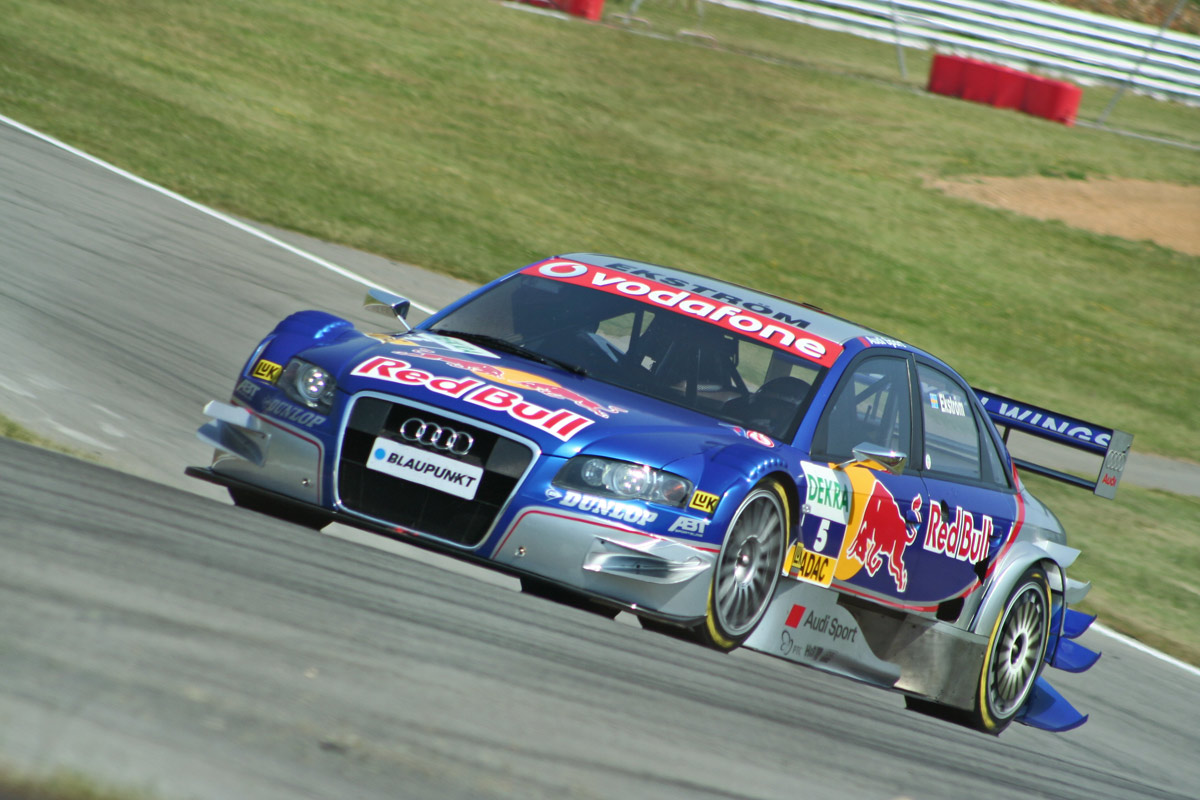
Mattias Ekström driving for Audi in the 2006 Deutsche Tourenwagen Masters trip to Brands Hatch

2006, also saw the first visit of the Deutsche Tourenwagen Masters (DTM) on 2 July. In the warm English sunshine, 21,500 fans witnessed Tom Kristensen, who seemed to be a sure winner in his Audi A4, but with 16 of the 85 laps to go, his car shot off with problems. The winner was the Swede, Mattias Ekström. Second and third were Jamie Green and Bernd Schneider.

The A1 Grand Prix cars returned on 29 April 2007, for the finale of their 2006/07 season. This time Great Britain was victorious in the Sprint with Robbie Kerr driving, with Nico Hülkenberg (Germany) and Enrico Toccacelo (Italy) third. Hülkenberg reversed the result in the Main to win from Kerr with Toccacelo again in third.

A perfect pit stop strategy, overtaking manoeuvres and a vast experience enabled Bernd Schneider (AMG-Mercedes C-Klasse) to take the DTM victory when the series visited in 2007. Only 0.543 seconds behind was Martin Tomczyk, with third going to Mattias Ekström, both driving Audi Team Abt Sportsline entered A4s.

23 September 2007, saw Alain Menu claim victory in Race 1, after not putting a wheel wrong all race. The Chevrolet driver came under pressure from N.Technology's James Thompson on numerous occasion but the Alfa Romeo never got close enough to overtake, Third across the line was Colin Turkington's BMW. Race 2 saw Andy Priaulx take his first ever win at the wheel of a touring car at Brands. The man from Guernsey lead home Félix Porteiro (BMW) and Robert Huff (Chevrolet).

Brands Hatch held the finale again on 4 May 2008. Like the previous season, Robbie Kerr won the Sprint race the American, Jonathan Summerton and Ireland's Adam Carroll taking the next two steps on the podium. The Main race went to way of Team India's Narain Karthikeyan from Kerr in second and Neel Jani (Switzerland) third.

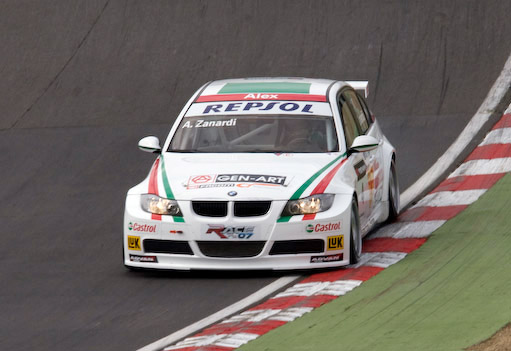
Alex Zanardi driving a BMW 320si in 2008 WTCC, on his way the third in Race 2

WTCC witnessed BMW and Chevrolet share the glory when they returned to Kent for the WTCC Race of UK, 27 July 2008. Jörg Müller of BMW Team Germany and Alain Menu for Chevrolet claimed a win each. The German inherited his win when Robert Huff (Chevrolet) went off while leading. As for Menu, this was his third WTCC win at Brands in three years, closely followed home by Félix Porteiro and Alex Zanardi in third.

31 August 2008 saw unstable weather conditions, and Timo Scheider (Audi Team Abt Sportline) defended an extremely narrow lead against the Mercedes driver, Paul di Resta. In front of a weekend crowd of 26,800, Mattias Ekström recovered with a drive to finish third.

Brands Hatch has held sixteen Superbike World Championship, since 1993, when Giancarlo Falappa's double victory in the pouring rain, including two rounds in 2000. Brands has featured in many of the pivotal moments in the championship's history, including Carl Fogarty's double victory in 1995, and more recently James Toseland's double in 2007, not forgetting Shane 'Shakey' Bryne's double as a "wildcard" entrant back in 2003. The last visit in 2008 saw Ryuichi Kiyonari take his first two World Superbike wins of his career, although this was overshadowed by the death of Craig Jones in a supporting World Supersports race. Unfortunately, the circuit owners, MotorSport Vision and the championship organisers FG Sport decided not to return to Brands Hatch in 2009, over a dispute about an increased sanctioning fee.

Back in 1999, the event was dominated by Fogarty's fan, his following was enormous. He would attract a record crowd of 100,000 spectators to Brands (unofficially, the figure was nearer 120,000). The grandstands were red with Ducati jackets and shirts. The flags were covered with the menacing image of the "Foggy Eyes" and Union Jacks. Despite all this support the American, Colin Edwards (Honda) taking the double.

2009 saw the last A1 Grand Prix, and this was held at Brands Hatch, following the cancellation of the final round in Mexico. Adam Carroll won both races for A1 Team Ireland. The Sprint podium was completed by Team India's Narain Karthikeyan and Mexico's Salvador Durán, with Holland's Jeroen Bleekemolen and Swiss driver Neel Jani doing the same in the Main race.

Once again Alain Menu proved to be one of the men to beat when the WTCC revisited Brands in 2009; the Swiss overtook his teammate Robert Huff in the early stages of Race 1 and added another victory to his impressive tally on this track. Huff finished second from an aggressive Andy Priaulx (BMW). Augusto Farfus (BMW) turned pole into victory in Race 2, with teammate Jörg Müller following him home in second. Gabriele Tarquini (SEAT) won a tough fight for third with Priaulx and Rickard Rydell (SEAT).

DTM returned to Kent for their annual visit on 6 September 2009. Paul di Resta delivered a timely victory for HWA Team and Mercedes-Benz, after he made a good start from pole position, as he fended off the first corner challenge of Timp Scheider's Audi, to claim Mercedes' 150th DTM win.

=== 2010s ===
On 18 July 2010, Yvan Muller and Robert Huff gave RML's Chevrolet a 1–2 finished the WTCC Race 1 of UK, ahead of Independent runner, Colin Turkington's Team RAC BMW who drove a great race to take the final podium position from Alain Menu on the penultimate lap. BMW Team RBM's Andy Priaulx converted pole position into a Race 2 win on home turf. Turkington went one better in race two to bring his BMW 320i across the line in second to complete a great result for British drivers. Gabriele Tarquini secured the final podium spot for SR-Sport and SEAT.

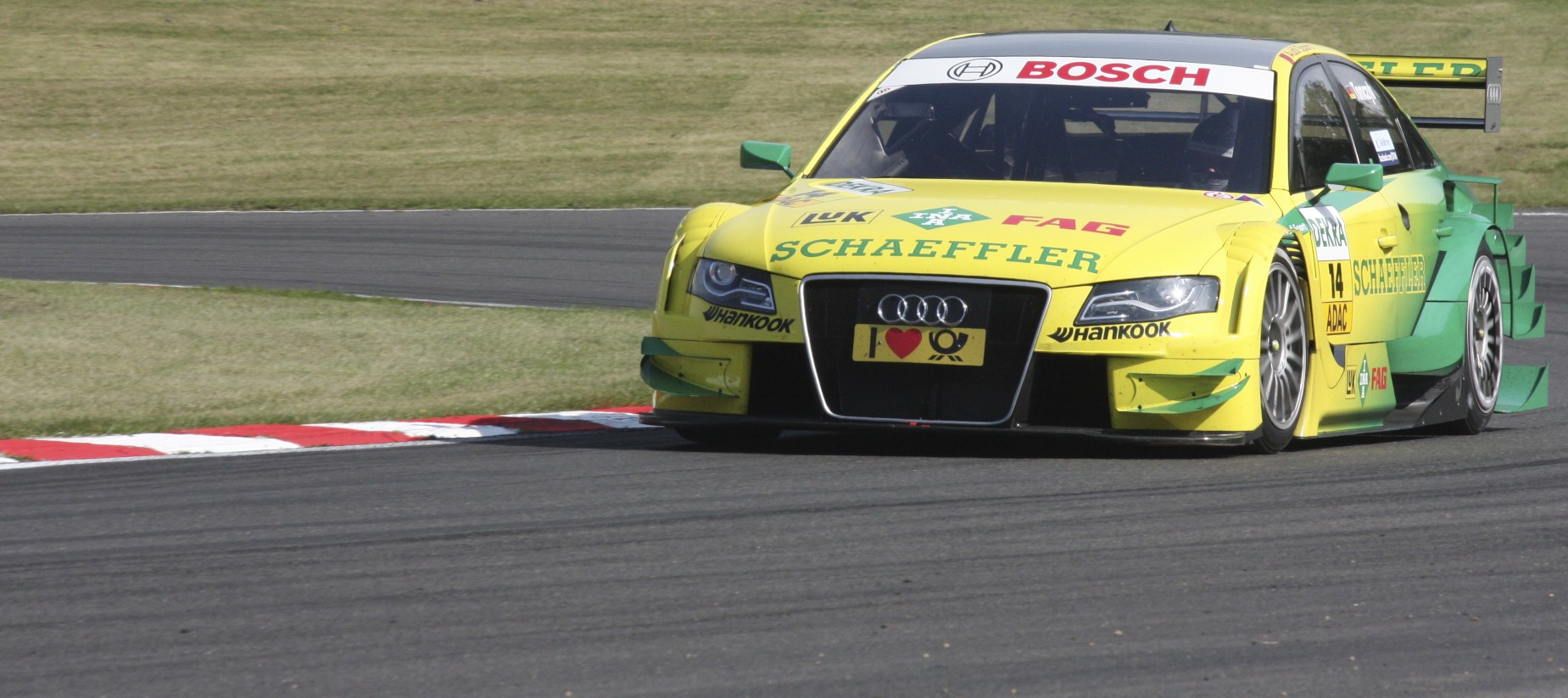
Martin Tomczyk in an Audi A4 DTM Brands Hatch, September 2011

With an impressive display, Paul di Resta takes another DTM in 2010. After 98 laps, he crossed the finish line with his AMG-Mercedes C-Klasse, 7.4 seconds ahead of his teammate Bruno Spengler, thus repeated last year's victory. Double champion, Timo Scheider (Audi) completed the podium.

Martin Tomczyk headed an Audi 1–2–3 in a wet race at Brands Hatch, on 4 September 2011. Mattias Ekström secured second, just two seconds behind and closing. Edoardo Mortara was third, just two seconds ahead of top Mercedes driver, Gary Paffett in fourth.

On 20 May 2012, Gary Paffett Mercedes-AMG C-Coupé DTM won his home DTM race, from pole position. His margin of victory over Bruno Spengler BMW M3 DTM was five seconds. Mike Rockenfeller completed the top three in the Team Phoenix Audi A5 DTM, making it three different manufacturers on the podium. This was Mercedes' fourth win out of seven races at Brands Hatch.

The DTM competitors returned to Brands, May 2013, where Mike Rockenfeller dominated with a lights-to-flag win, in his Audi RS5. The reigning champion, Bruno Spengler was second for BMW with his fellow Canadian, Robert Wickens taking third for Mercedes-Benz. However the DTM cars did not return in 2014, as the series expanded into Eastern Europe and China. DTM chief, Hans Werner Aufrecht said that "while Brands and Zandvoort had been good venues for the championship, Hungary and China were stronger markets". Meanwhile, Jonathan Palmer, head of Brands owner MotorSport Vision, said the decision to part with the DTM was a mutual one. "We have enjoyed hosting DTM at Brands Hatch for eight years but we have agreed with ITR that it's time for the event to move on. We witnessed great races at these circuits and have to say thank you for the good cooperation," he said.

After a four-year hiatus, it was confirmed that DTM would return to Brands Hatch in August 2018, this time competing on the full Grand Prix layout.

The British Superbike Championship season finale has also been regularly hosted at the circuit, with the 2011 deciding round proving particularly dramatic, as Tommy Hill and John Hopkins frequently overtook each other on the final lap, with Hill emerging as the champion by 0.006 of a second. Brands Hatch typically hosts three rounds of the series, including two events on the Grand Prix circuit.

The opening and closing rounds of the British Touring Car Championship are also held at Brands Hatch, with the champions typically crowned at the circuit in October.

Brands Hatch had hosted Britcar's 'Into the Night' race from 2008 to 2011. After a four-year hiatus, it hosted the final round of the 2016 season in the night again and this event continues annually.

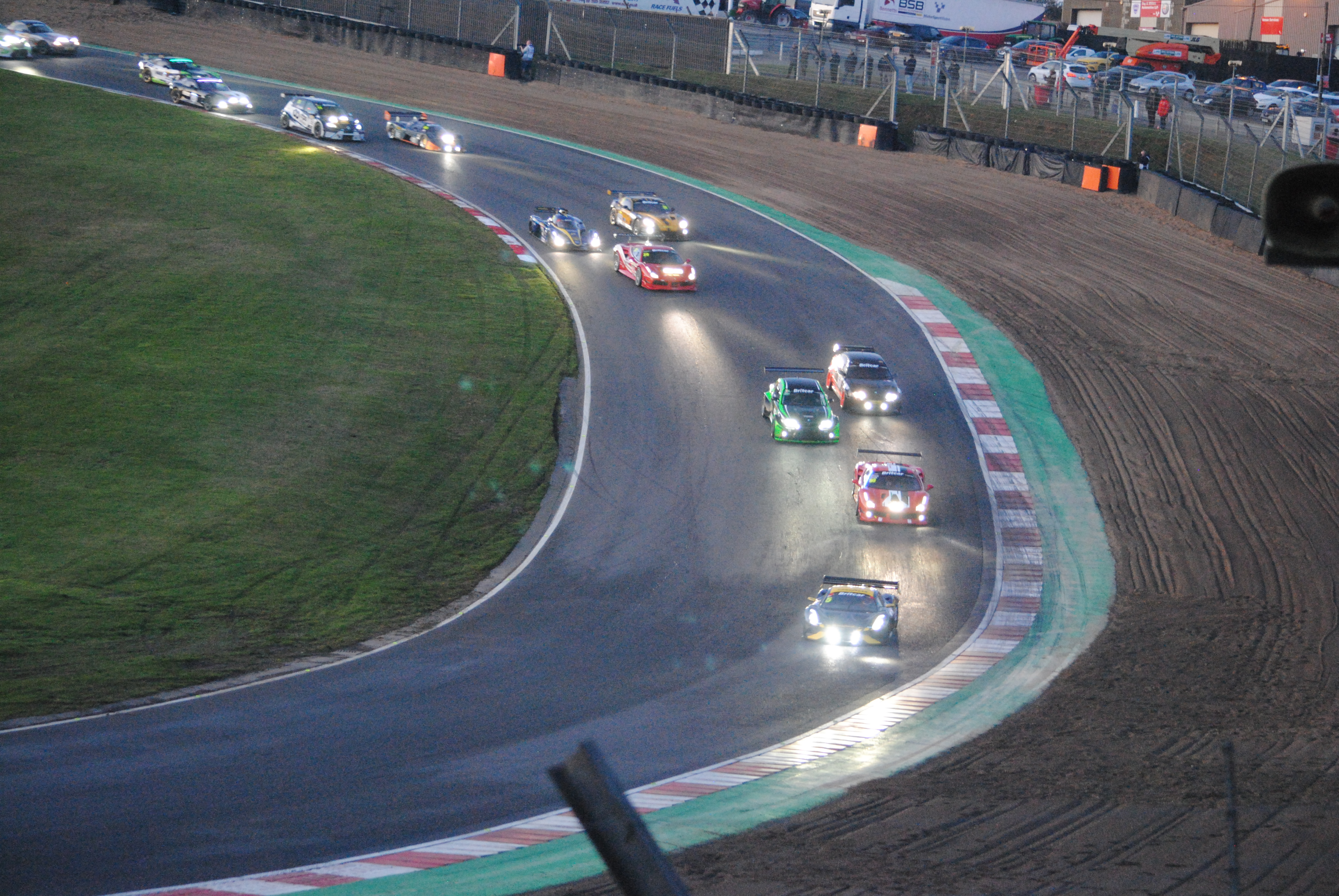
The start of the 2019 night race on Sunday, led by the new Brabham BT62

Truck racing has also developed into a large family-friendly event, with the series final event of the year concluded with a large fireworks display which attracts huge crowds.

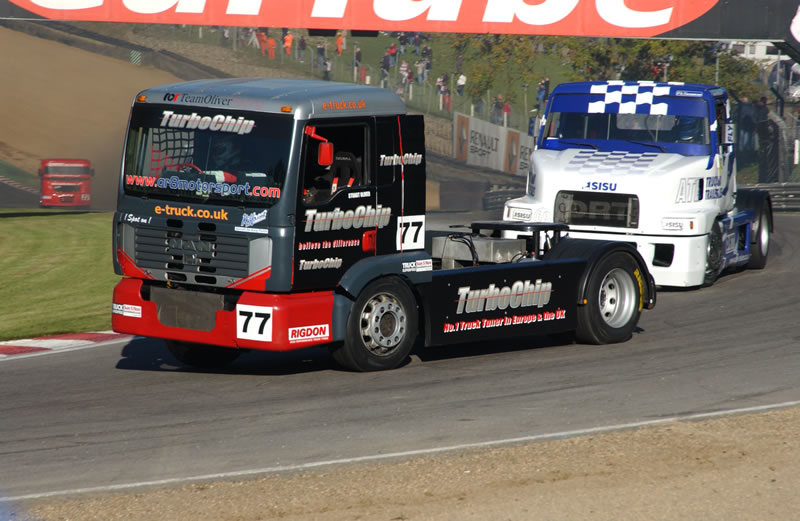
Truck Racing at Brands Hatch in 2006

The circuit also hosts a major events on the historic racing calendar on May Bank Holiday: the Masters Historic Festival.

Despite the curfew, the early evenings during the autumn months allow some racing to take place in darkness and the Britcar 'into the night' race has been a regular on the calendar, with the Lotus 1000 km reviving a tradition that started in the 1960s with the BOAC sportscar races.

The circuit has also launched a number of innovative themed festivals celebrating motorsport of different cultures, including the American SpeedFest, Festival Italia and Deutsche Fest. The American SpeedFest, launched in 2013, features the NASCAR Euro Series has become one of the venue's biggest events of the year. These festivals feature large off track entertainment areas, running concurrently with the on track racing.

== Events ==
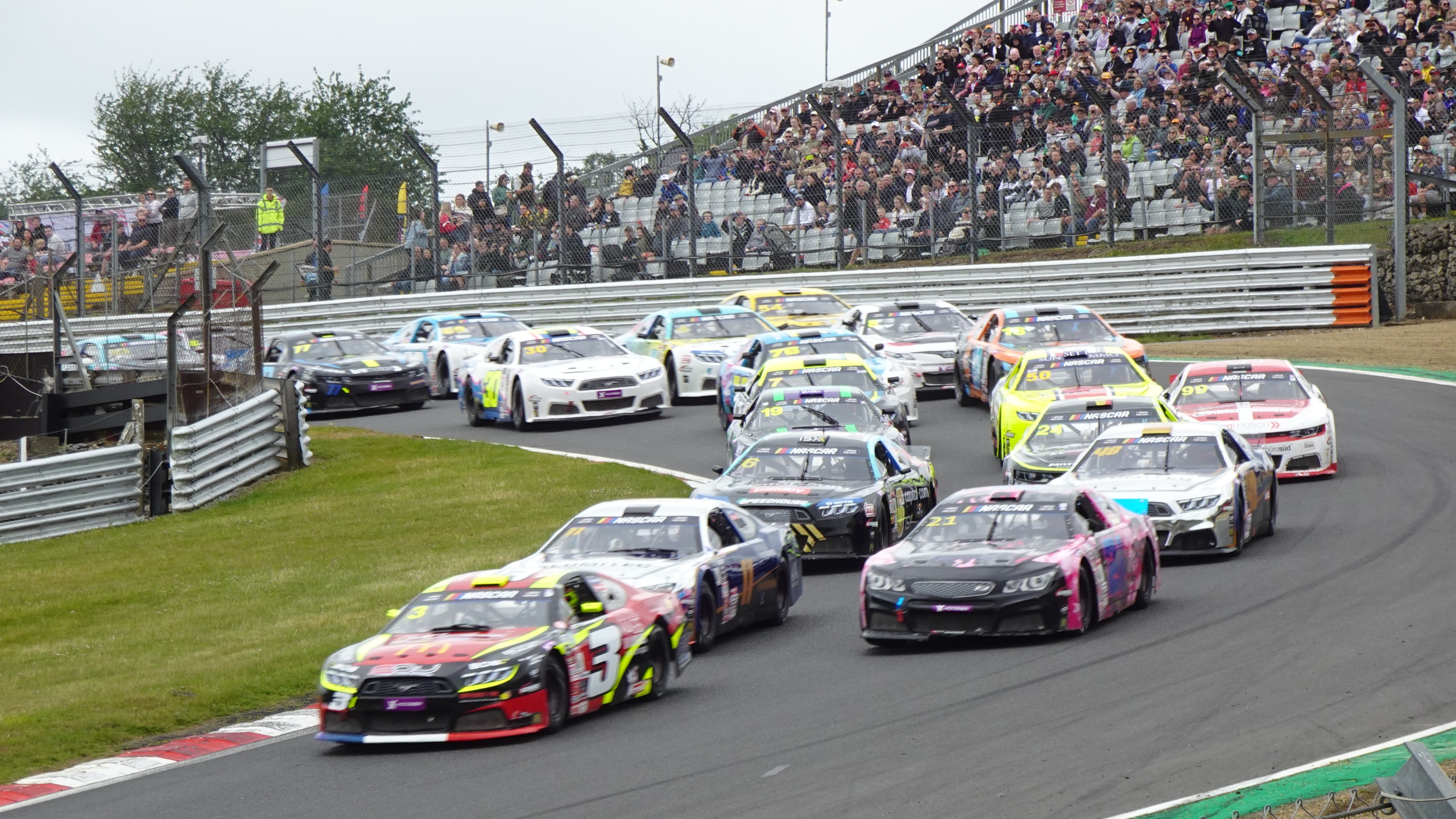
NASCAR Euro Series at Brands Hatch in 2026

Current

- 17 January: Brands Hatch Winter Stages (Protyre Circuit Rally Championship)
- 4–5 April: TCR UK Touring Car Championship
- 2–3 May: GT World Challenge Europe
- 9–10 May: British Touring Car Championship, Porsche Carrera Cup Great Britain, F4 British Championship
- 24–25 May: Brands Britannia
- 30–31 May: Masters Racing Legends Masters Historic Festival
- 6–7 June: NASCAR Euro Series American SpeedFest
- 19–21 June: London Historic Trophy
- 17–19 July: British Superbike Championship, British Supersport Championship, Moto4 British Cup
- 24–26 July: Ferrari Challenge UK
- 1–2 August: Touring Car Rewind:South
- 8–9 August: Festival Italia
- 22–23 August: Mini Festival
- 30–31 August: Brands Britannia
- 12–13 September: Ford Power Live
- 19–20 September: GT Cup Championship
- 25–27 September: British GT Championship, GB3 Championship, GB4 Championship
- 10–11 October: British Touring Car Championship, F4 British Championship, Porsche Carrera Cup Great Britain
- 16–18 October: British Superbike Championship, British Supersport Championship
- 24–25 October: Formula Ford Festival
- 31 October–1 November: TCR UK Touring Car Championship
- 7 November: Britcar Brands Hatch into the Night Race
- 14–15 November: EnduroKa

Future

- Formula E
  - London ePrix (2027)
- TCR World Tour (2027)

Former

- 2012 Summer Paralympics (2012)
- A1 Grand Prix (2005, 2007–2009)
- BPR Global GT Series (1996)
- Champ Car
  - London Champ Car Trophy (2003)
- Deutsche Tourenwagen Masters (2006–2013, 2018–2019)
- EuroBOSS Series (1996, 1998–2004, 2006, 2009)
- European F3 Open Championship (2010–2012)
- European Formula 5000 Championship (1969–1975)
- European Formula Two Championship (1967, 1984)
- European Touring Car Championship (1963–1964, 1978–1980)
- European Truck Racing Cup (1985–1994)
- FIA European Rallycross Championship (1982–1994)
- FIA Formula Two Championship (2009–2012)
- FIA Formula 3 European Championship (2012–2013)
- FIM Endurance World Championship (1966–1968, 1978–1979, 2001)
- Formula 3 Euro Series (2006–2010, 2012)
- Formula 750 (1977–1979)
- Formula One
  - British Grand Prix (1964, 1966, 1968, 1970, 1972, 1974, 1976, 1978, 1980, 1982, 1984, 1986)
  - European Grand Prix (1983, 1985)
- Formula Palmer Audi (1998–2010)
- Formula Renault Eurocup (2004–2007)
- GT4 European Series (2017–2019)
- International Formula 3000 (1987–1991)
- International Formula Master (2006–2009)
- International GT Open (2007, 2010–2012)
- McLaren Trophy Europe (2025)
- Motocross of Nations (1949, 1952, 1957)
- SEAT León Eurocup (2008–2010)
- Sidecar World Championship (1999–2003, 2005, 2007, 2015)
- Superbike World Championship (1993, 1995–2008)
- Superleague Formula (2010)
- Supersport World Championship (1997–2008)
- USAC Championship Car Series
  - London Champ Car Trophy (1978)
- W Series (2019)
- World Sportscar Championship (1967–1972, 1974, 1977, 1979–1982, 1984–1989)
- World Touring Car Championship
  - FIA WTCC Race of UK (2006–2010)

=== British Rallycross Grand Prix ===
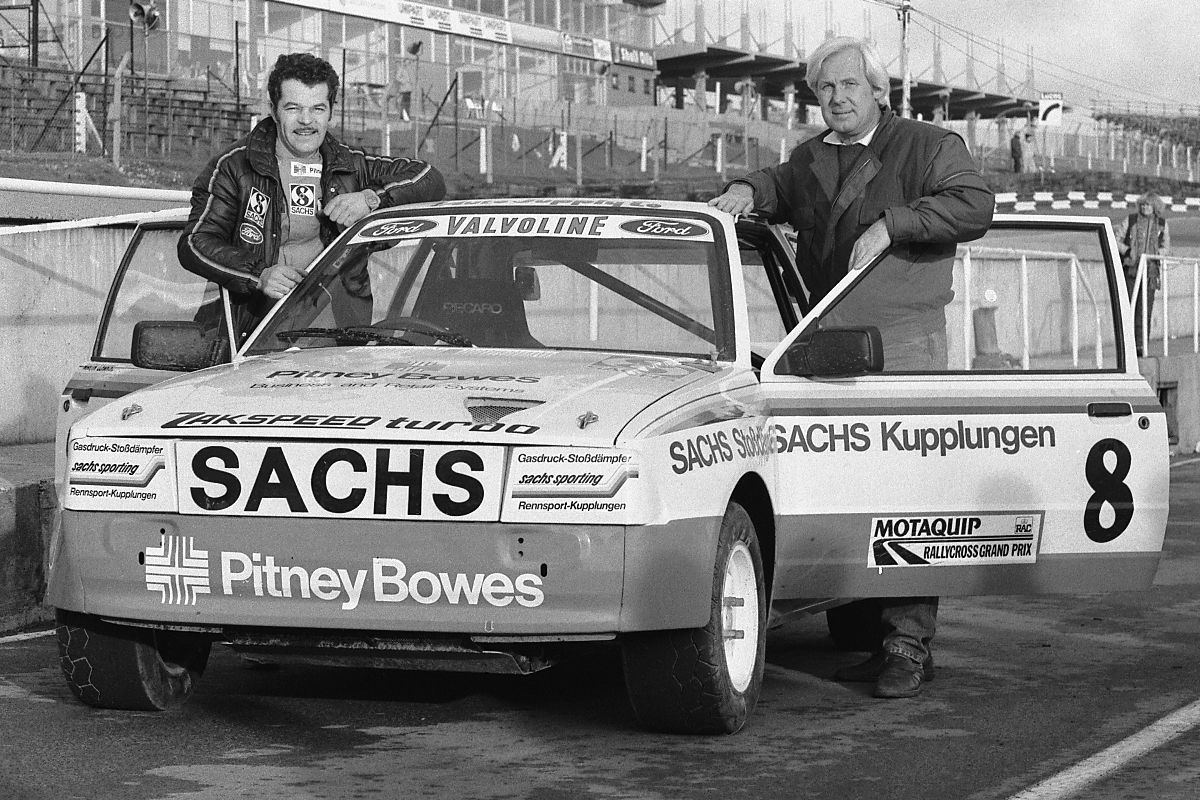
Martin Schanche and his Zakspeed engine supplier Erich Zakowski pictured with Schanche's brand new Ford Escort XR3 T16 4x4 (Xtrac) during the 1983 British Rallycross GP at the Brands Hatch Circuit

In the early 1980s, Rallycross was beginning to attract more sponsorship and enjoy a higher quality of competition, frequently broadcast on BBC Grandstand. The Rallycross Grand Prix ran at Brands Hatch between 1982 and 1994 and was an open competition for anyone who owned a Rallycross car. This led to an appealing race with eclectic mix of cars and drivers, most notably Denis Marcel's in a Matra Murena, Stig Blomqvist in his own Audi Quattro, and Cor Euser in a MG Metro 6R4. Also, the location of the circuit and the marketing effort of the organizers contributed to its success. In a popular move, Group B rally cars were permitted from 1987 until 1992.

Recent versions at Lydden Hill and Croft have not recaptured the magic of the original Grand Prix, which remain some of the sport's best ever.

=== Other events ===
View of the outer paddock

Aside from circuit racing, Single Stage Rally uses the tarmac and other inner sections of the circuit like the pits and other roads at the venue. The annual Modified Live and Race Car Live events also follow an exhibition format.

The circuit has hosted the Motocross of Nations three times.

In 2011, it also hosted one of the rounds of the Mini 7 Racing Club season.

During the week the circuit offers some general test days and driving experiences, and can also be hired out for private testing and track days.

Since 2015, Brands Hatch hosts the Revolve24 Circuit Challenge, an ultra-distance cycling event featuring 24-hour, 12-hour and 6-hour races for soloists and relay teams up to 8 riders.

=== 2012 Summer Paralympics ===
In September 2012, Brands Hatch was the base for the road cycling events of the 2012 Summer Paralympics. Riders raced around a course that starts and finishes at Brands Hatch and encompasses both the circuit and local roads surrounding it.

Notably, the men's H4 time trial and road race were won by Italy's Alex Zanardi, a racing driver who had extensive experience as a driver at the track. Zanardi first drove at Brands Hatch in 1991 in the Formula 3000 series, and had last driven at the track in the World Touring Car Championship in 2009 – eight years after losing both legs in a near-fatal 2001 racing accident during a CART FedEx Championship Series race in Germany.

== Layout history ==
Original Circuit (1950–1953)

Grand Prix Circuit (1954–1959) & Club Circuit (1960–1975)

Grand Prix Circuit (1960–1975)

Grand Prix Circuit (1976–1987)

Grand Prix Circuit (1988–1998)

Grand Prix Circuit (1999–2002)

Grand Prix Circuit (2003–present)

Indy Circuit (2003–present)

== Records ==
The unofficial all-time track record set during a race weekend on the Grand Prix Circuit configuration is 1:06.961, set by Nelson Piquet in a Williams FW11, during qualifying for the second (final) qualifying for the 1986 British Grand Prix. The outright lap record for the Grand Prix configuration is 1:09.593, set by Nigel Mansell in his Williams FW11 at the circuit's last Formula One Grand Prix in July 1986, although changes to the circuit over winter of 2002 for the 2003 season means that the lap record in its current configuration was set by Adam Carroll with A1GP Powered by Ferrari car in the 2009 Brands Hatch A1GP round with a lap time of 01:12.276. The record on the shorter Indy Circuit layout is 0:38.032 seconds, set by Scott Mansell with a Benetton B197 Judd during the 2004 EuroBOSS season.

On two wheels the outright lap record for the Grand Prix configuration is 1:24.066, set by Kyle Ryde, riding a Ducati Panigale V4 R in the July 2026 round of the British Superbike Championship. Bradley Ray holds the two wheel lap record on the Indy Circuit at 0:45.201 seconds. He set this on his Suzuki GSX-R1000 at the April round of the 2018 British Superbike Championship.

In DTM, Miguel Molina set a time on the Indy Circuit of 0:41.896 in an Audi A4 DTM 2008, with Ander Vilariño setting a laptime in the 2013 NASCAR Whelen Euro Series season of 0:49.032 in his Chevrolet Camaro, and Tom Ingram setting a time of 0:47.157 in the Hyundai i30 BTCC. At the 2010 Brands Hatch Superleague Formula round, Craig Dolby set a time of 1:13.460. In GT3, Raffaele Marciello drove a lap of 1:22.557 in a Mercedes-AMG GT3 Evo. In the 2007 FIA WTCC Race of UK, Yvan Muller drove his SEAT León for a time of 1:33.980. After DTM switched to the GP layout for the DTM in 2018, Philipp Eng set the fastest DTM lap of 1:17.862 in 2019.

As of October 2026, the fastest official race lap records at the Brands Hatch are listed as:

Category	Time	Driver	Vehicle	Event	Circuit Map
Grand Prix Circuit (2003–present): 3.916 km (2.433 mi)
A1GP	1:12.276	Adam Carroll	A1GP Powered by Ferrari car	2009 Brands Hatch A1GP round	
Superleague Formula	1:13.460	Craig Dolby	Panoz DP09	2010 Brands Hatch Superleague Formula round	
F2 (2009–2012)	1:15.828	Christopher Zanella	Williams JPH1B	2012 Brands Hatch FTwo round	
GB3	1:17.057	Deagen Fairclough (Note: Same driver took the same lap time in both races of this round.)	Tatuus MSV GB3-025	2026 Brands Hatch GB3 round	
Formula Three	1:17.443	Oliver Webb	Dallara F308	2010 Brands Hatch British F3 round	
Class 1 Touring Cars	1:17.862	Philipp Eng	BMW M4 Turbo DTM	2019 Brands Hatch DTM round	
Formula 3000	1:18.305	Jaroslav Janiš	Lola B02/50	2006 Brands Hatch F3000 Masters round	
DTM	1:19.943	Paul di Resta	Mercedes-AMG C63 DTM	2018 Brands Hatch DTM round	
Formula One	1:21.254	Nick Padmore	Williams FW07C	2018 Masters Historic Festival	
GT3	1:22.557	Raffaele Marciello	Mercedes-AMG GT3 Evo	2022 Brands Hatch GT World Challenge Europe round	
Formula Regional	1:23.301	Emma Kimiläinen	Tatuus F3 T-318	2019 Brands Hatch W Series round	
Formula Palmer Audi	1:23.736	Kieran Vernon	Formula Palmer Audi car	2010 2nd Brands Hatch Formula Palmer Audi round	
GB4	1:23.895	Isaac Phelps	Tatuus MSV GB4-025	2025 Brands Hatch GB4 round	
Superbike	1:24.066	Kyle Ryde	Ducati Panigale V4 R	2026 1st Brands Hatch BSB round	
Formula 4	1:24.397	Deagen Fairclough	Tatuus F4-T421	2024 2nd Brands Hatch British F4 round	
GT2	1:25.654	Patrick Pilet	Porsche 911 (997) GT3 RSR	2010 Brands Hatch International GT Open round	
Ferrari Challenge	1:26.255	Gilbert Yates	Ferrari 296 Challenge	2025 Brands Hatch Ferrari Challenge UK round	
World SBK	1:26.351	James Toseland	Honda CBR1000RR	2006 Brands Hatch World SBK round	
Porsche Carrera Cup	1:26.539	Callum Voisin	Porsche 911 (992 I) GT3 Cup	2026 2nd Brands Hatch Porsche Carrera Cup GB round	
Supersport	1:27.101	Eugene McManus	Ducati Panigale V2	2025 2nd Brands Hatch BSS round	
World SSP	1:28.399	Andrew Pitt	Honda CBR600RR	2008 Brands Hatch World SSP round	
GT4	1:29.045	Will Jenkins	Porsche 718 Cayman GT4 RS Clubsport	2024 Brands Hatch Porsche Sprint Challenge Great Britain round	
Formula BMW	1:29.323	Dean Smith	Mygale FB02	2005 2nd Brands Hatch Formula BMW UK round	
NGTC	1:29.596	Tom Ingram	Hyundai i30 Fastback N Performance	2025 2nd Brands Hatch BTCC round	
Sportbike	1:30.938	Ferre Fleerackers	Suzuki GSX-8R	2026 1st Brands Hatch British Sportbike round	
BTC Touring	1:33.148	Rob Collard	BTC-T MG ZS EX259	2005 2nd Brands Hatch BTCC round	
BMW F900R Cup	1:33.642	Barry Burrell	BMW F900R	2026 1st Brands Hatch BMW F900R Cup round	
Super 2000	1:33.980	Yvan Muller	SEAT León TDI WTCC	2007 FIA WTCC Race of UK	
SEAT León Eurocup	1:34.971	Tom Boardman	SEAT León Supercopa	2008 Brands Hatch SEAT León Eurocup round	
Moto3	1:35.237	Jack Dunabie	Honda NSF250R	2025 Brands Hatch British Talent Cup round	
Indy Circuit (2003–present): 1.944 km (1.208 mi)
EuroBOSS/F1	0:38.032	Scott Mansell	Benetton B197 Judd	2004 Brands Hatch EuroBOSS round	
CART	0:38.210	Adrián Fernández	Lola B02/00	2003 London Champ Car Trophy	
Formula Three	0:40.953	Marco Wittmann	Dallara F308	2010 Brands Hatch F3 Euro Series round	
DTM	0:41.896	Miguel Molina	Audi A4 DTM 2008	2010 Brands Hatch DTM round	
Formula Palmer Audi	0:44.637	José Alonso Liste	Formula Palmer Audi car	2010 1st Brands Hatch Formula Palmer Audi round	
Formula 4	0:44.929	Alex Dunne	Tatuus F4-T421	2022 1st Brands Hatch British F4 round	
Superbike	0:45.201	Bradley Ray	Suzuki GSX-R1000	2018 1st Brands Hatch BSB round	
BRDC F4	0:45.364	Will Palmer	Tatuus MSV F4-013	2015 2nd Brands Hatch BRDC F4 round	
Superkart	0:45.470	John Riley	Division 1 Superkart	2005 Brands Hatch Indy British Superkart round	
Porsche Carrera Cup	0:45.821	Robert de Haan	Porsche 911 (992 I) GT3 Cup	2023 1st Brands Hatch Porsche Carrera Cup GB round	
Ferrari Challenge	0:46.065	Pranav Vangala	Ferrari 296 Challenge	2025 Brands Hatch Ferrari Challenge UK round	
Supersport	0:46.176	Kyle Ryde	Yamaha YZF-R6	2015 1st Brands Hatch BSS round	
GT3	0:46.622	Martin Short	Mosler MT900R GT Cup	2010 Brands Hatch Britcar GT round	
Formula BMW	0:46.762	Euan Hankey	Mygale FB02	2006 1st Brands Hatch Formula BMW UK round	
NGTC	0:47.157	Tom Ingram	Hyundai i30 Fastback N Performance	2025 1st Brands Hatch BTCC round	
GT4	0:47.161	Toby Trice	Porsche 718 Cayman GT4 RS Clubsport	2025 1st Brands Hatch Porsche Sprint Challenge Great Britain round	
N-GT	0:47.434	Nathan Kinch	Ferrari 360 Modena GTC	2004 Brands Hatch British GT round	
TCR Touring Car	0:48.148	Maximus Hall	Honda Civic Type R TCR (FL5)	2026 1st Brands Hatch TCR UK round	
Stock car racing	0:48.653	Gianmarco Ercoli	Ford Mustang NASCAR	2026 NASCAR GP UK - American SpeedFest 13	
Super 2000	0:48.898	Rob Collard	BMW 320si	2010 2nd Brands Hatch BTCC round	
BTC Touring	0:49.190	Tom Chilton	BTC-T Vauxhall Astra Sport Hatch	2006 1st Brands Hatch BTCC round	
Truck racing	0:58.066	Ryan Smith	Daimler Freightliner	2023 1st Brands Hatch BTRC round	
Grand Prix Circuit (1999–2002): 4.221 km (2.623 mi)
EuroBOSS/F1	1:16.170	Tony Worswick	Jordan 194 Judd	2001 Brands Hatch EuroBOSS round	
Formula Three	1:18.372	Takuma Sato	Dallara F301	2001 1st Brands Hatch British F3 round	
GT1	1:22.750	Chris Goodwin	McLaren F1 GTR	1999 Brands Hatch British GT round	
World SBK	1:26.690	Troy Bayliss	Ducati 998 F 02	2002 Brands Hatch World SBK round	
Formula Palmer Audi	1:26.987	Richard Meaden	Formula Palmer Audi car	2001 1st Brands Hatch Formula Palmer Audi round	
Super Touring	1:28.935	Anthony Reid	Ford Mondeo Zetec	2000 1st Brands Hatch BTCC round	
World SSP	1:30.095	Iain MacPherson	Honda CBR600F	2002 Brands Hatch World SSP round	
BTC Touring	1:33.262	Yvan Muller	BTC-T Vauxhall Astra Coupe	2002 1st Brands Hatch BTCC round	
Grand Prix Circuit (1988–1998): 4.182 km (2.599 mi)
Formula 3000	1:13.860	Emanuele Naspetti	Reynard 91D	1991 Brands Hatch F3000 round	
Group C	1:15.820	Jean-Louis Schlesser	Sauber C9	1988 1000 km of Brands Hatch	
Formula Three	1:18.085	Mark Webber	Dallara F397	1997 Brands Hatch British F3 round	
Group C2	1:18.880	Gordon Spice	Spice SE88C	1988 1000 km of Brands Hatch	
IMSA GTP	1:20.747	David Kennedy	Mazda 767B	1989 480 km of Brands Hatch	
GT1	1:23.179	Hans-Joachim Stuck	Porsche 911 GT1	1996 BPR 4 Hours of Brands Hatch	
GT2	1:25.829	Detlef Hübner	Porsche 911 GT2	1996 BPR 4 Hours of Brands Hatch	
World SBK	1:26.164	Jamie Whitham	Suzuki GSX-R750	1998 Brands Hatch World SBK round	
Super Touring	1:28.930	Alain Menu	Renault Laguna BTCC	1996 2nd Brands Hatch BTCC round	
World SSP	1:30.238	Stéphane Chambon	Suzuki GSX-R600	1998 Brands Hatch World SSP round	
Group A	1:32.340	Robb Gravett	Ford Sierra RS500 Cosworth	1990 2nd Brands Hatch BTCC round	
Indy Circuit (1976–1998): 1.937 km (1.204 mi)
Formula 3000	0:38.760	Luiz Garcia Jr.	Reynard 95D	1996 1st Brands Hatch British F2 round	
Group C1	0:39.400	Bernd Schneider	Porsche 962C	1991 Brands Hatch Interserie round	
Formula Three	0:40.763	Marc Hynes	Dallara F398	1998 Brands Hatch British F3 round	
Sports 2000	0:41.010	Walter Lechner	Lola Horag VAG Can-Am Turbo	1992 Brands Hatch Interserie round	
USAC IndyCar	0:41.400	Danny Ongais	Parnelli VPJ6B	1978 Daily Mail Indy Trophy	
Group C2	0:41.880	Richard Piper	Spice SE89C	1990 Brands Hatch Interserie Cup	
C Sports	0:44.320	Paul Cope	Lola T594C	1989 Brands Hatch Thundersports	
Super Touring	0:44.674	Anthony Reid	Nissan Primera GT	1997 2nd Brands Hatch BTCC round	
Superbike	0:45.520	Niall Mackenzie	Yamaha YZF750	1998 1st Brands Hatch BSB round	
Can-Am	0:45.740	Robin Smith	March 827	1989 Brands Hatch Thundersports	
Group A	0:48.450	Andy Rouse	Ford Sierra RS500 Cosworth	1990 1st Brands Hatch BTCC round	
Grand Prix Circuit (1976–1987): 4.207 km (2.614 mi)
Formula One	1:09.593	Nigel Mansell	Williams FW11	1986 British Grand Prix	
Group C	1:16.440	Jan Lammers	Jaguar XJR-8	1987 1000 km of Brands Hatch	
Formula 3000	1:17.330	Yannick Dalmas	March 87B	1987 Brands Hatch F3000 round	
Formula Two	1:18.570	Roberto Moreno	Ralt RH6/84	1984 Brands Hatch F2 round	
Group C2	1:24.350	Will Hoy	Argo JM19B	1987 1000 km of Brands Hatch	
Formula Three	1:24.720	Enrique Mansilla	Ralt RT3	1982 Brands Hatch British F3 round	
Group 6	1:25.420	Reinhold Jöst	Porsche 908/3 Turbo	1980 Brands Hatch 6 Hours	
Group 5	1:26.250	Jacky Ickx	Porsche 935/77	1977 Brands Hatch 6 Hours	
BMW M1 Procar	1:30.300	Didier Pironi	BMW M1 Procar	1980 Brands Hatch BMW M1 Procar round	
Group A	1:37.580	Jean-Louis Schlesser	Rover Vitesse	1986 1st Brands Hatch BSCC round	
Grand Prix Circuit (1960–1975): 4.265 km (2.650 mi)
Formula One	1:21.100	Niki Lauda (Note: Both drivers took the same lap time in different races independently.); Tom Pryce	Ferrari 312B3; Shadow DN5	1974 British Grand Prix; 1975 Race of Champions	
Group 5	1:22.500	Jean-Pierre Jarier	Matra-Simca MS670C	1974 Brands Hatch 1000 km	
Formula 5000	1:22.800	Alan Jones	March 75A	1975 Brands Hatch Shellsport Motorshow 200	
Formula Two	1:27.000	Peter Westbury	Brabham BT30	1971 Rothmans International Trophy	
Group 6	1:27.700	John Hine	Chevron B31	1975 Brands Hatch European 2-Litre Championship round	
Group 5 sports car	1:29.200	Pedro Rodríguez	Porsche 917K	1970 1000km of Brands Hatch	
Group 4	1:37.200	Denny Hulme	Lola T70 Mk.IIIB GT	1967 Brands Hatch 6 Hours	
Group 3	1:46.400	Jack Sears	AC Cobra	1963 Brands Hatch Grand Prix GT round	
Group 2	2:04.000	Denny Hulme	Jaguar Mark II 3.8	1963 Brands Hatch 6 Hours	
Club Circuit (1954–1975): 1.995 km (1.240 mi)
Group 5	0:49.600	Alan Fowler	Mercury Mk.3-Ford	1972 Brands Hatch MN GT round	
Group 4	0:51.800	Terry Croker	Chevron B8	1969 Brands Hatch STP round	
Prototype	0:52.200	Brian Martin	Martin BM7	1970 Brands Hatch SKF GT round	
Formula Libre	0:54.200	Allan Rollinson	Brabham BT14	1965 Brands Hatch B.A.R.C. Formula Libre round	
Sports car	0:55.200	Jack Murrell	D.R.W.-Ford	1968 Brands Hatch sports car round	
Clubman	0:56.200	John Wingfield	Mallock U2	1969 B.R.S.C.C. Brands Hatch Clubman round	
Open-wheel sports car	0:57.000	Barry Foley	Lotus Seven	1968 Brands Hatch sports car round	
Group 3	0:58.000	John Harris	Lotus Elan	1966 B.A.R.C. Brands Hatch GT round	
Formula Two	0:59.400	Jack Brabham	Cooper T41	1956 National Brands Hatch F2 round	

== In popular culture ==
Brands Hatch has appeared in several pieces of media, ranging from film to television and racing video games.

Racing films that have utilized Brands Hatch include:

- Grand Prix (1966) – Brands Hatch is used specifically for the 1966 British Grand Prix.
- Rush (2013) – Brands Hatch appeared in the film several times representing multiple circuits such as Monza. It was also used for the 1976 British Grand Prix where James Hunt won at Brands Hatch but was later disqualified.
- F1 (2025) – Brands Hatch was used as a stand-in for 1993 footage of Jerez and the fiery crash scene in the Italian Grand Prix.

Non-racing films and television series that have used Brands Hatch include CI5: The New Professionals (1999), The Saint (1967) and My Fault: London (2025).

It has appeared in multiple video games. In F1 2013, it appeared as a classic track appearing in the game with other classic circuits such as Estoril, Jerez and Imola. Within the Gran Turismo series, the circuit appears in Gran Turismo 6, Gran Turismo 7 and Gran Turismo Sport. In Forza Motorsport, the track has appeared in all iterations since Forza Motorsport 6. Other notable games include iRacing, Shift 2: Unleashed, Assetto Corsa Competizione and Automobilista 2.

== Fatalities ==
- Graeme Ritchie - 1997 Superbike World Championship
- Craig Jones - 2008 Supersport World Championship
- Henry Surtees - 2009 FIA Formula Two Championship

== See also ==
- Brands Hatch Circuit fatal accidents
