= Graeme Ritchie =

Scottish motorcycle racer (1957–1997)

Personal information
- Born: 7 December 1957 Aberdeen, Scotland
- Died: 8 August 1997 (aged 39) West Kingsdown, Kent, United Kingdom

Sport
- Country: Scotland
- Sport: Motorcycle racing

Graeme Ritchie (7 December 1957 – 8 August 1997) was a Scottish motorcycle road racer. He was born in Aberdeen and went to school at Robert Gordon's College.

Ritchie then moved to London where he got a job as a mechanic. He also studied architecture for two years before dropping out to carry on his dream to become a motorbike racer. He started racing in the British Superbike Championship in 1993. In 1995, he competed in the British round of the Superbike World Championship. In the 1997 Superbike World Championship season, Ritchie again competed in the British round at Brands Hatch on 3 August, as a privateer riding a Ducati 888. On the second lap, Ritchie's mudguard exploded, causing the Ducati's brake line to be severed. He was unable to slow down and crashed into a tire barrier, sustaining severe head and chest injuries. He was then airlifted to the Royal London Hospital. Ritchie died from his injuries on 8 August 1997.
