= Martin BM7 =

2-liter sports prototype race car

The Martin BM7, and its successor and derivative, the Martin BM8, are 2-liter sports prototype race cars, designed, developed, and built by British racing driver, automotive engineer, and mechanic, Brian Martin, in 1969 and 1970, respectively. They were constructed to compete in the European 2-Litre Championship sports car racing series. These cars were powered by a number of different engines (all four-cylinder engines), including a BMW M12/7, a Ford Motor Company-Cosworth FVC, and a Ford-Cosworth BDX, which all displaced around 2.0 L (120 cu in). These cars won a total of 8 races (plus 3 additional class wins), and scored 20 podium finishes.
