= Lotus 51 =

Lotus Formula Ford racing car

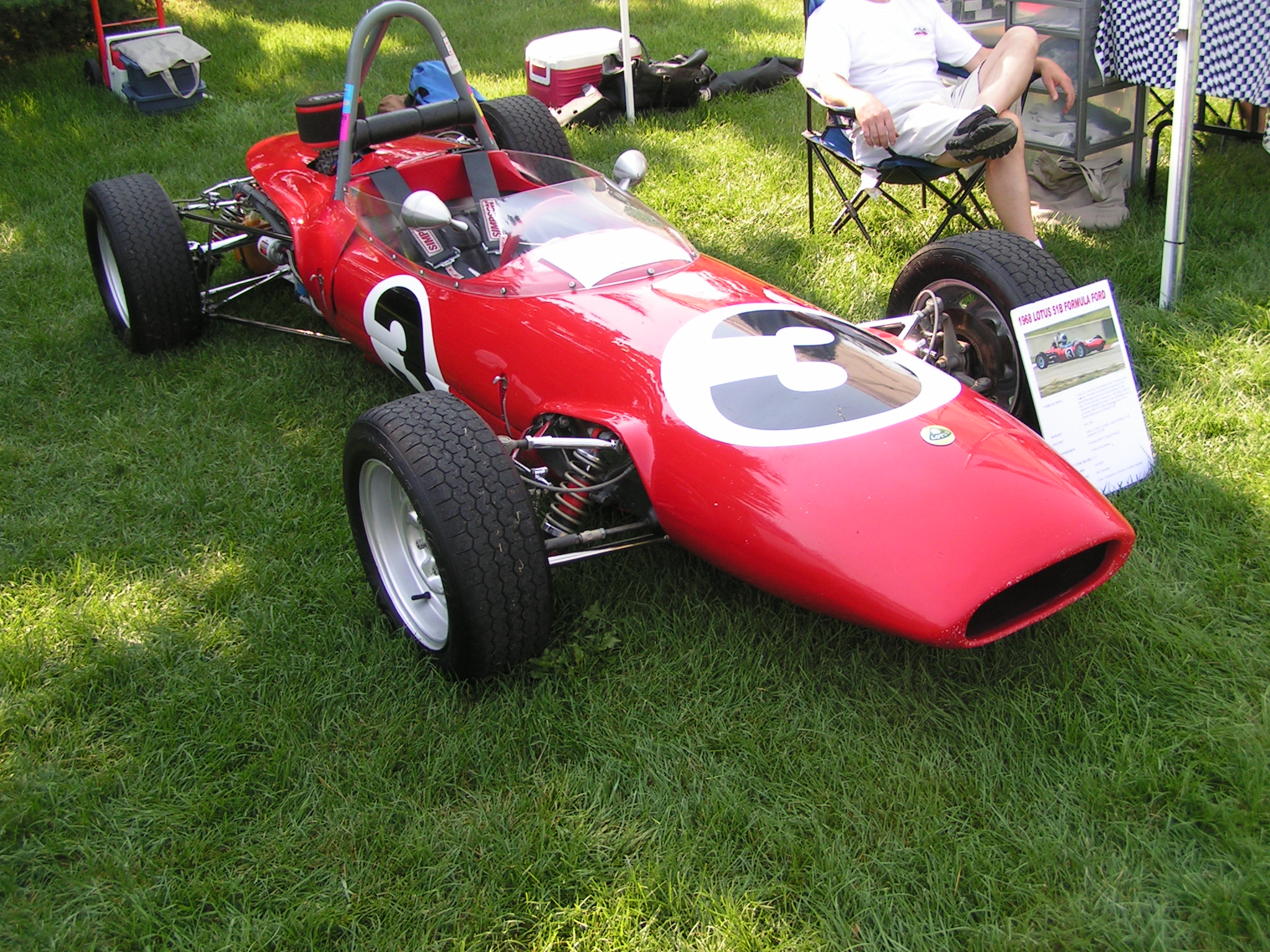
1968 Lotus 51

The Lotus 51 was an open-wheel Formula Ford race car built in 1967 by the British motorsport team Lotus. It was powered by a 1.6 L (98 cu in) Ford Crossflow four-cylinder engine (the same type of engine used in the Ford Cortina), developing a respectable 110 hp (82 kW), which drove the rear wheels through either a Renault R-8 type 330 4-speed, or a Hewland 5-speed manual transmission.

The Lotus 51 became a bestseller for Colin Chapman and the Lotus team in 1967. 218 vehicles were built and sold (some sources speak of only 150 vehicles). The price for one vehicle was £955.

The car was derived from, and based on, the Lotus 31, a Formula 3 car from Lotus. The racing car was agile and fast, had a short wheelbase, and was extremely light with a curb weight of 900 lb (410 kg). In 1969 the car was replaced by the Lotus 61. In 1968 the 51R - a one-off - was built. The car had wider sidepods and was originally intended as a concept for a successor. The car was sold for £1095 to a US collector who never entered the 51R in racing competitions.
