= Mercury Mk.II / Mk.III =

Sports prototype racecars

The Mercury Mk.II, and its successor, the Mercury Mk.III, were two-litre sports prototype race cars, designed, developed, built and raced by Alan Fowler in the British Sports Car Championship sports car racing series, between 1971 and 1972. It did score any race wins, but managed to clinch 3 podium finishes, all while driven by Fowler. It was powered by a 1.8 L (110 cu in) Cosworth FVC naturally aspirated four-cylinder engine, producing around 235 hp (175 kW).
