= Lighthorne Heath =

Village and civil parish in Warwickshire, England

Coordinates: 52.199°N 1.488°W

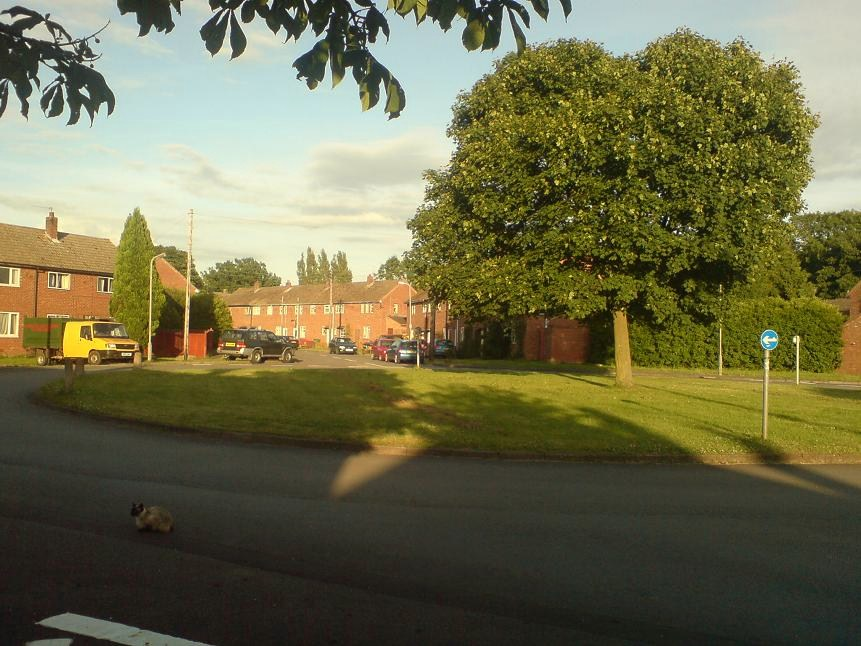

- Location within Warwickshire
- Population: 898 (2011)
- OS grid reference: SP 351 588
- Civil parish: Upper Lighthorne
- District: Stratford-on-Avon
- Shire county: Warwickshire
- Region: West Midlands
- Country: England
- Sovereign state: United Kingdom
- Post town: Leamington Spa
- Postcode district: CV33
- Post town: Warwick
- Postcode district: CV35
- Dialling code: 01926
- Police: Warwickshire
- Fire: Warwickshire
- Ambulance: West Midlands
- UK Parliament: Kenilworth and Southam

Lighthorne Heath is a village in the civil parish of Upper Lighthorne, in Stratford-on-Avon District, Warwickshire, England. The parish boundaries of Upper Lighthorne - a name chosen in 2019 - have been set to encompass the existing Lighthorne Heath and provide several thousand planned new homes. Lighthorne Heath is located some six miles to the south east of Leamington Spa and is very close to the M40 motorway.

== History ==
The village was established in the 1950s, situated to the north of RAF Gaydon it housed the married airmen and officers (those unmarried lived in barracks). Before that time the site was just farmland between Gaydon and Lighthorne with a few isolated buildings. After just over thirty years of active service most of the smaller houses on the base were sold off to Stratford District Council between 1976 and 1981. Throughout the 1980s the larger houses were sold on the open market by the Ministry of Defence. The runway and RAF buildings were taken over in 1978 by British Leyland, and became a proving ground for its cars. This evolved into the Gaydon centre (where Land Rover has its headquarters) and the British Motor Museum, a museum of many British cars. More recently Aston Martin built a factory here for its car production.

A parish council was established in 2003. Before 2003 it shared a Parish Council with Lighthorne, a village 800m to the west. According to the 2011 Census Lighthorne Heath parish had a population of 898 living in 370 households. It is possible that Office for National Statistics has used incorrect parish boundaries to compile their statistics. The village has had a primary school for many years. The school used to be called Gaydon Primary School but changed its name to Lighthorne Heath Primary School in the 1990s. Lighthorne Heath is part of the Mid-Fosse parishes which consist of a benefice of four parishes: Chesterton, Lighthorne, Moreton Morrell and Ashorne & Newbold Pacey. The Lighthorne Heath Community Church hold a Cafe Church style service based on the principles of the Fresh Expressions movement.

== Governance ==
The village is in the Westminster parliamentary constituency of Kenilworth and Southam. The village is part of the Harbury ward of Stratford-on-Avon District Council.

On 1 April 2020 the parish was renamed from "Lighthorne Heath" to "Upper Lighthorne".
