= Scharlau =

Scharlau is a German language habitational surname. Notable people with the name include:

- Charles E. Scharlau (1845–1903), American soldier
- Winfried Scharlau (1940–2020), German mathematician
