= Newbold Pacey =

Village in Warwickshire, England

Coordinates: 52.212130°N 1.5691942°W

- St George's Church

- Location within Warwickshire
- Area: 7.49 km^{2} (2.89 sq mi)
- Population: 267 (2011 census)
  - Density: 36/km^{2} (93/sq mi)
- Civil parish: Newbold Pacey
- District: Stratford-on-Avon
- Shire county: Warwickshire
- Region: West Midlands
- Country: England
- Sovereign state: United Kingdom
- Police: Warwickshire
- Fire: Warwickshire
- Ambulance: West Midlands
- Website: http://www.npapc.co.uk/

Newbold Pacey is a village and civil parish 5 miles (8 km) south of Warwick, in the Stratford-on-Avon district of Warwickshire, England. The parish includes the hamlet of Ashorne and the parish council is called "Newbold Pacey & Ashorne Parish Council". In 2011, the parish had a population of 267. The parish touches Bishop's Tachbrook, Charlecote, Chesterton and Kingston, Lighthorne, Moreton Morrell, Wasperton and Wellesbourne and Walton. Newbold Pacey is within a conservation area.

== History ==
The name "Newbold" means 'New building', the "Pacy" part from the de Pasci family. Newbold Pacey was recorded in the Domesday Book as Niwebold.

== Features ==
There are 20 listed buildings in Newbold Pacey. Newbold Pacey has a church called St George.
