= Sittig =

Sittig is a surname. Notable people with the surname include:

- Dale Sittig (born 1940), American politician
- Dean F. Sittig (born 1961), American biomedical informatician
- Eugene A. Sittig (1847–1907), American publisher and politician
- John Sittig (1905–1984), American middle-distance runner
- Lynne Cossman also known as Jeralynn Sittig Cossman, American academic
- Stefan Sittig (born 1972), American theatre director and choreographer
