= 1885 United States Senate election in Illinois =

- February 18–May 19, 1885

Majority of General Assembly needed to win
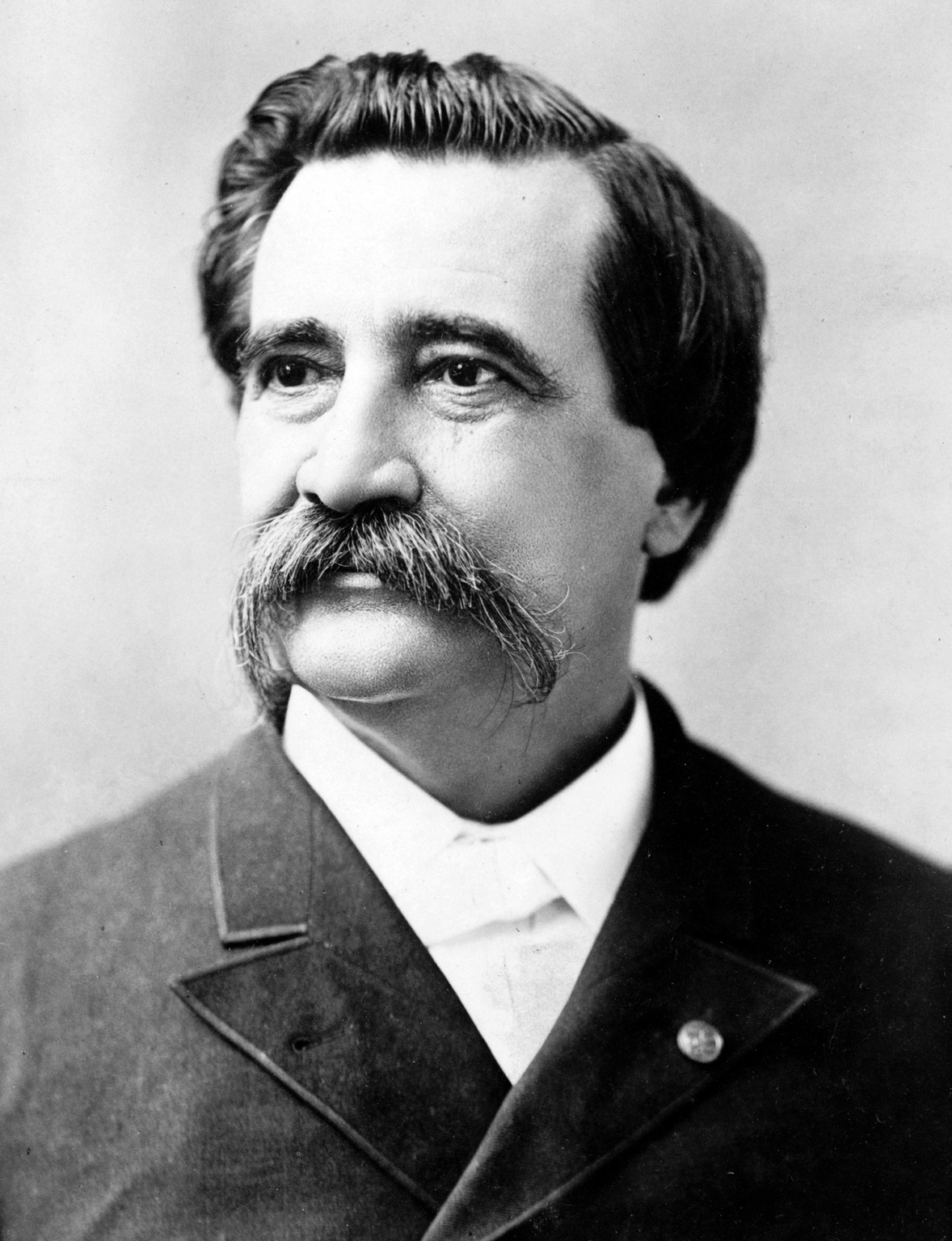

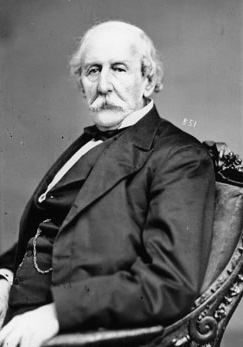
Nominee	John A. Logan	Lambert Tree
Party	Republican	Democratic
Electoral vote	103	96
Percentage	50.49%	47.06%
Senator before election
John A. Logan
Republican
Elected Senator
John A. Logan
Republican

The 1885 United States Senate election in Illinois was held from February 18 to May 19, 1885. The contentious election was determined by a joint session of the Illinois General Assembly. Incumbent Republican United States Senator John A. Logan, seeking a third term (second consecutive) in the United States Senate, was unanimously nominated by a Republican caucus. However, some assemblymen expressed concern about the candidate and abstained from supporting him.

Logan initially faced off against Democrat William Ralls Morrison, who was nominated during a legislative session. When the election began on February 18, the assembly combined for 102 Republicans and a coalition of 102 supporting the Democrats, thus producing a stalemate. For the next two months, elections were held to no avail during joint sessions. On April 12, a Democratic representative died and a Republican candidate won the special election to replace him. This angered Democrats, who tired of Morrison's lack of appeal and nominated Judge Lambert Tree in his place. After three months, the last holdout, Independent Senator William H. Ruger of Chicago, consented to follow the Republican party, and Logan was elected with 103 of the 204 votes.

== Background ==
In 1884, Logan was the Republican nominee for Vice President of the United States. After the GOP ticket lost the general election to Democrats Grover Cleveland and Thomas A. Hendricks, Logan blamed disloyalty by supporters of President Chester A. Arthur's bid for the Republican nomination. Logan obstructed Arthur's nomination of Chicago Inter-Ocean journalist William Eleroy Curtis to be Secretary of the Latin American Trade Commission, claiming that Curtis had made “damaging disclosures... to the Democratic National Committee.” Curtis threatened to mobilize his press allies against Logan's re-election, and the controversy eventually dissipated.

== Early voting ==
=== Republican caucus ===
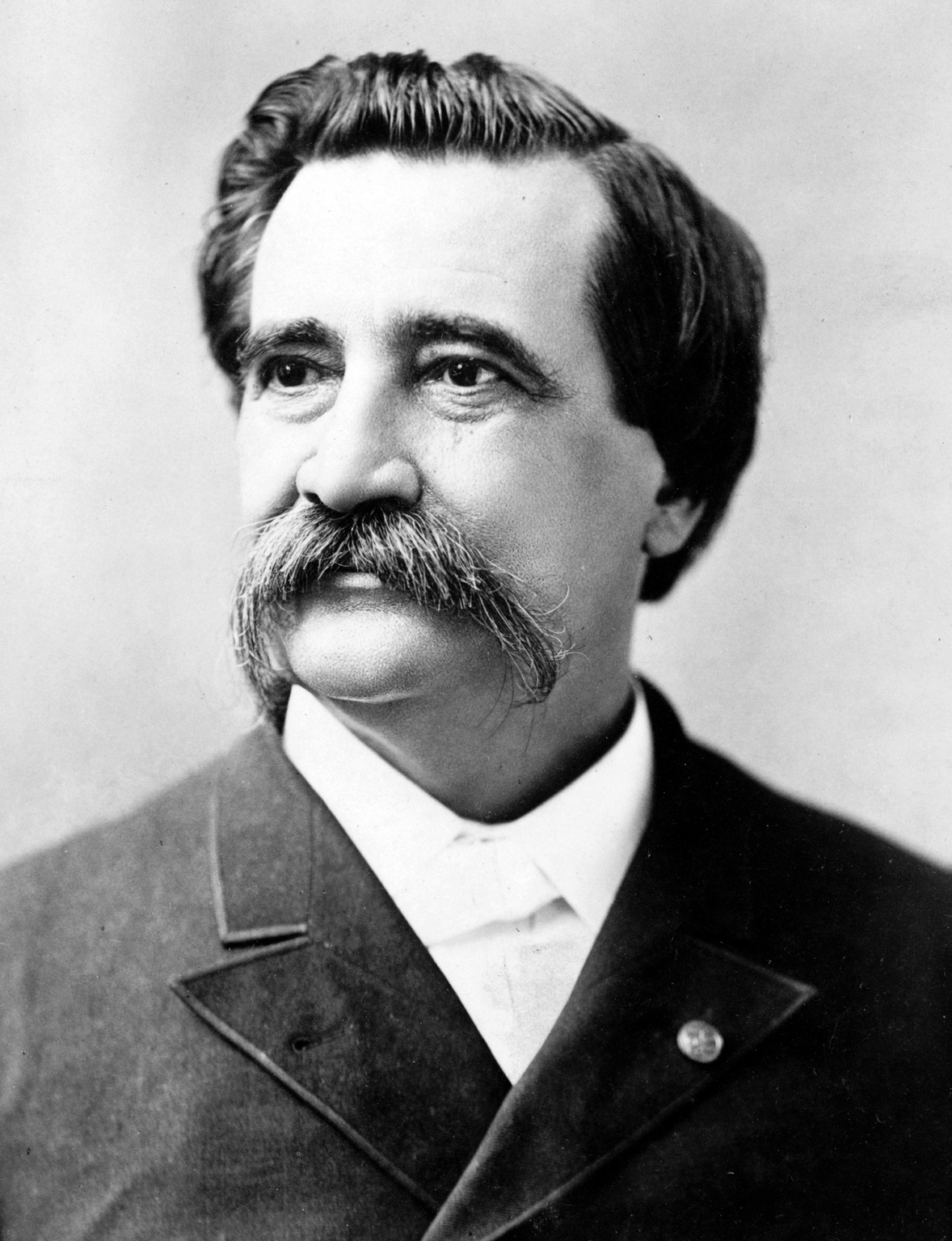
Republican candidate General John A. Logan

On February 5, 1885, a Republican senatorial caucus was held in the Leland Hotel in Springfield, Illinois. The meeting sought to determine the party's candidate for the US Senate seat currently held by Republican John A. Logan. President of the Illinois Bar Association Melville Fuller presided over the meeting and US Representative William E. Mason was elected chairman. Daniel Hogan and Henry Sherman Boutell were named secretaries.

State senator Lorenzo D. Whiting made the first speech supporting Logan as the Republican candidate. State representatives Orrin P. Cooley and Charles E. Scharlau and state senators Martin B. Thompson and William S. Morris seconded the nomination. Other assemblymen joined in and Logan was easily nominated for his seat. Logan gave a speech, noting that Republicans held 102 of 204 seats against a coalition of other parties. This speech was followed by ones by former Governor of Illinois John Marshall Hamilton and district attorney James A. Connolly.

Illinois Democrats were relieved to hear that there were eight absences among the ranks of the Republicans at their nominating convention, although five expressed support for Logan within the day. Thomas C. MacMillan did not attend and did not explicitly support Logan, but stated that he would "in no event" vote for a Democrat. W. H. Ruger expressed hesitation towards Logan but admitted he would probably vote for him. Eugene A. Sittig did not attend the meeting and made no statement.

=== Democratic vote ===
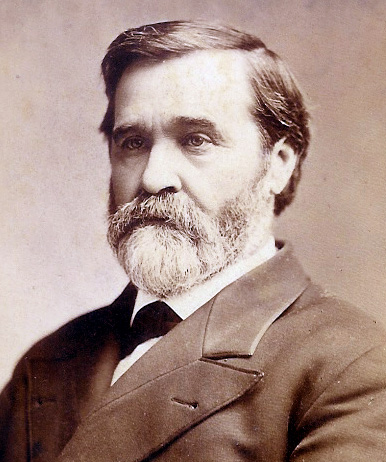
Initial Democratic candidate Colonel William Ralls Morrison

Without any nominating conventions, the Democratic party nominated their candidate during a legislative session on February 11. The deadline for officially naming a Democratic candidate was that day, though uncertainties prevailed about what time it was. Speaker of the Illinois House of Representatives Elijah M. Haines, nominally an independent, presided over the session. The motion to name a Democratic candidate was proposed by E. R. E. Kimbrough and was supported by fifty-six other Democrats. James M. Dill nominated William Ralls Morrison as the Democratic candidate. In protest, Republican members of the assembly left the hall. The remaining members of the house then cast a vote. Morrison received forty-four votes, Haines received one vote, and Haines voted for former representative Richard Bishop. Edward L. McDonald presented the resolution to the senate; most Democratic members of that body then entered the chamber. Henry Seiter was declared president pro tempore in the absence of any Republicans. Erastus N. Rinehart made the nominating speech on behalf of Morrison. A joint vote was then held in both houses. All senators and most of the representatives voted for Morrison, who was then officially nominated. Six Democratic representatives refused to vote and Haines again received one vote.

=== Stalemate ===
On February 13, a motion was held during a state senate session to proceed with the ballot, but it failed by one vote. Nonetheless, Whiting again spoke on behalf of Logan. The first ballot in the General Assembly was held on February 18. Logan received 101 votes, Morrison received 94, Haines received four, and three others received one vote apiece. Three ballots were held the next day, with Logan losing one vote to a third-party candidate. The assembly aimed to hold an election on February 26, but the sudden death of Republican representative R. E. Logan (no relation) prompted a stall in the vote. Republican Dwight S. Spafford replaced him, continuing the stalemate. A joint ballot was held on March 12 and each main candidate received 99 votes; four voters cast a vote for other candidates. Although Logan held a small lead in some of the ballots, the final ballot was 100 to 100 and the session adjourned. The Republicans held a vote on March 26. At first, Logan received 100 votes, but on a second ballot, Sittig supported Logan; MacMillan was the lone abstaining vote. Democratic senator Frank M. Bridges died in late March and was replaced with Democrat Robert H. Davis. Democrats began to explore other candidates, including General John C. Black and US Representative Richard W. Townshend.

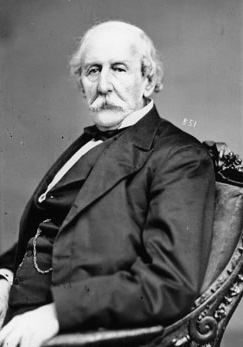
Late in the race, Democrats shifted their support to Judge Lambert Tree.

On April 12, Democrat R. H. Shaw, of the Democratic-leaning 34th district, died. Republican William H. Weaver won the election the next month against Arthur Allen Leeper by 246 votes. This finally gave the Republicans a majority in the joint session. Republicans in Springfield celebrated when the telegram confirming the victory arrived. Democrats blamed Morrison for the loss of the legislature seat. On May 14, a joint session was held. After three sessions of voting, Senator James W. Duncan announced that the Democrats wished to withdraw Morrison as a candidate. However, no replacement was immediately named. The fourth ballot saw a scattering of Democratic votes among fourteen candidates, though Morrison maintained a majority. The fifth ballot saw the emergence of Judge Lambert Tree with 35 of the 96 Democratic votes. Tree received 89 votes on the sixth and final ballot and was named the new candidate.

== Election ==
The session of May 19 saw an audience from around the state convene on Springfield to watch the joint legislative session. A roll call was first held in the senate. Senators had the right to vote at any time before the final reveal of the ballot, so no Democrat officially voted during the roll call. When the roll reached a key swing-vote in Ruger, Democrats were dismayed that he enthusiastically cast his vote for Logan. When the roll call moved on to the house, Democrats again kept silence as Republicans voted in turn for Logan. Another swing vote, MacMillan, supported Logan. The last hope for the Democrats was Sittig. When Sittig's name was called, he did not vote. This resulted in a round of applause from Democrats. However, after the roll call was finished, Sittig took the opportunity to speak. Sittig criticized Logan and the rest of the Republican caucus, but finally consented to vote for Logan. The assembly erupted in cheers for Logan, who finally had 103 votes.

With a Republican victory close at hand, Democrats no longer passed the opportunity to vote and started to cast votes for Tree. In a last-ditch effort, some Democrats threw their support behind Republican Charles B. Farwell, hoping to splinter the Republican vote. For the next hour, Democrats petitioned Speaker Haines to change their vote from Tree to Farwell. After Democratic senators cast their votes, Farwell only had the support of 96 Democrats and had not elicited support from any Republicans. With the results all but secure, Republicans agreed that a second roll call of Democrats should be held. Democratic senators cast their votes for Tree. Tree received most of the Democratic votes, with two votes going to Black, and one each to Morrison, to Chicagoan John R. Hoxie, and to Judge Charles J. Schofield. Haines held a last call, but no one changed their votes. Logan was elected to the US Senate with 103 votes to Tree's 96. Republicans cheered for the next ten minutes, then Logan gave an accepting speech and the meeting was adjourned.

State Legislature Results
Party	Candidate	Votes	%
Republican	John A. Logan (Inc.)	103	50.49
Democratic	Lambert Tree	96	47.06
Democratic	John C. Black	2	0.98
Democratic	John R. Hoxie	1	0.49
Democratic	William Ralls Morrison	1	0.49
Democratic	Charles J. Schofield	1	0.49
Totals		204	100.00%
