= Lambert Tree =

American judge, ambassador, and patron of the arts

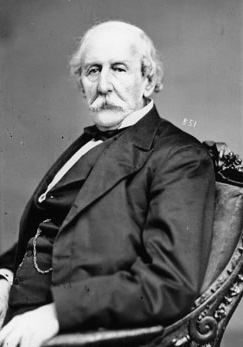

United States Ambassador to Russia
- In office 1888–1889
- President: Grover Cleveland
- Preceded by: George V. N. Lothrop
- Succeeded by: C. Allen Thorndike Rice

United States Ambassador to Belgium
- In office 1885–1888
- President: Grover Cleveland
- Preceded by: Nicholas Fish II
- Succeeded by: John Gibson Parkhurst

Personal details
- Born: November 29, 1832 Washington, D.C., U.S.
- Died: October 9, 1910 (aged 77) Manhattan, New York, U.S.
- Resting place: Graceland Cemetery
- Spouse: Anna Josephine Magie (m. 1859; died 1903)
- Relations: Ronald Tree (grandson); Ethel Field (daughter-in-law) Jeremy Tree (great-grandson) Michael Tree (great-grandson) Penelope Tree (great-granddaughter) Michael Blower (great-grandson)
- Children: James Mandeville Carlisle Tree; Arthur Magie Tree
- Education: University of Virginia
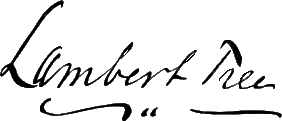
- Signature

Lambert Tree (November 29, 1832 – October 9, 1910) was a United States state court judge, ambassador, and patron of the arts.

== The Tree family of America and early life ==
The Tree family of America were amongst the first colonists from England to settle permanently on the shores of the continent, Richard Tree having arrived in Jamestown, Virginia in 1621, when the Colony of Virginia numbered between 500–1000 people. In May 1624, it is recorded that of the 7,300 colonists in total who had sailed from the first boats in 1606, 6,040 had died either at the Colony or in transit, meaning Richard was among a small group of surviving and able men in those first 18 years of English America, a good number of whom were gentlemen like he rather than skilled tradesmen. This would cause systemic problems in the early days and in subsequent decades efforts were made to settle skilled farmers and craftsmen. Richard Tree became a member of the Virginia Assembly in 1629 and 1632. The Tree family in America descended from a family that held land and estates near Beckington in Somerset for several hundred years with their family seat at Rudge, Somerset. Lambert appears to have been a common given first name in both the English and American sides of the family, which is sound evidence that Richard Tree and his US descendants are in all likelihood a branch of the Rudge and Beckington 'Trees' who were among the landed gentry of Somerset.

The Virginia Trees remained in the Colony where they thrived over several generations and were active in the political life of the community. Captain Lambert Tree, a prominent ship-owner in the Atlantic sea-trade between 1762 and 1776, became an early battlefield commander in the Revolutionary War against the British under George Washington and died in the first year of the War. His son, Captain John Tree, was also a sea-captain and based out of Philadelphia: this Tree is the grandfather of Lambert Tree.

Two hundred years and more after Richard's arrival in America, Lambert was born at the family home in Washington, D.C., on November 29, 1832. He was the second, but eldest surviving, son born to Lambert Tree (1799–1881) and Laura Matilda Burrows, a granddaughter of Maj-Gen John Burrows, who also fought in the Revolutionary War under George Washington. His father had moved from Philadelphia to Washington where he lived for over 60 years and worked for the U.S. Postal Service. Lambert Tree went to the University of Virginia, where he studied law and graduated LLB and was admitted to the Washington bar in 1855.

== Career ==
Soon after his admission to the bar in Washington, he moved west to pursue his career as the West opened up and moved to the then small frontier town of Chicago, Illinois. He practiced law and.

In 1871, Tree was elected to succeed W. K. McAllister on the Circuit Court of Cook County. He was re-elected in 1879 and 1885, and left office in July 1875. Tree presided over the indictment, trial, and conviction of corrupt City Council members.

Tre lost the 1882 United States Senate race by one vote, then fell seven votes shy in 1885. However, later in 1885, he accepted an appointment from President Grover Cleveland as minister to Belgium. He then served the shortest tour, less than one month, of all U.S. Ministers to Russia: after his presentation of credentials on January 4, 1889, he left post on February 2, 1889, not long before the inauguration of President Cleveland's successor, Benjamin Harrison, a Republican. President Harrison nominated Judge Tree to sit on the International Monetary Conference in Washington in 1891-2 and he was one of those for whom ballots were cast for nomination to the Vice-Presidency of the United States, in the Democratic National Convention in 1892.

He was very active in the civic and cultural life of the City as Life Trustee of the Newberry Library, Vice-President of the Chicago historical Society, incorporator of the American Red Cross and founder of the Chicago Branch. He was for several years President of the Illinois Historical Society and was honoured as Officer of the Legion of Honour by France, Grand Officer of the Order of Leopold by Belgium and was a member of the Sons of the American Revolution.

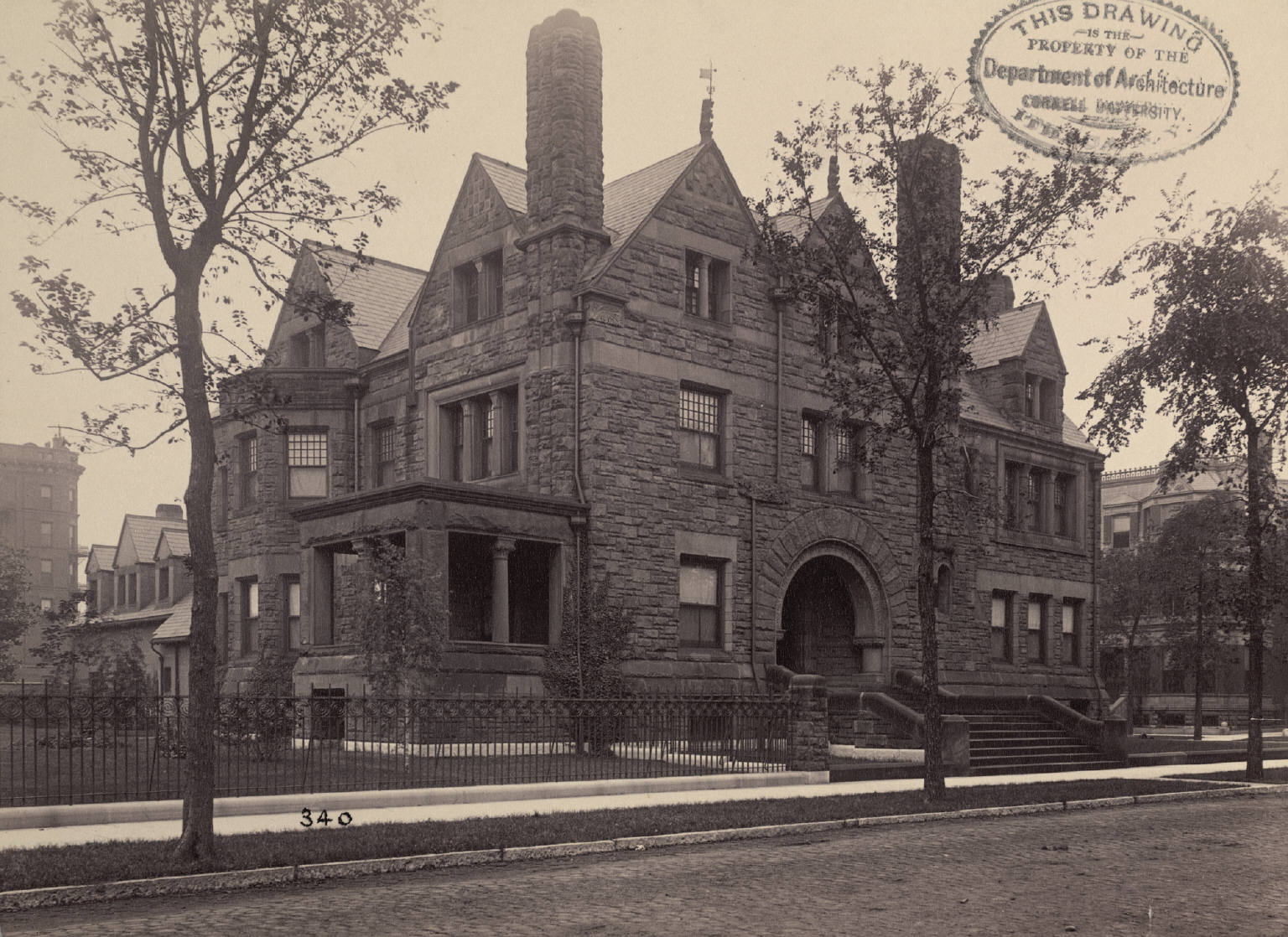
Tree's Chicago residence, designed by Peabody & Stearns

== Personal life ==
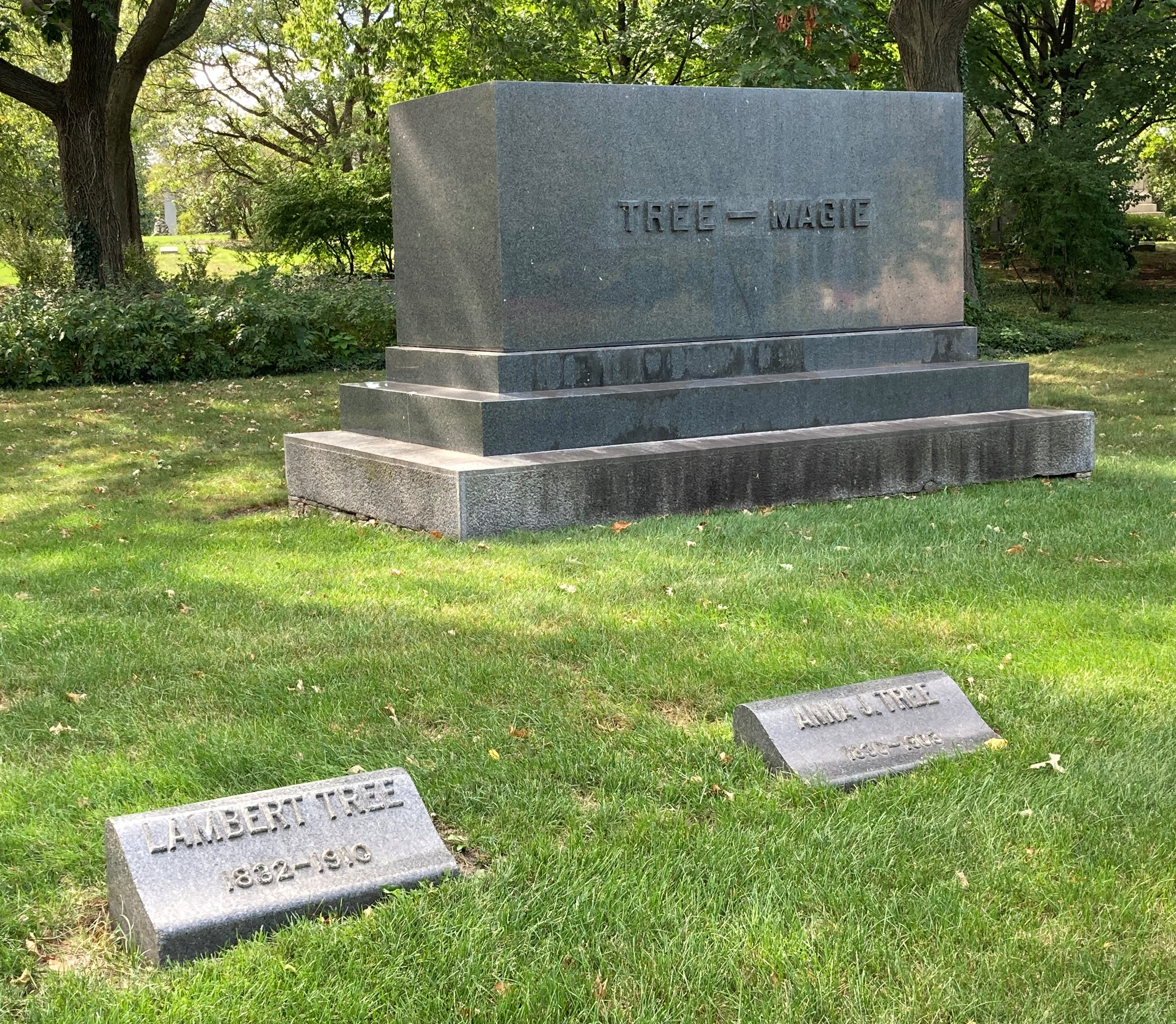
Graves of Lambert and Anna Josephine Tree at Graceland Cemetery

Tree was married to Anna Josephine Magie in 1859; she was the daughter of Haines H. Magie (b. 1804), who was one of the very earliest settlers in Chicago and owned land and a business in the heart of the City. In 1834, Magie's groceries and dry goods store was one of only 350 businesses in the Chicago directory and in 1837, he had acquired 80 acres of land in the then small settlement for $1.25/acre. In 1872, he built a store and offices development at 70 West Hubbard Street, designed by the architects Bauer & Loebnitz, making the Magie building one of the grandest of buildings in the rapidly growing city centre and which he partially gifted along with other landholdings to his son-in-law. The Trees would go on to build their city centre mansion on Magie land around what is now Ohio, State and Ontario Streets along Wabash Avenue. The house was built first and later, where the stables had been, Tree built his eponymous Studios. Lambert and Anna were the parents of an older son who died in infancy and one surviving child, Arthur Magie Tree.

- James Mandeville Carlisle Tree (b. 1861), who was born in Paris.
- Arthur Magie Tree (b. 1863), who married Ethel Field, the daughter of American millionaire Marshall Field in a lavish ceremony at the Field's mansion on Prairie Avenue.

While travelling back from a European trip on a steamboat in early October 1903, his wife died. Seven years later, on 9 October 1910, Tree died in the Waldorf Astoria New York from heart failure. When Tree died he had been returning from visiting his son at his home on his country estate in England; Tree had never been happy that Arthur decided to live abroad and demonstrated his displeasure with the situation by stipulating in his will that his grandson, Ronald Tree, should receive his education in America.

He was buried at Graceland Cemetery in Chicago.

=== Arthur Magie Tree ===
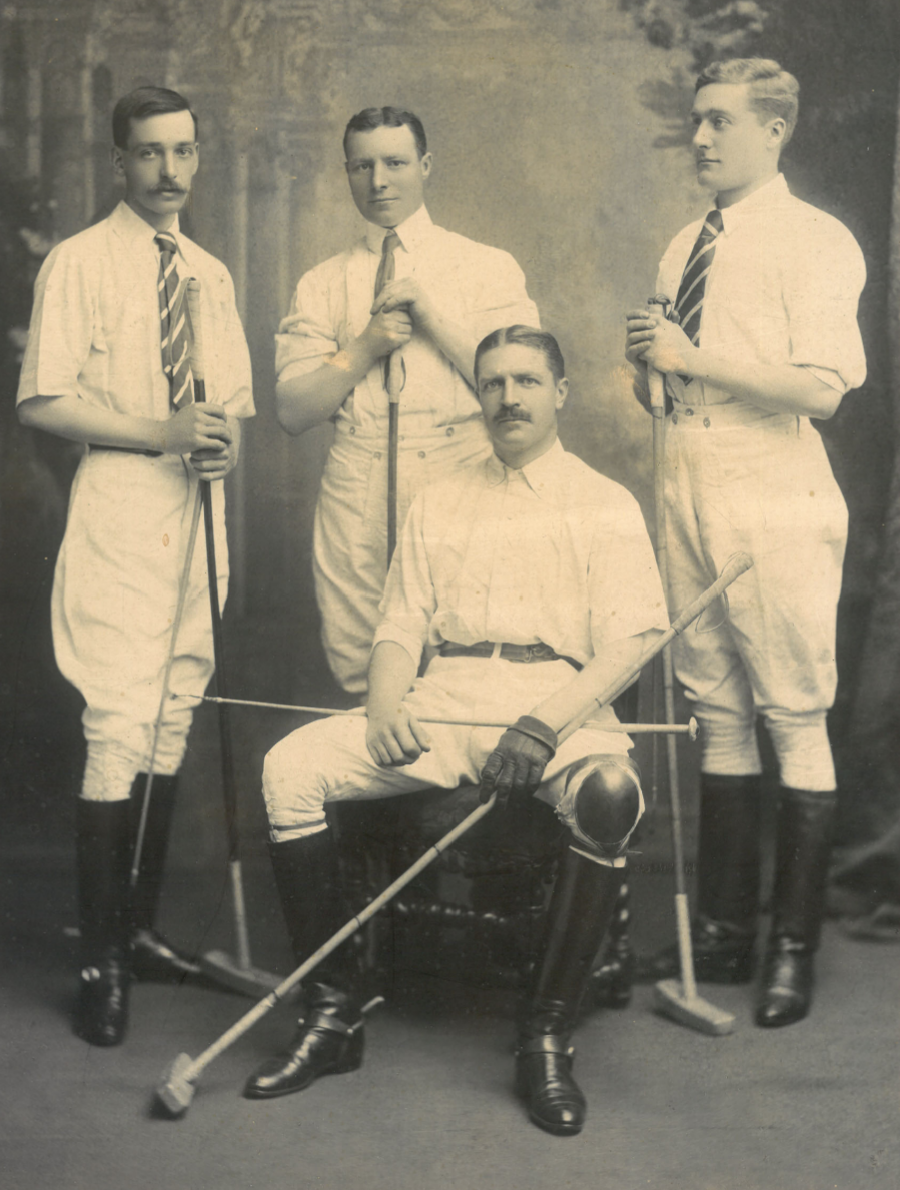
Arthur Tree (seated) with polo team, probably taken during his time at Princeton in circa 1885

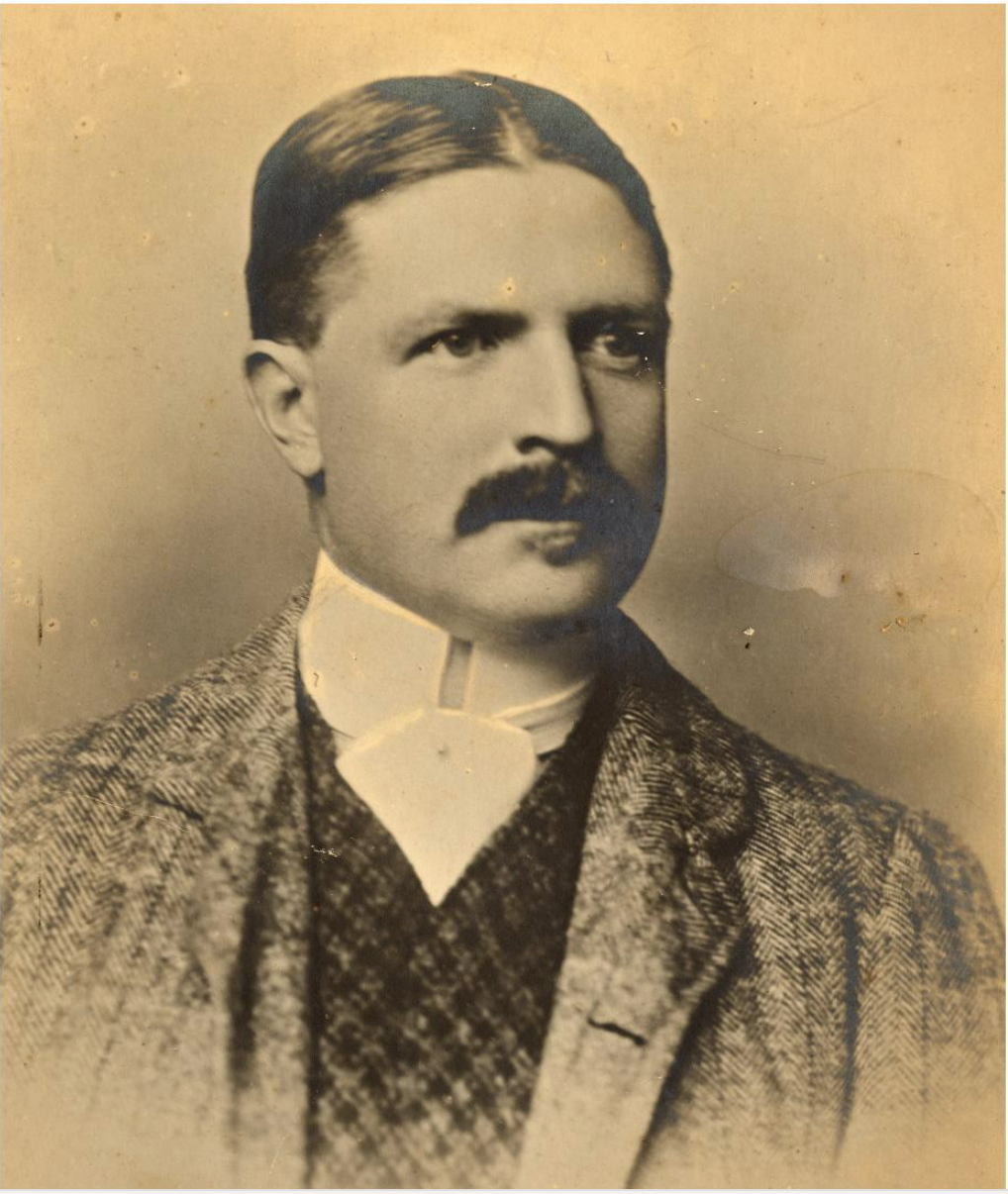
Arthur Magie Tree as a young man circa 1895

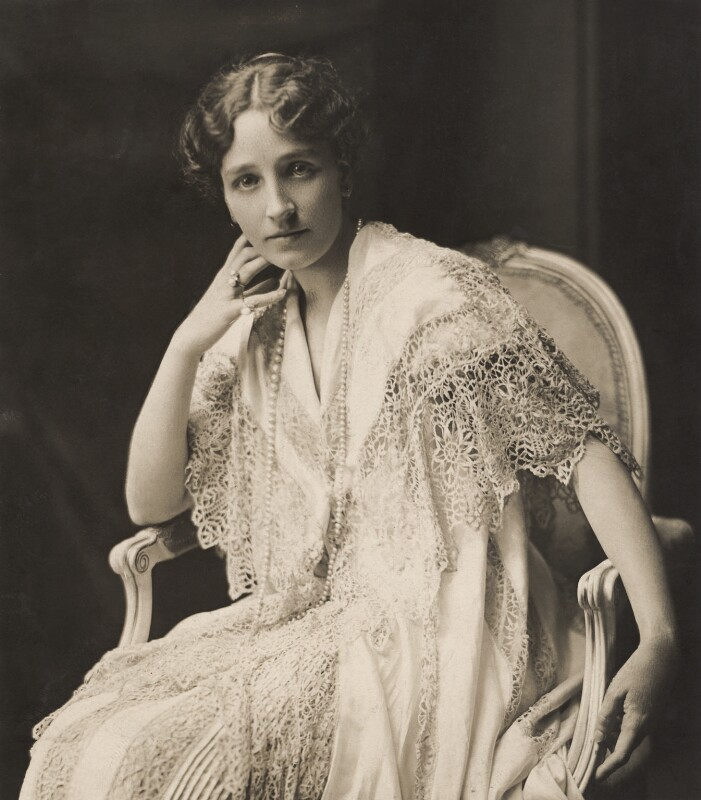
Ethel (nee Field) Beatty, portrait 1915

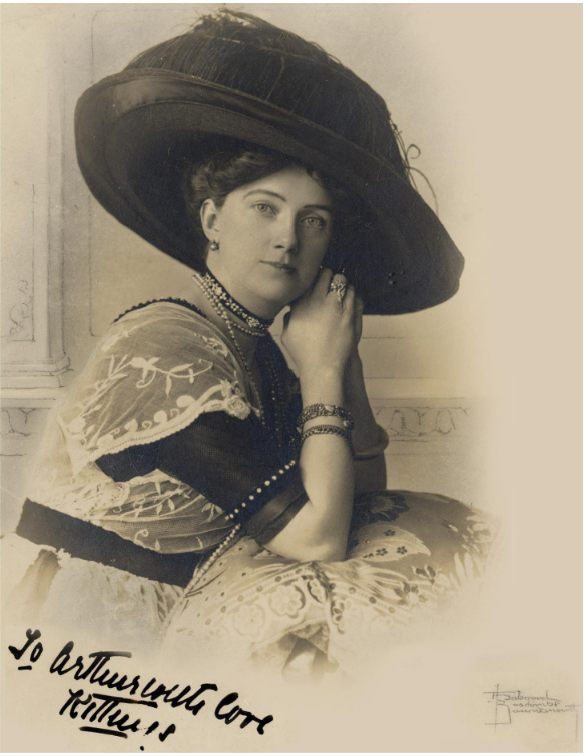
Kathleen "Kitty" (Walsh) Waring, mother of six children to Arthur Magie Tree and governess to Ronald Tree

Lambert's son and heir, Arthur, was born on the 1st July 1863 in Chicago and died on the 27th September 1914 in Southampton, England, where he had been living near Leamington in Warwickshire at a grand country house, Ashorne Hill House, built with his wife Ethel. The building is a finely executed house of the late-Victorian period, finished in sandstone and survives in an institutional use, though the Tree connection is affirmed by the family crest over the main entrance porch and Arthur's initials (AMT) over the stable yard portico. He attended Princeton University, graduating Class of 1885, having read history and law, like his father. He self identified as a horse breeder and farmer, though he was a gentleman of some leisure by all accounts and possessed an ocean going motor yacht of grand proportions. The marriage with Ethel did not have a good start as both their first born children died in infancy; Lambert and Gladys. Finally a surviving son was born, Ronald, on September 26, 1897. By this time, the marriage can't have been a happy one and was over soon after Ronald's birth. Upon dissolution of the marriage, Ronald remained with his father at Ashorne Hill. Apart from the son with his wife Ethel, he also had children with the Irish-born governess of his young son at Ashorne Hill, Kathleen "Kitty" (Walsh) Waring. They had two daughters and four sons in the period between circa 1898 and 1914, two of whom were born prior to the divorce being granted in 1901, a son in 1898 and a daughter in 1901. As the only son of two of Chicago's wealthiest families, Arthur was already privileged, but his marriage brought even greater wealth and in spite of his later divorce, Arthur and his children continued to enjoy a life of great luxury, not least with Arthur's ocean going motor and sailing yacht The Adventuress.

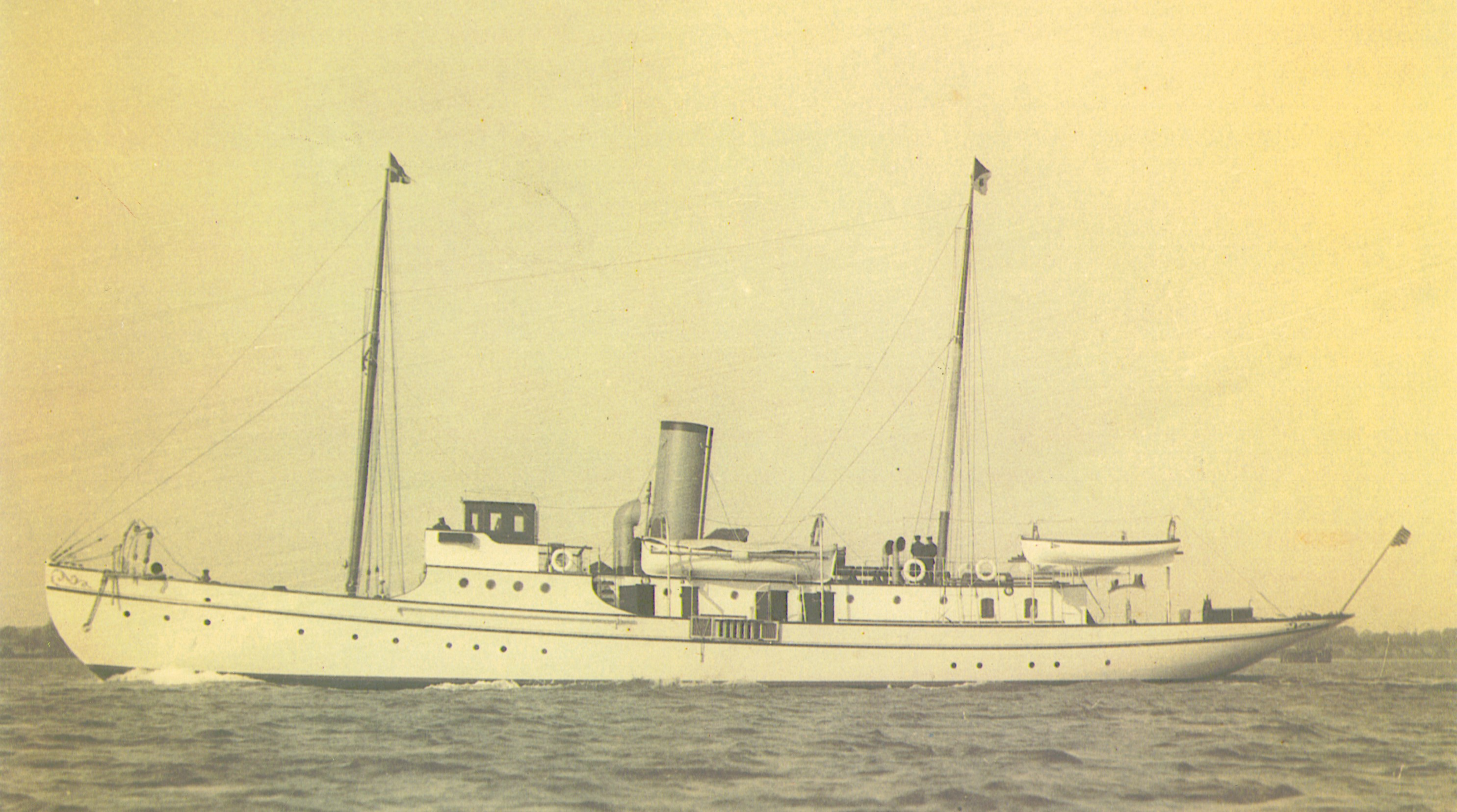
Arthur Tree's yacht, The Adventuress, built in South Shields

The family, that is all the Trees (Lambert, Josephine, Arthur and Ronald) were reputed to hold the record for the greatest number of transatlantic voyages up until the 1920s by any single family - 122 in total. Josephine in fact died on a liner during passage between Southampton and new York in 1903 and Lambert spent a good part of his final years in England with his son and grandchildren.

== Legacy ==
A patron of the arts, Judge Tree and his wife had an artists studio constructed in 1894 at 603-621 N. State St., to provide low cost housing and space for artists. The Tree Studio Building is important architecturally for its picturesque details of the period. After its original construction, two wings (located on Ohio and Ontario) were added during 1912–1913, forming a distinctive courtyard. This U-shaped complex is now closed off at the other end by the Medinah Temple. Tree Studios is one of the nation's oldest such studios, the original portion being designated a Chicago landmark February 26, 1997. Lambert Tree Avenue in Highland Park, Illinois, was named after him. In Lincoln Park, Lambert Tree gifted the statue of René-Robert Cavelier, Sieur de La Salle, a bronze statue by the Belgian sculptor, Count Jacques de Lalaing (artist) and erected in October 1889. Tree was also responsible for the gift to the city of A Signal of Peace, an equestrian bronze by Cyrus Edwin Dallin which he had created for the 1893 World's Columbian Exposition and also erected in the Park along the lakeshore.

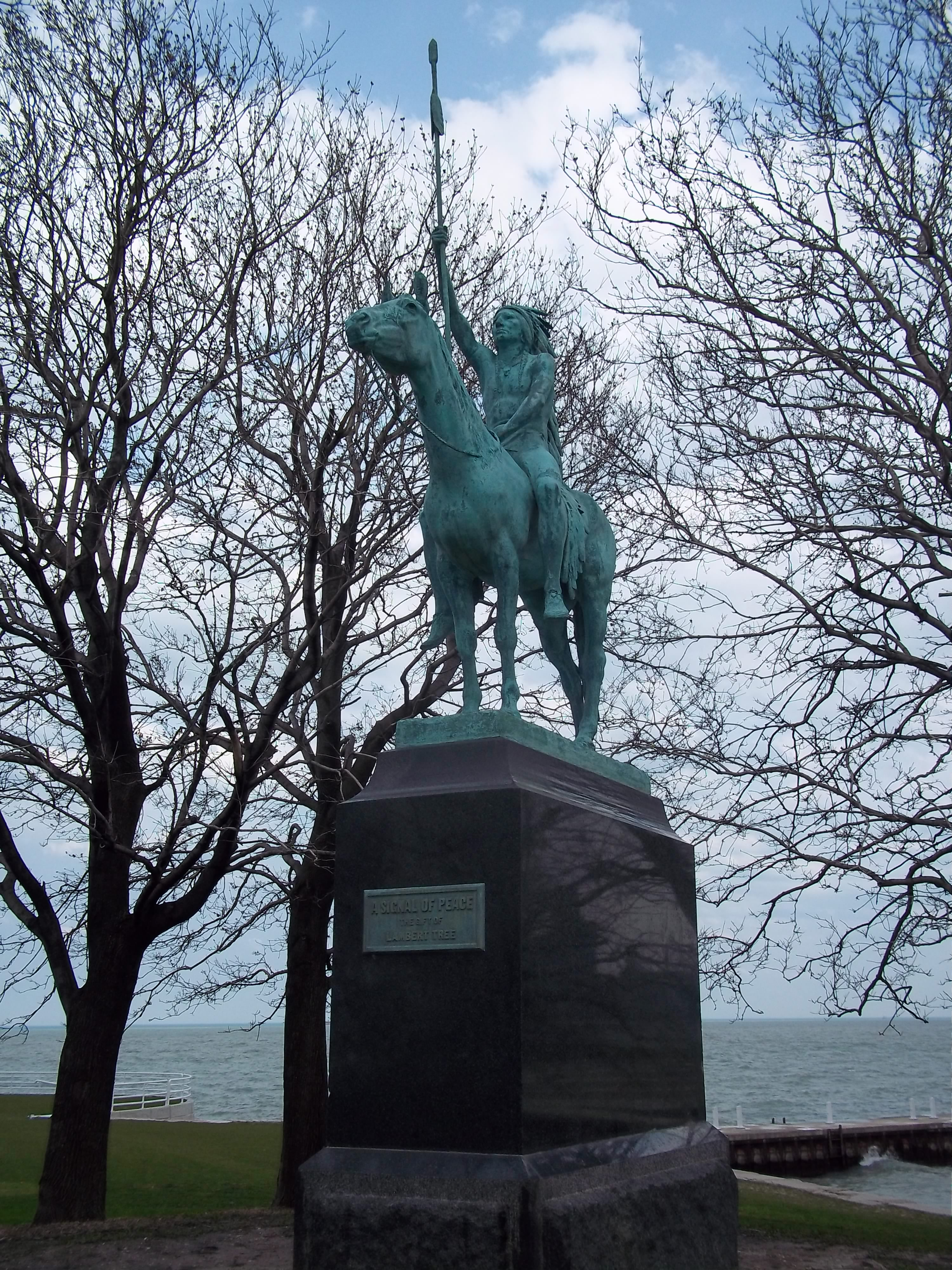
Indian Peace

== Houses of Lambert Family ==
Three generations of Trees were prominent owners and connoisseurs of fine houses, both commissioning, restoring and owning some of the finest houses on both sides of the Atlantic. Lambert Tree built his own family house at 94 Cass Street, (now Wabash but since demolished) to a design by the eminent Henry Hobson Richardson, one of the greatest of American architects in the latter half of the 19th C. Lambert also commissioned the Tree Studio Building and Annexes, a surviving example of the work of Parfitt Brothers architects and now on the U.S. National Register of Historic Places. In England, Arthur commissioned the Grade II Listed Ashorne Hill House by the architect Edward Goldie in the style of a grand country house, with a touch of the arts & crafts, but also with a late-Victorian eclectic flourish. Arthur also lived for a time at his now Grade II* London house in 7E Collingham Gardens designed by the significant Victorian architects of Sir Ernest George and Peto. Following his father and grandfather, Ronald was the owner at various times of two of England's finest historic country houses, Ditchley Park and Kelmarsh Hall. It was at Ditchley where Winston Churchill would sometimes repair during the darkest days of war. With a foot in England and one across the Atlantic, it is not surprising that he enjoyed the warmer climes and relaxed colonial ambience of Barbados - not least escaping post-War austerity - where he founded and built the Sandy Lane resort and hotel towards the end of his life. On the island, he worked closely with Sir Geoffrey Jellicoe on his own island home Heron Bay, built just after the closure of War and one of the finest neo-Palladian mansions of the New World. In New York, Ronald also lived for a time at the Ogden Codman House, a grand town house on the Upper East Side.

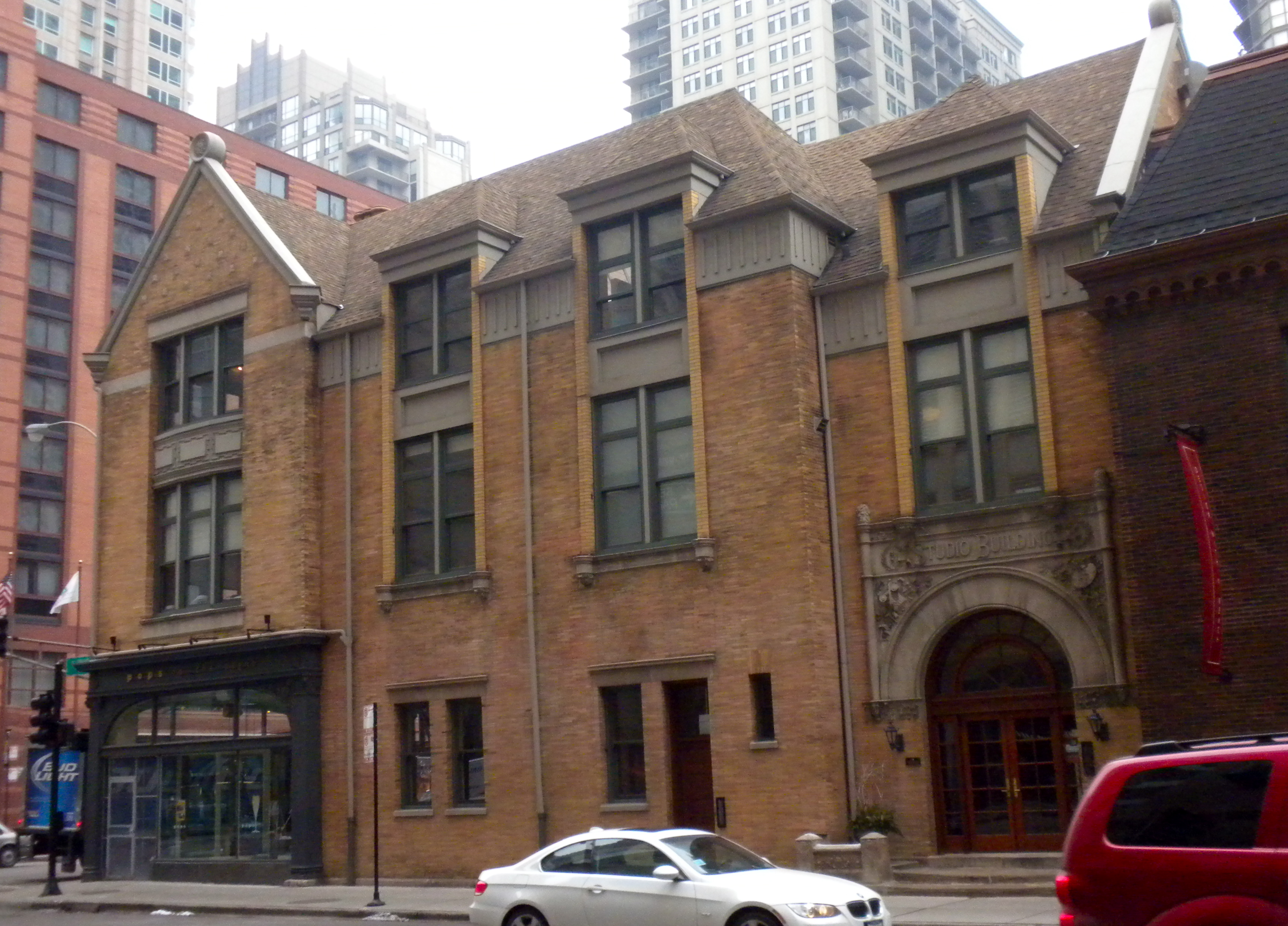
Studio BLG Chicago

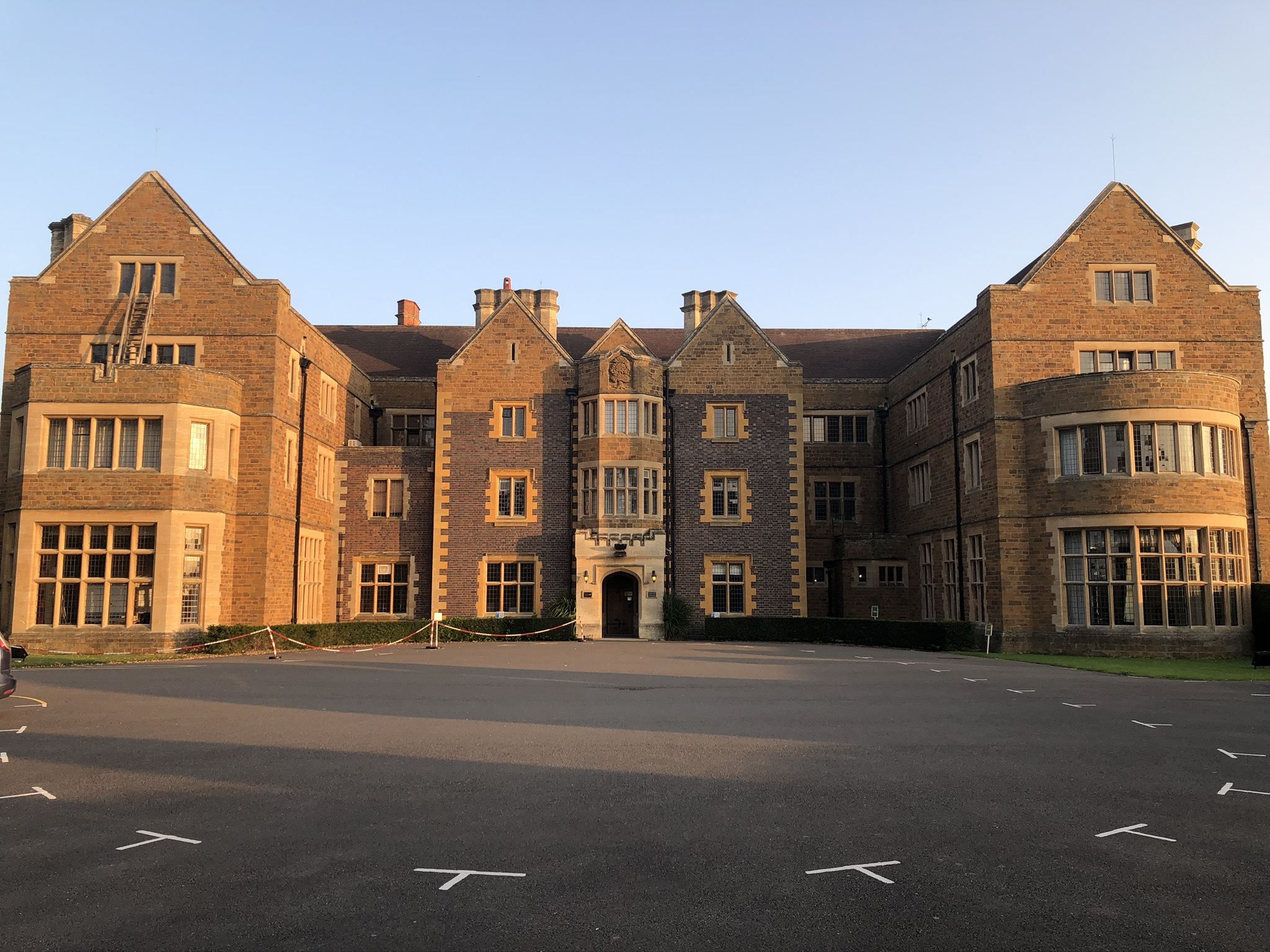
Ashorne HIll House, Ashorne, Warwickshire, North Front

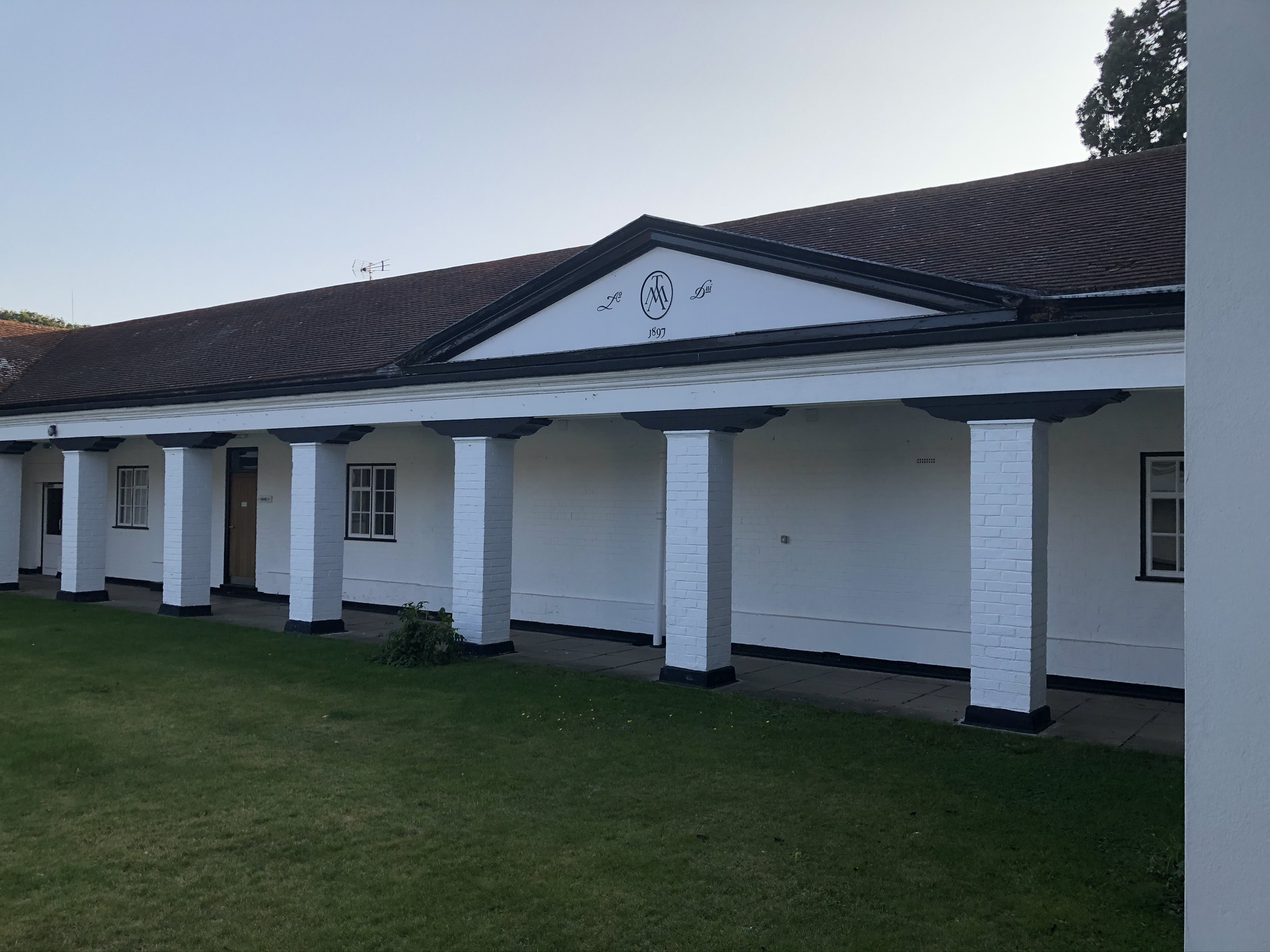
Stable courtyard at Ashorne Hill House, Warwickshire

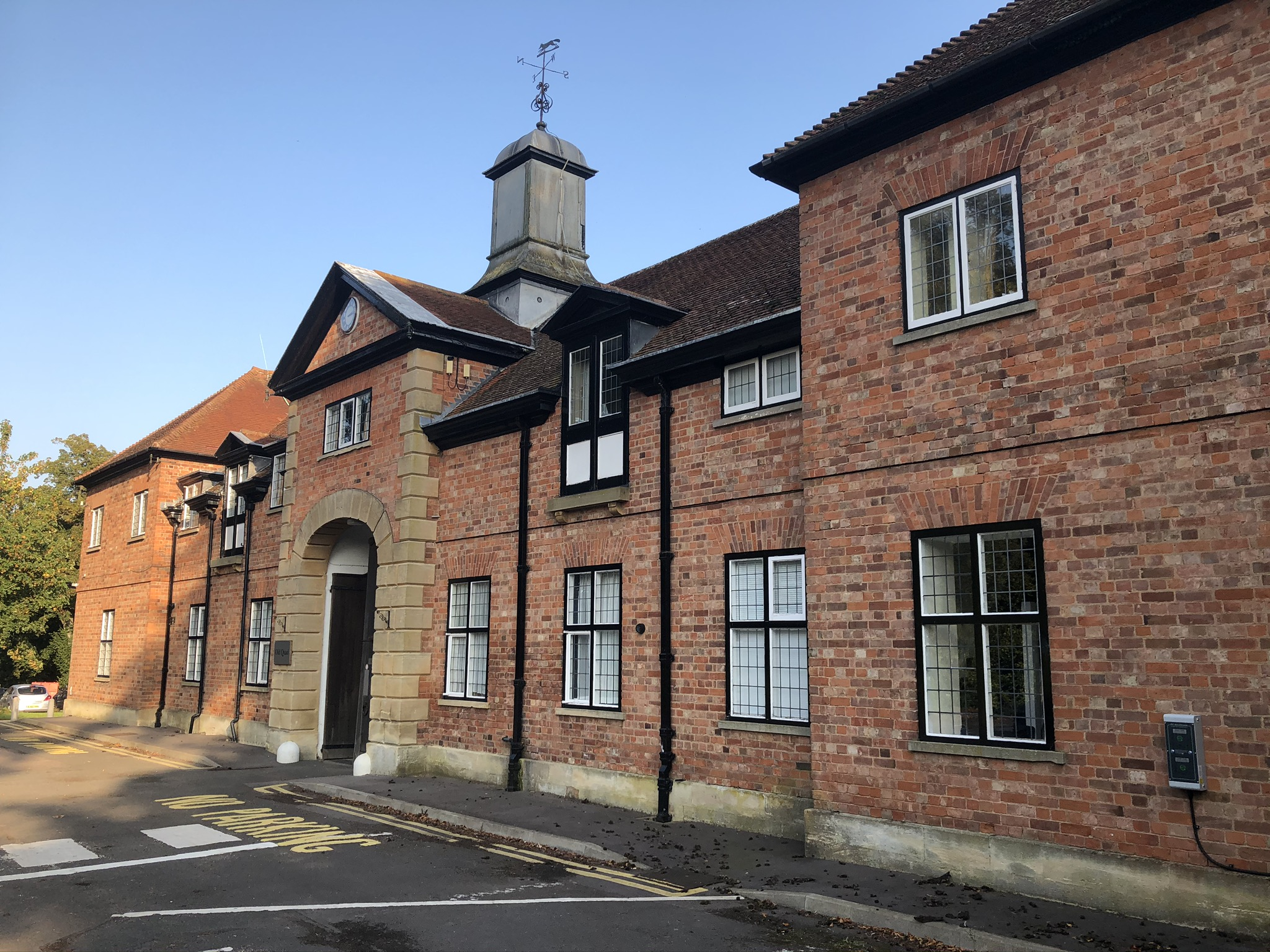
Stables at Ashorne Hill House, Ashorne, Warwickshire

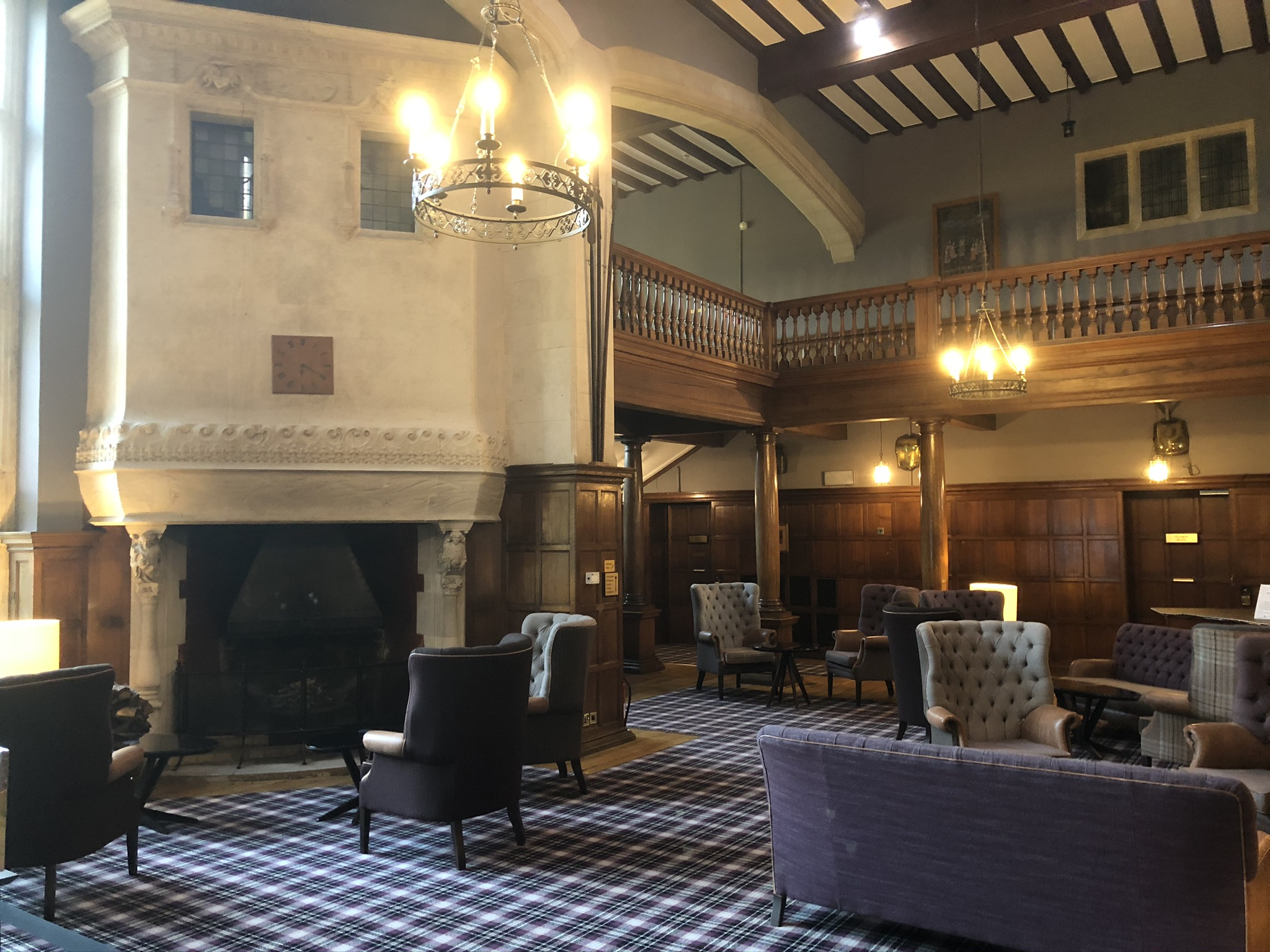
Ashorne Hill House, Ashorne, Warwickshire - The Great Hall

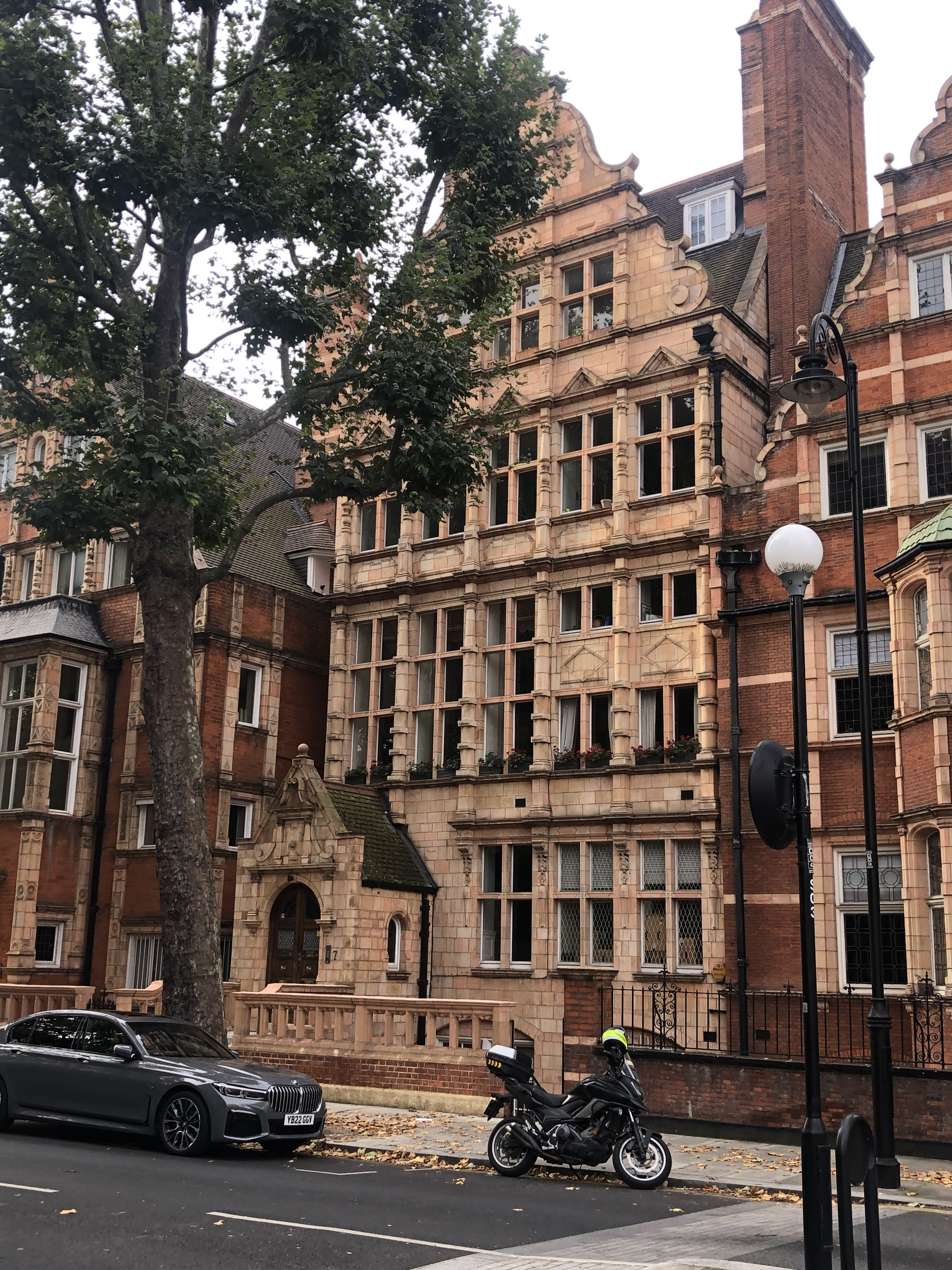
Image of street frontage (1–8 Collingham Gardens are all Grade II* listed, and were designed by Ernest George in 1881–84)

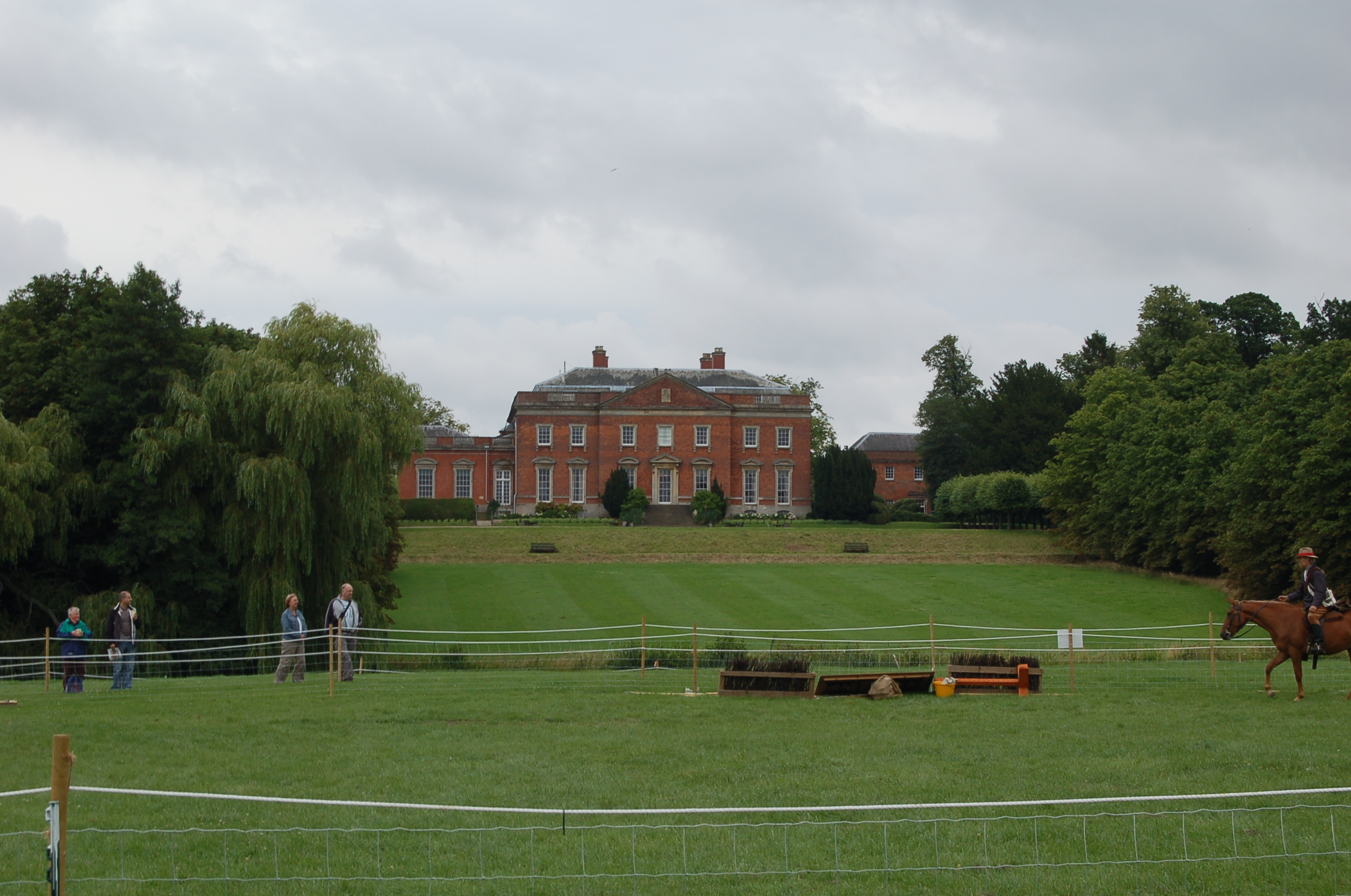
Kelmarsh Hall

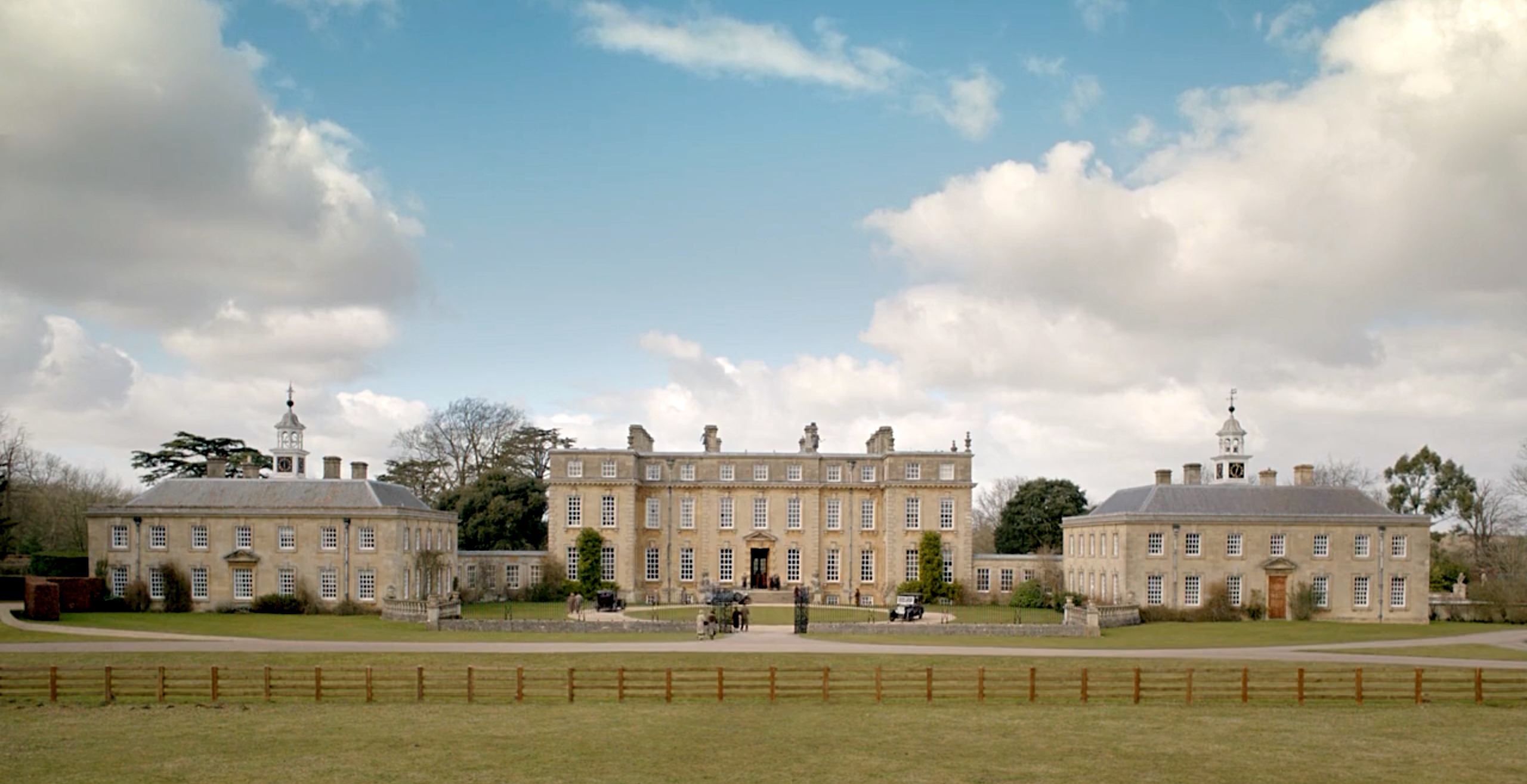
Ditchley

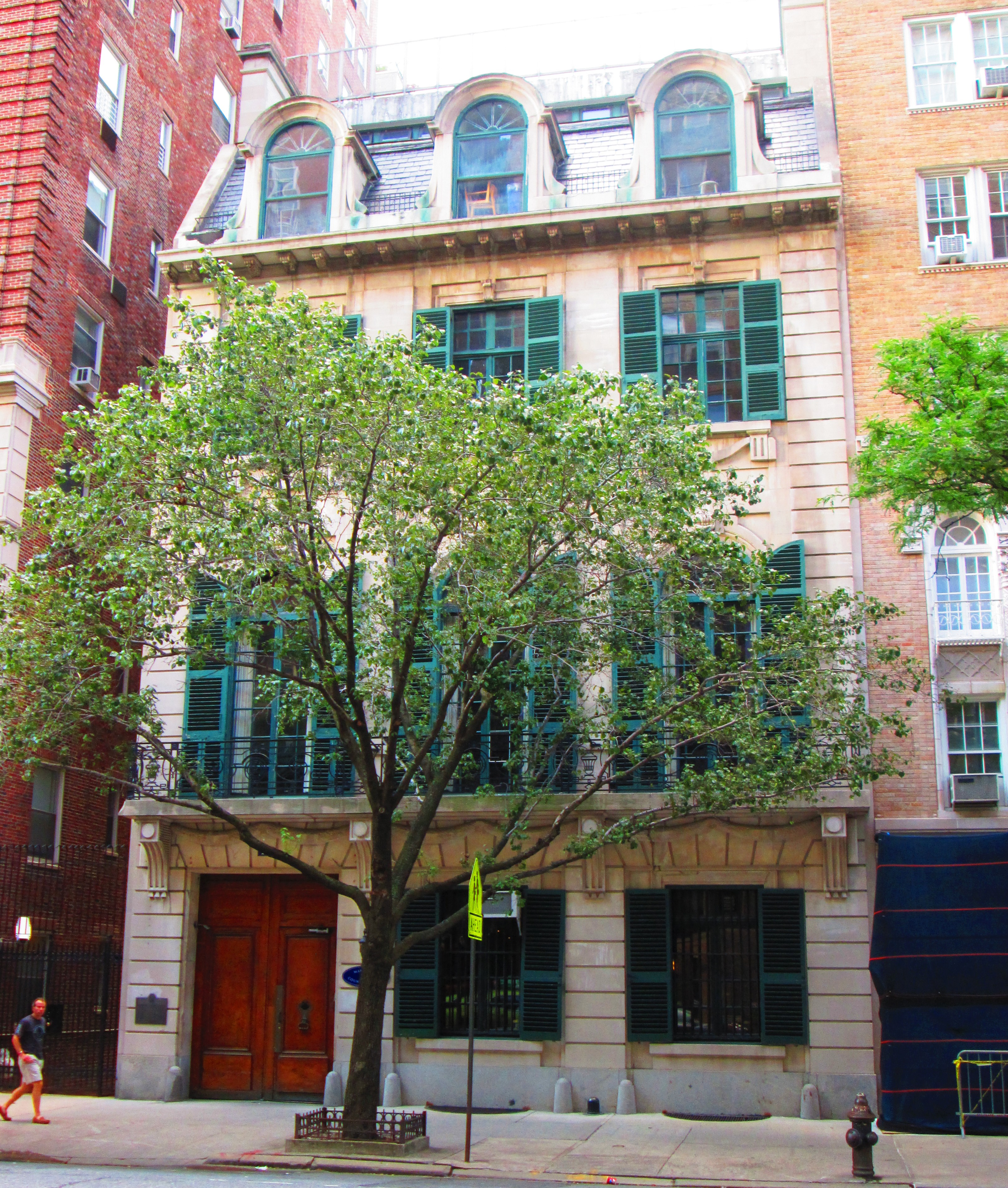
Ogden Codman Jr. House 7 East 96th Street from east

=== Lambert Tree Award ===
In 1887, Judge Lambert Tree and Chicago Mayor Carter H. Harrison put up the funding for civilian awards given annually to an individual member of the Police and Fire Departments who demonstrate outstanding bravery in the line of duty. Currently, the medal presentations are rotated from year to year, so neither award is perceived as better than the other. The awards are given out during Fire Prevention Week in October each year for the preceding twelve months. In 1999, the Fire Department designee received the Lambert Tree Award, thus in October, 2000, the department recipient will receive the Carter H. Harrison Award. These awards have been presented annually (with the exception of the years 1890–1896) since March 4, 1887. A listing of police award recipients by year, with a little description can be found online.

== See also ==
- A Signal of Peace, 1890 statue by Cyrus Edwin Dallin which Tree purchased and donated, exhibited in Lincoln Park, Chicago
- The Tree Family, written and researched by Josiah Glanville Leach LLB, published JB Lippincott Company, Philadelphia, 1908.

Diplomatic posts
Preceded by Nicholas Fish II	United States Minister to Belgium; 1885–1888	Succeeded by John G. Parkhurst
Preceded by George V. N. Lothrop	United States Minister to Russia; September 25, 1888 – February 2, 1889	Succeeded by Allen Thorndike Rice
