= Ashorne =

Village in Warwickshire, England

Coordinates: 52.21°N 01.55°W

- Location within Warwickshire
- Population: 267 (2011)
- OS grid reference: SP304577
- Civil parish: Newbold Pacey
- District: Stratford-on-Avon
- Shire county: Warwickshire
- Region: West Midlands
- Country: England
- Sovereign state: United Kingdom
- Post town: Warwick
- Postcode district: CV35
- Dialling code: 01926
- Police: Warwickshire
- Fire: Warwickshire
- Ambulance: West Midlands

Ashorne is a village in Warwickshire, West Midlands, England and part of the parish of Newbold Pacey. Ashorne is 7 miles (11 km) from Stratford-upon-Avon and 4.5 miles (7 km) from Warwick. Ashorne Hill House is a large country house which is used as a conference centre.

== Cricket team ==
Ashorne has a cricket side running sides on a Saturday, Sunday and Midweek. The club joins local village Moreton Morrell in being known as Ashorne and Moreton Morrell CC. 'The Horne' as they can also be known play league cricket in the Cotswold Hills Cricket league. Ashorne cricket Club is the only club in England to have to cross a water source, which is called the Thelshold Brook, to get to the clubhouse. It is also the only club in 3 different Villages. The Pitch is in Ashorne, The Clubhouse is in Newbold Pacey and all of the players come from Moreton Morrell.
