= Thomas C. MacMillan (politician) =

American politician

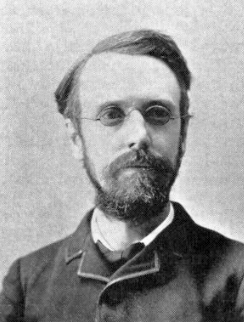

Member of the Illinois Senate from the 4th district
- In office 1888 – 1892
- Preceded by: Thomas A. Cantwell
- Succeeded by: Moses Solomon

Personal details
- Born: October 4, 1850 Stranraer, Wigtownshire, Scotland
- Died: December 13, 1935 (aged 85) La Grange, Illinois, US
- Party: Republican
- Profession: Newspaper reporter

Thomas C. MacMillan (October 4, 1850 – December 13, 1935) was a Scottish American politician, Congregationalist, and newspaper reporter from Wigtownshire, Scotland. MacMillan attended schools in Chicago, Illinois, then began a long career as a reporter for the Chicago Inter Ocean. He served eight years in the Illinois General Assembly and was active in church affairs.

== Biography ==
Thomas C. MacMillan was born in Stranraer, Wigtownshire, Scotland, on October 4, 1850. MacMillan was a relative of US Senator James McMillan and was the first cousin, once removed, of Hugh Macmillan, Baron Macmillan. He came with his parents James H. and Susan (Cumming) to the United States in 1857. He attended public schools in Chicago, Illinois, and took a course at the University of Chicago. For the next twenty-four years, from 1873 to 1895, MacMillan reported for the Chicago Inter Ocean.

MacMillan was elected to the Illinois House of Representatives as a Republican in 1884. He was a key swing vote in the 1885 Senate election of John A. Logan. MacMillan was re-elected to another two-year term in 1886. He was then elected to the Illinois Senate, where he served a four-year term through 1892. He was part of the committee that wrote the Chicago Sanitary District Act of 1889 and advocated for its passage. MacMillan was also a member of the senate committee on the World's Columbian Exposition, which authorized a $80,000 grant for the fair. In 1895, MacMillan was elected clerk of the United States District Court for the Northern District of Illinois.

MacMillan was active in the Congregational church and served as moderator of the Illinois State Congregational Association in 1899. From 1900 to 1901, he was president of the Chicago Congregational Club. In 1906, he was named president of the Illinois St. Andrew's Society, holding the office until 1908. He was first vice president of the 3rd International Congregational Council in 1908 and moderated the National Council of Congregational Churches of the United States from 1907 to 1910.

On January 24, 1883, MacMillan married Marcy C. Goudie. They had two sons and a daughter. MacMillan was a member of the Cook County Board of Education from 1879 to 1882. He then directed the Chicago Public Library until 1887. In 1897, he served on the board of managers of the Illinois State Reformatory, then served four terms as president of the La Grange School Board. He received a Master of Arts degree from Illinois College in 1885 and a Legum Doctor from Knox College in 1911. In his free time, he enjoyed writing, walking, and studying history.

He died at his home in La Grange on December 13, 1935, and was buried at Na-Au-Say Cemetery in Yorkville.
