= Ashorne Hill House =

Grade II listed house in Warwickshire, United Kingdom

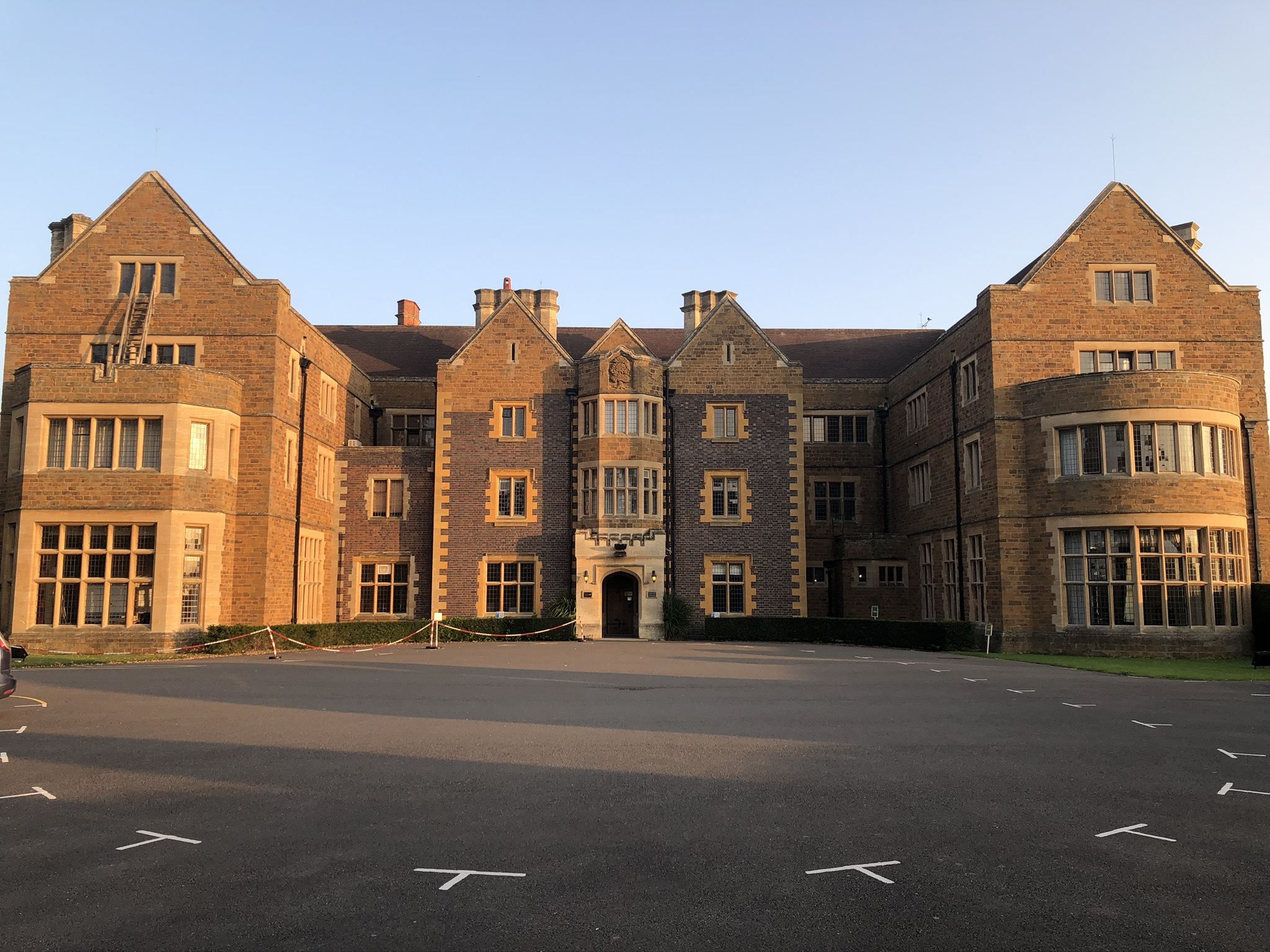

- Location within Warwickshire
- 52°13′27″N 1°33′00″W
- Type: House
- Location: Ashorne, Warwickshire

History
- Built: 1895–1897

Site notes
- Architect: Edward Goldie
- Architectural style: Arts and Crafts
- Governing body: Privately owned

Listed Building – Grade II
- Official name: Ashorne Hill Management College
- Designated: 25 November 1994
- Reference no.: 1381964

Listed Building – Grade II
- Official name: Terrace Balustrade South West of Ashorne Hill Management College
- Designated: 19 August 1999
- Reference no.: 1381965

Ashorne Hill House, Ashorne, Warwickshire, England is a late Victorian country house built for Arthur and Ethel Tree by the architect Edward Goldie between 1895 and 1897. Arthur Tree, son of the American lawyer and diplomat, Lambert Tree, and his wife, the Marshall Field's heiress, had moved to England in the later 19th century and established themselves as country gentry. They purchased the Ashorne estate in 1892 and Goldie was commissioned to build a new house in the Arts & Crafts style. The house, now a management training college, is a Grade II listed building.

== History ==
Arthur and Ethel Tree formed part of a group of Americans who emigrated to England in the late 19th century. Fiske Kimball, an architect and director of the Philadelphia Museum of Art described "the traditional country house of England [as] the perfection of human society", and a number of wealthy Americans determined to buy or build their own perfections in England. The group's foremost member, William Waldorf Astor had declared that America was "no longer a fit place for a gentleman to live" and had moved himself, his family, and his $100M fortune to England in 1891. Astor set himself up as a country gentleman at Hever Castle in Kent, and the Trees followed his example at Ashorne Hill. They employed Edward Goldie to design the house which was constructed between 1895 and 1897. Their marriage did not long outlast their purchase of the estate – Ethel's affair with David Beatty led to their separation in 1899 and divorce in 1901. Arthur remained with their children at Ashorne, and established a second family with their governess, Kathleen Walch, with whom he remained in an unmarried partnership until his death in 1914. One of Arthur and Ethel's children was Ronald Tree, who married Nancy Lancaster, the interior designer. (Note: Ronald and Nancy Tree restored a number of major English houses, including Kelmarsh Hall and Ditchley Park.)

The house was later owned by the Bryant family, of Bryant & May matchmakers, before being sold in the 1930s to the British Iron & Steel Corporation for use as their corporate headquarters. During the Second World War over 600 technical staff worked in secret at the house on metallurgic investigations to support Britain's war effort. They were housed in Tree's stables, which were constructed in 1897 and bear his initials in a datestone on the interior courtyard wall. At this time Ashorne, described as “the Bletchley Park of the steel industry”, was managed by Major John Howard Alexander, the inventor of the spear-point pump, used in the Sinai and Palestine campaign. (Note: Earlier in his career, Major Alexander had served in Natal during the Bambatha Rebellion of 1906. In 2002, a trunk belonging to him was discovered in the attics at Ashorne Hill. It contained relics from the rebellion, including a lock of the hair of Bhambatha kaMacinza, the leader of the revolt.) The house is now a management training college.

== Architecture and description ==
Nikolaus Pevsner, in his Buildings of England volume, Warwickshire, described Ashorne as "clearly on the way to the Lutyens style", while Chris Pickford, in the revised 2016 edition, sees comparisons with "contemporary American mansions on Long Island and in the Hudson Valley". Historic England describes the style as "a good example of late 19th century Arts and Crafts architecture". Edward Goldie was primarily an ecclesiastical architect and Ashorne Hill is a rare example of his extending his practice into domestic architecture. The layout of the house follows a neo-Elizabethan E-plan, with a recessed entrance porch and two projecting wings. The interior is decorated in a medley of opulent styles; Pickford and Pevsner record the “Neo-Jacobean galleried hall, classical drawing room and Rococo boudoir“. Historic England notes that the large overmantel above the fireplace in the great hall was originally decorated with plaster reliefs of a "tree, figures, portrait busts etc." but these have now been eradicated.

Ashorne Hill is a Grade II listed building. The balustrade on the terrace that runs along the south, garden, frontage of the house, and which dates from 1901, has its own Grade II listing.

== Gallery ==
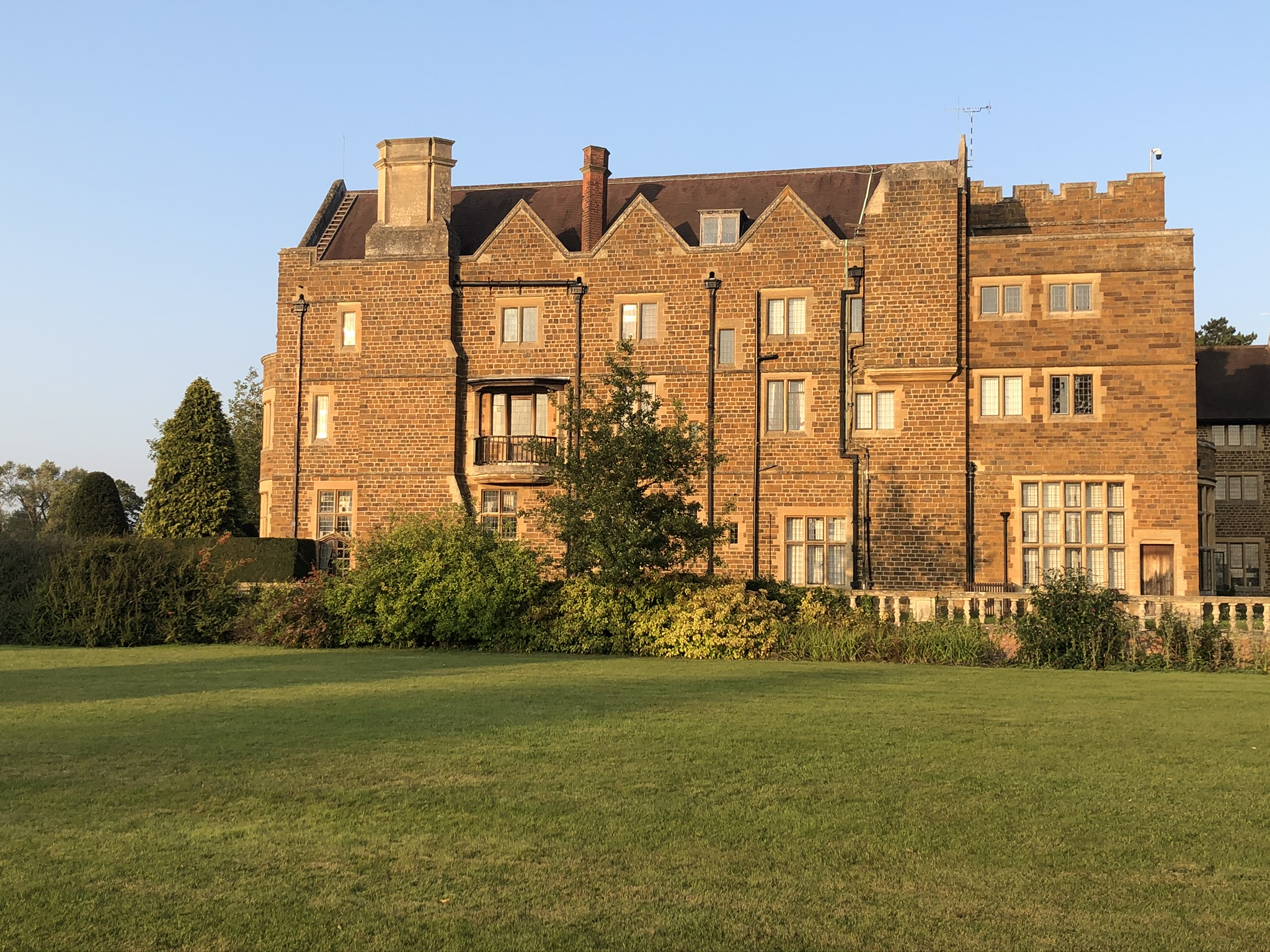
The South front

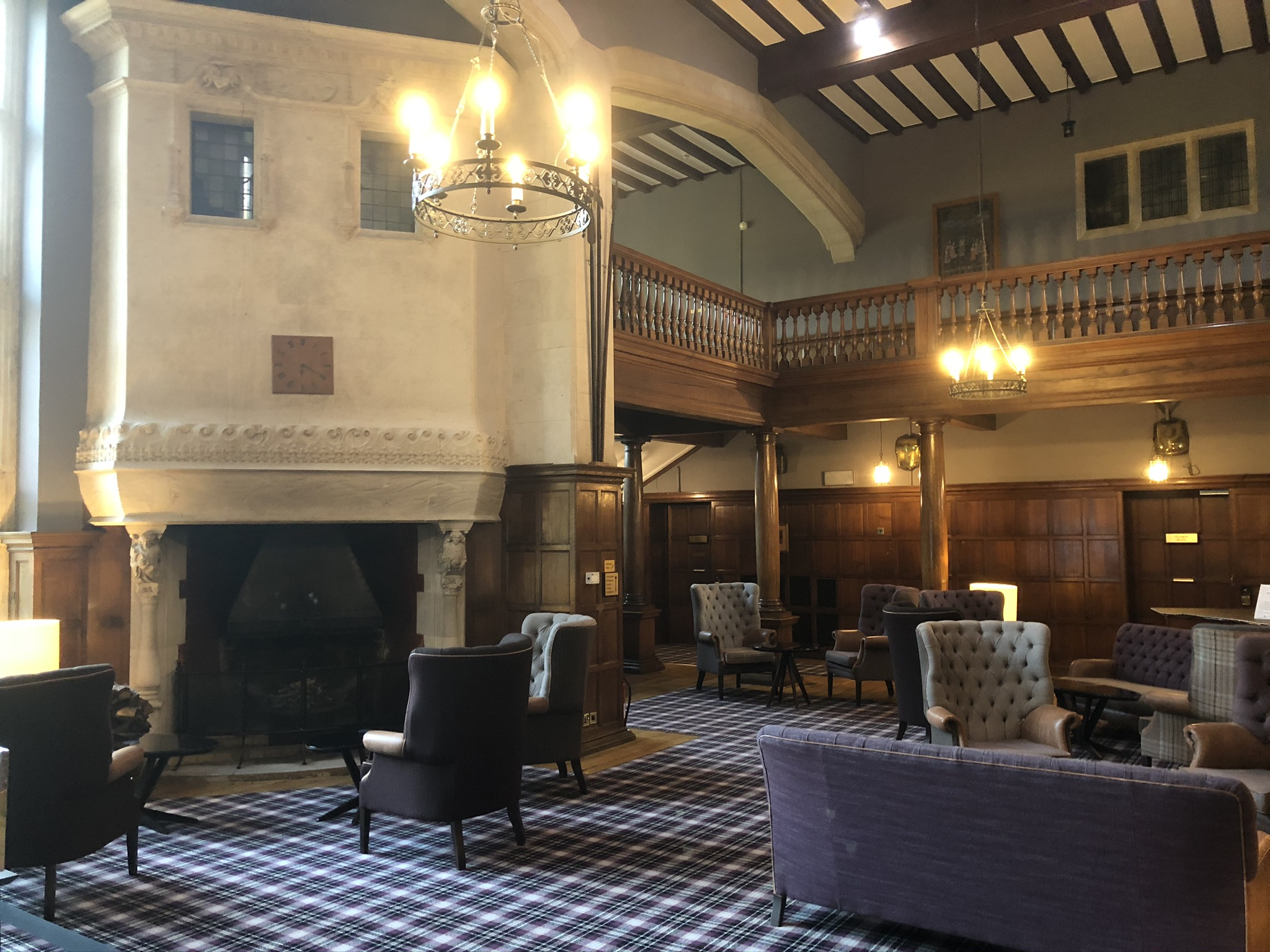
The Great hall with inglenook

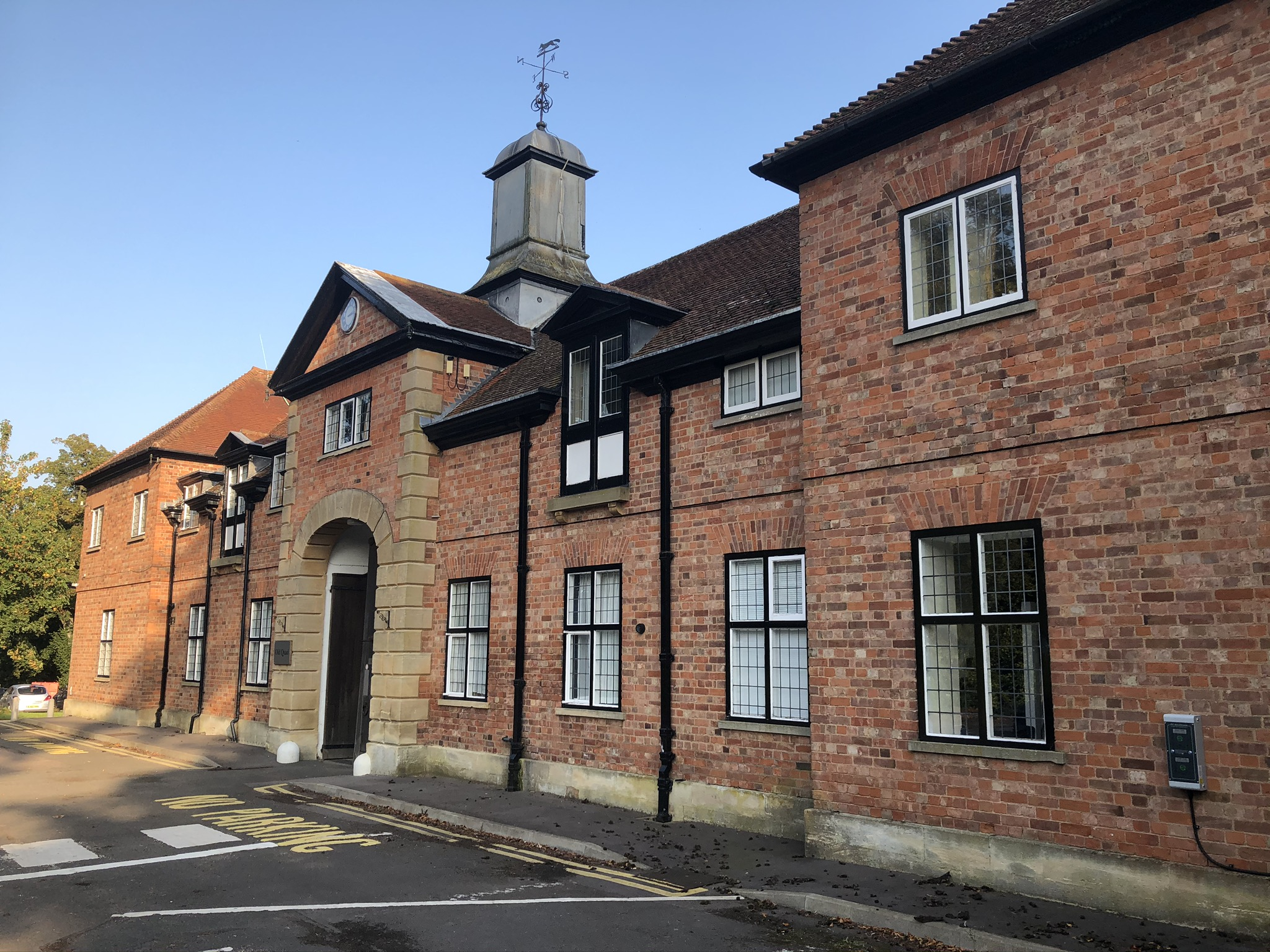
The stables

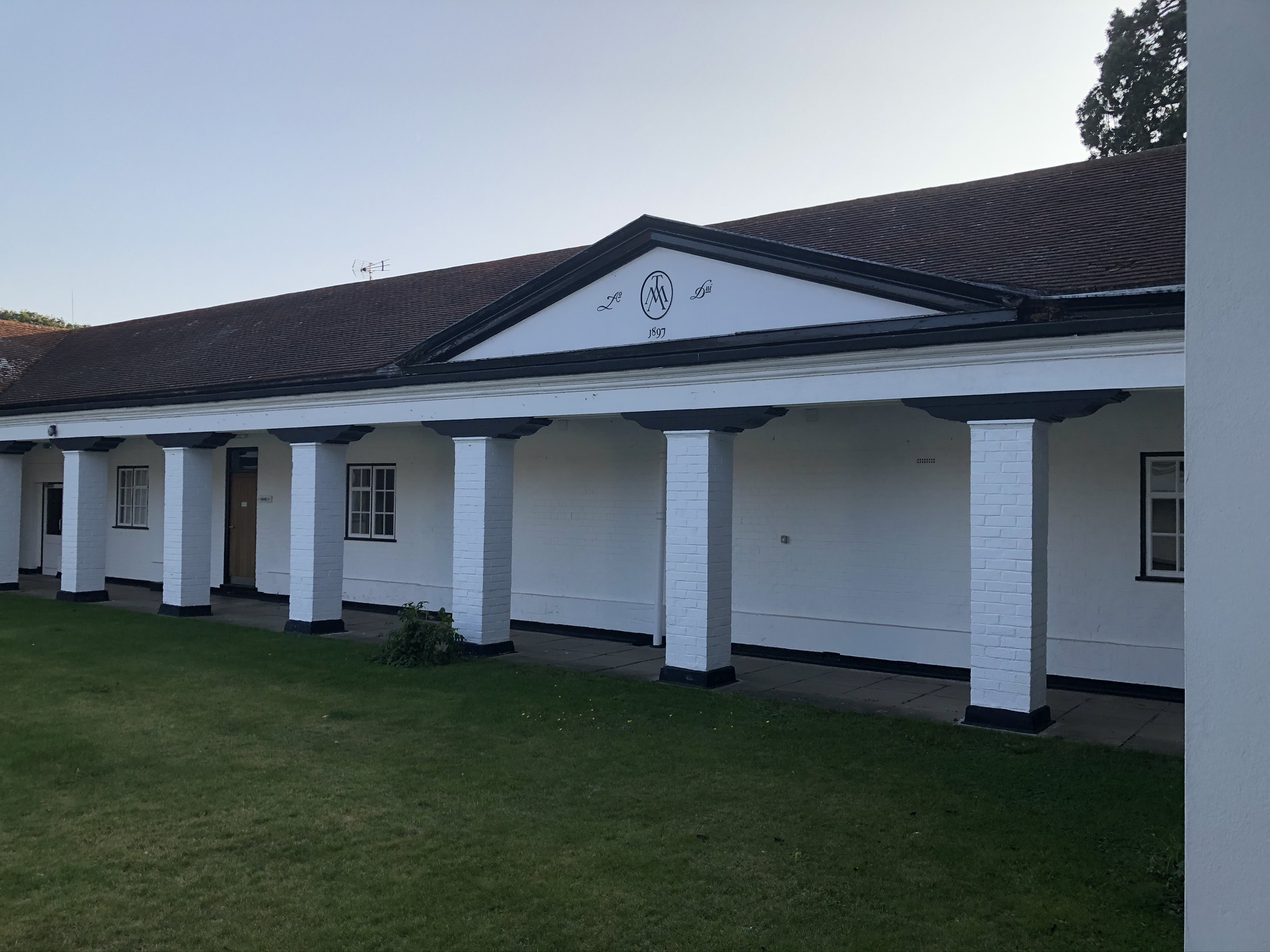
The stable courtyard with Arthur Magie Tree's initials on the entablature

== Sources ==
- Aslet, Clive (2013). An Exuberant Catalogue of Dreams. London: Aurum Press. ISBN 9781781310946. OCLC 840477309.
- Hutto, Richard Jay (2006). Their Gilded Cage: The Jekyll Island Club Members. Macon, US: Indigo Custom Publishing. ISBN 978-0-977-09122-5.
- Pickford, Chris; Pevsner, Nikolaus (2016). Warwickshire. The Buildings Of England. New Haven, US and London: Yale University Press. ISBN 978-0-300-21560-1. OCLC 987591594.
