= Eugene A. Sittig =

American politician

Eugene Alexander Sittig

Member of the Illinois House of Representatives from the 6th district
- In office 1876 – 1878
- In office 1884 – 1886

Personal details
- Born: October 1, 1847 Lauban, Prussia
- Died: June 6, 1907 (aged 59)
- Party: Republican
- Profession: Publisher

Eugene Alexander Sittig (October 1, 1847 – June 6, 1907) was a German American publisher and politician from Prussia. Immigrating with his family as an infant, Sittig apprenticed as a blacksmith in Chicago, Illinois. He later joined the advertising department of a German language paper. Sittig spent most of his career editing papers directed at Chicago's German audiences. He was twice elected to the Illinois House of Representatives

== Biography ==
Eugene Alexander Sittig was born in Lauban, Prussia on October 1, 1847. His parents immigrated to the United States with him when he was an infant. They first settled in Kenosha, Wisconsin, then moved to Dubuque, Iowa. Sittig attended public school, then apprenticed as a blacksmith in Chicago, Illinois. He returned to Dubuque at age 19 upon the death of his father to settle family affairs. He then returned to Chicago to work in the shoe business. Finding little success, he took a new job in the advertising department of the Chicagoer Volkszeitung, a paper owned by his former blacksmith mentor F. A. Jensch.

Sittig had several successful years at the company before leaving to co-publish the weekly The Business Guide. He then worked with a series of German-centric publications, including the Freie Presse, the Handels-Zeitung, German American Miller, and Deutsche Industrie. Later in his life he edited the Brewer and Maltster, a brewing trade journal. In 1876, Sittig was elected to the Illinois House of Representatives as a Republican, serving a two-year term. In 1884, he was again elected to the house for another two-year term. During this second term, Sittig gained notoriety as the vote that broke a 102–102 stalemate in the house concerning the re-election of John A. Logan as a U.S. Senator.

While in Dubuque tending to his family, Sittig married. They had two children: Jenny and William A., the latter of which frequently worked under his father. His wife died in 1898 and Sittig married Anna Weidner. Sittig was a Freemason and was a member of the Germania Club and Chicago Press Club. Sittig died on June 6, 1907, from complications of pneumonia. He was buried in Rosehill Cemetery in Chicago.
