= Lighthorne =

Village in Warwickshire, England

Coordinates: 52.200°N 1.505°W

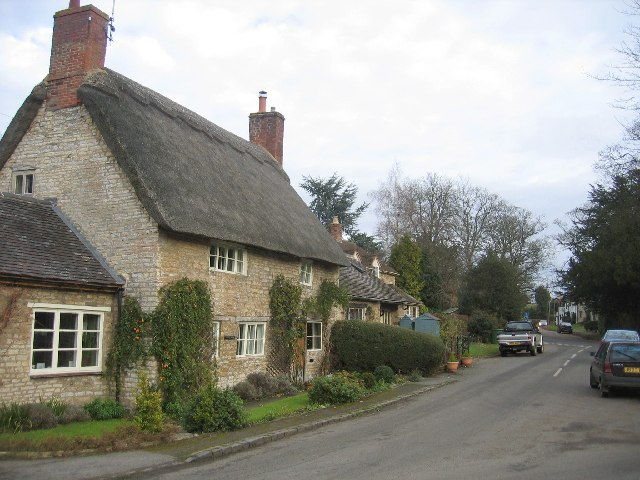

- Location within Warwickshire
- Population: 432 (2021)
- OS grid reference: SP 339 558
- Civil parish: Lighthorne
- District: Stratford-on-Avon
- Shire county: Warwickshire
- Region: West Midlands
- Country: England
- Sovereign state: United Kingdom
- Post town: Warwick
- Postcode district: CV35
- Dialling code: 01926
- Police: Warwickshire
- Fire: Warwickshire
- Ambulance: West Midlands
- UK Parliament: Kenilworth and Southam

Lighthorne is a village and civil parish in Warwickshire, England. It is about 6 miles (9.7 km) south of Leamington Spa. The population taken at the 2011 census was 361, rising to 432 in the 2021 census. Lighthorne is a small village in a valley and is near Moreton Morrell, Kineton and Wellesbourne. The first mention of a post office in the village is in October 1849, when a type of postmark known as an undated circle was issued. The parish church of St. Lawrence stands in a valley west of the village. It is built of stone in the late-13th century style but the west tower was rebuilt in 1771 and the remainder of the church in 1875–6. Between 2011 and 2018, with revisions made in 2023, annotations from graves in the church's graveyard were recorded by the village's History Society. In October 2008, Lighthorne Parish council bought the telephone box in the village (which had been used only twice in three years) from the BT Group.

In 2026, The Antelope, a Grade II listed pub in the village centre, closed after becoming 'no longer financially viable'.
