= Daniel Hogan (Illinois politician) =

American politician

Member of the Illinois Senate from the 51st district
- In office 1882 – 1890
- Preceded by: Andrew J. Kuykendall
- Succeeded by: P. T. Chapman

Personal details
- Born: July 4, 1849 Kilkenny, Ireland
- Died: 1912 Danville, Illinois
- Party: Republican
- Profession: Telegrapher

Daniel Hogan (1849–1912) was an Irish American politician and telegrapher. Coming from Ireland to Pulaski County, Illinois with his parents at a young age, Hogan studied telegraphy in his youth. These skills were valuable during the Civil War and Hogan traveled with Ulysses S. Grant to several major battles. After a stint working for Western Union, Hogan returned to Illinois to be with his parents and was named to the Illinois Senate. He served four two-year terms.

== Biography ==
Daniel Hogan was born in Kilkenny, Ireland on July 4, 1849. His parents immigrated with him to the United States in 1852 and settled in Pulaski County, Illinois. There, Hogan attended public schools and helped on the family farm. Later, he attended Cairo High School and independently studied telegraphy.

Hogan was too young to enlist in the Union Army when the Civil War broke out, but his elder brother snuck him into the 31st Illinois Volunteer Infantry Regiment, a unit under the command of John A. Logan. His telegraphy skills were noticed and he was sent to serve under Ulysses S. Grant's brigade with the telegraph corps. He was awarded the rank of lieutenant and was later promoted to captain. He was at many of Grant's major battles, including Fort Henry, Fort Donelson, Corinth, Nashville, and Iuka.

He was mustered out at the close of the war, whereupon he attended the business school at Bryant & Stratton College. After graduation, he worked for Western Union in several cities. He returned to Mound City, Illinois in 1869 to attend to his aging parents. In 1873, Hogan was elected Pulaski County Clerk, holding the office for nine years. Hogan purchased the Pulaski Patriot in 1880. In 1882, Hogan was elected as a Republican to the Illinois Senate. He was re-elected in each election through 1890, serving four two-year terms. In 1889, he was named collector of internal revenue. He died in Danville in 1912.
