= Charles E. Scharlau =

American politician

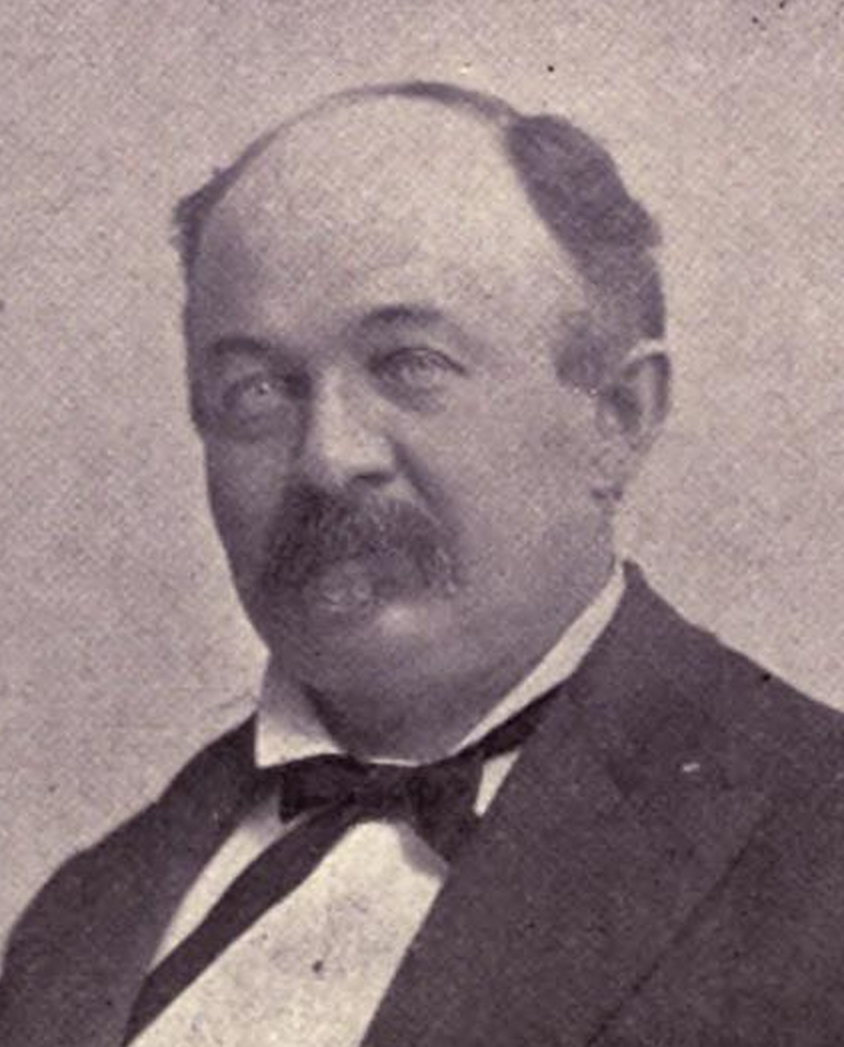

Member of the Illinois House of Representatives from the 9th district
- In office 1884 – 1888

Personal details
- Born: May 23, 1845 Alt Tellin, Pomerania
- Died: March 23, 1903 (aged 57) Chicago, Illinois
- Party: Republican
- Profession: Soldier, politician

Charles E. Scharlau (May 23, 1845 – March 23, 1903) was an American soldier and political leader in the State of Illinois. He was born in Pomerania where his parents were farmers. In 1851 his family immigrated to the United States in search of a better life, and settled in Chicago. At age 17 Charles enlisted in the Union Army in the Fifty-seventh Illinois Volunteers, and later served under Major-General John A. Logan. After discharge Charles entered politics and served two terms in the Illinois House of Representatives where his efforts were instrumental in bringing about the successful election of John A. Logan as U.S. Senator representing Illinois. Charles' candidacy for the Illinois Legislature in 1880 led to the celebrated Scharlau-Mieroslowski contested election which, after two recounts, was not settled until three months later when the Illinois Committee on Elections ruled in Mieroslowski's favor.

== Early life and political career ==
Born in Alt Tellin, Germany on May 23, 1845, he was christened "Carl Johann Ludwig Ernst Scharlau" and assumed the name Charles E. Scharlau after immigrating to the United States in 1851. His family set down roots in Chicago, Illinois where Charles attended the Franklin Public School. At twelve years of age Charles apprenticed as a gilder, eventually becoming foreman of Rando & Company's picture frame establishment. In 1862, at seventeen years of age, he enlisted in Company G 57th Illinois Volunteer Infantry Regiment, then re-enlisted as a veteran at Lynnville, Tennessee, in December 1863. He served in the Sixteenth Army Corps under General Richard J. Oglesby, and in the Fifteenth Corps under Major-General John A. Logan. He was with the Army of the Tennessee on Sherman's March to the Sea, and was injured May 9, 1864, in the passage of the Oostanaula River, at the Battle of Resaca. He was in the Battle of Bentonville, NC, and was in the Grand Review of the Armies at Washington, D.C., May 23, 1865. Charles received his discharge in June 1865 and soon thereafter returned to Chicago to resume work at his trade.

=== Appointments and Positions ===
Charles was appointed Deputy Sheriff by Sheriff Tim Bradley in 1870, and remained in that position four years, and then served as Deputy County Collector under County Collector Louis Huck, and was Deputy Assessor for West Chicago under Assessor Pleasant Ansick. When Jacob Rehm was Chief of Police and Charles Rehm Chief of Detectives, Mr. Scharlau briefly held a position in the Detective force. In 1891 he was appointed General Inspector in the Board of Public Works by Mayor Hempstead Washburne, and held that position until the end of Mr. Washburne's term in 1893. In 1868 he was a delegate in the Republican County Convention, and was offered but declined the nomination for Supervisor of Chicago's Fourteenth Ward. He served as Central Committeeman and delegate to various State, County and City Conventions from 1868 onward.

=== Candidacies and Contested Election ===
In 1874 he became a candidate for the Illinois State House of Representatives and was defeated. In 1880 he was again a candidate, running against S. D. Mieroslowski, and out of this election the celebrated Scharlau-Mieroslowski contest arose. The ballots, after three counts, showed Scharlau ahead by 50 votes. But upon being taken to Springfield the Committee on Elections declared Mieroslowski elected by a margin of 8607 votes to 8548 for Scharlau.

In 1882 there were rival Senatorial conventions in the District, and Scharlau was the nominee of the Fourteenth Ward wing, but declined the nomination in favor of William E. Mason. In 1884 he was nominated and elected to the House of Representatives by the largest majority ever received by a candidate in the District, defeating August Wendel, a prominent and popular German. He was renominated for the House by acclamation on September 29, 1886, and was re-elected. While in the House he secured passage of the Park Bill, allowing an additional tax of half a mill for park improvements. He was a member of the Committee on Labor and Industrial Affairs, and a supporter of the Convict Labor Bill. In his later years he practiced law in Chicago, and was a member of the Kent Law School Class of 1894.
