= Moreton Morrell =

Village in Warwickshire, England

Coordinates: 52.201°N 1.546°W

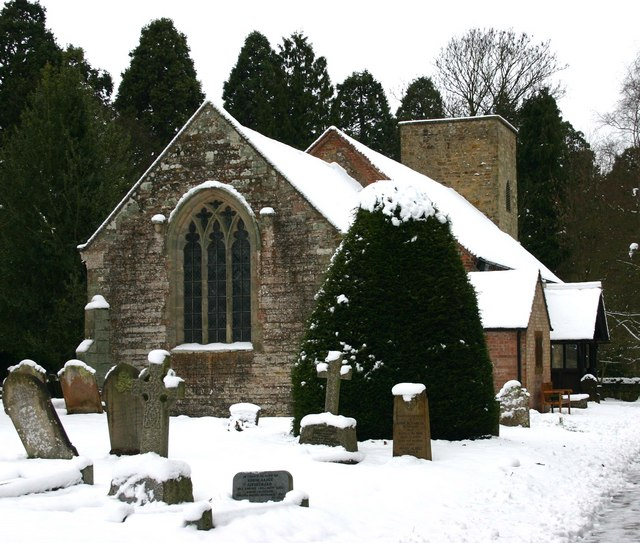
Church of the Holy Cross, Moreton Morrell

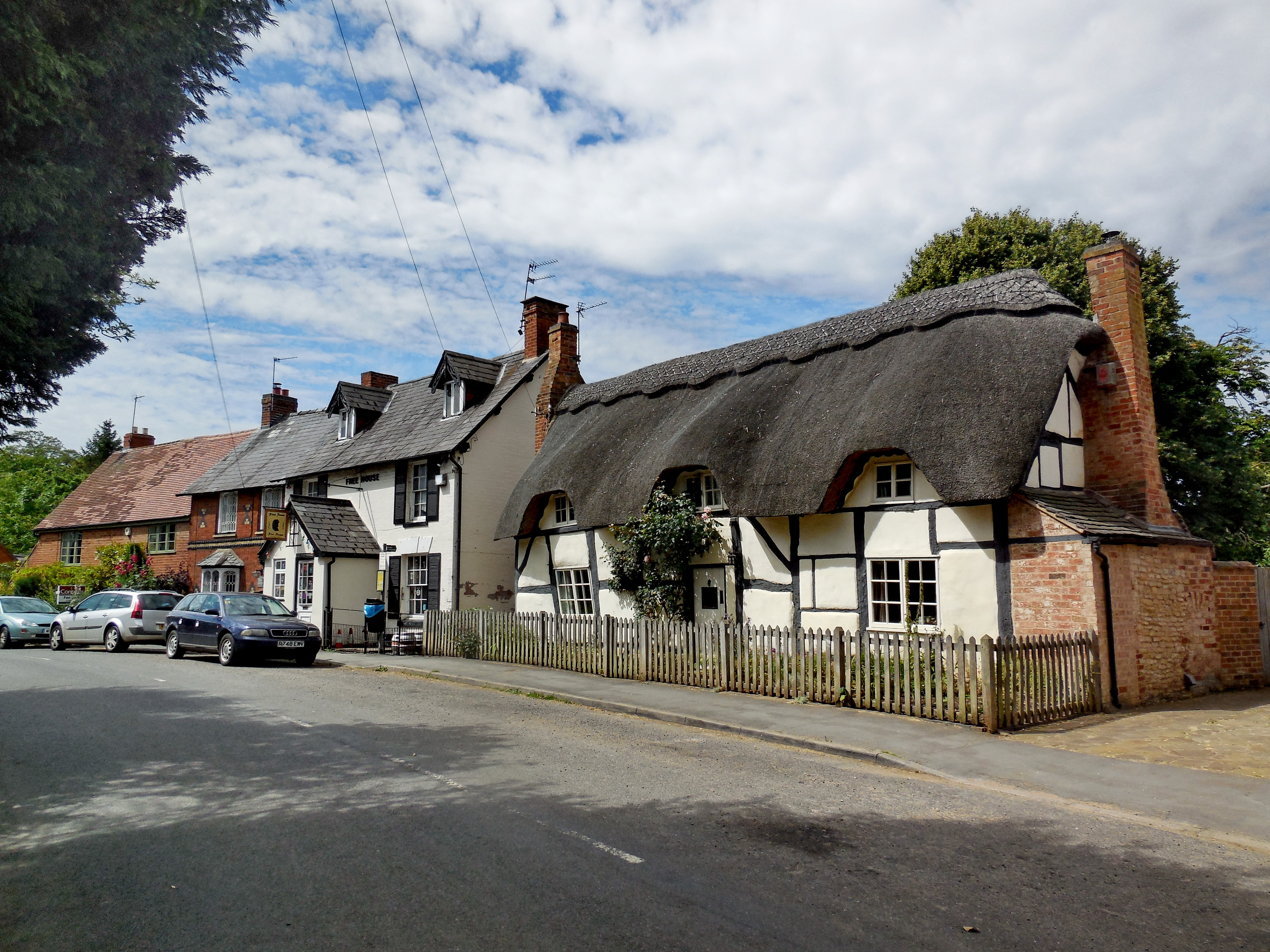
Village

Moreton Morrell is a village and civil parish in the county of Warwickshire, England. It is part of the historic hundred of Kington and is located about three and a half miles north west of the village of Kineton. The settlement was first mentioned in the Domesday Book as Moreton. From at least Norman times, it has consisted of the village of Moreton and the hamlet of Morrell. The parish of Moreton Morrell is bounded on the east and south east by the Fosse Way, and consists of Little Morrell in the north, the village of Moreton Morrell, and Moreton Paddox in the south.

The population in 1801 was less than 200 and very similar to that cited in the Domesday Book in 1086. In the same year the advowson of the vill was divided between the lands of the Earl of Warwick and the Earl of Leicester to support their respective chapels, but by the 14th century the Hospital of St. John at Warwick received the revenues. By 1961, the population had doubled and by 2001 it had doubled again to 800. The increase at the 2011 Census was to 850. Moreton Hall is a Grade II listed building in the village built on land bought in 1903 by Charles Tuller Garland, son of a rich New York banker. Construction of the hall was completed in 1909. In 1948 it became the location of the Warwickshire Institute of Agriculture, and is now the location of one of the campuses and agricultural training centres of Warwickshire College. It also provides equine courses. It was completely gutted by fire in 2008.

Moreton Paddox is built on the site of a large house of that name built at the beginning of the 20th century for Charles Garland's sister. The house was demolished in 1959. Nowadays, Moreton Paddox incorporates some of the original ancillary buildings and garden of the hall. The farmhouse and barns which were present before Moreton Paddox have been converted into homes. Charles Garland founded the Real Tennis Club in Moreton Morrell in 1905. Amy Robsart, wife of Robert Dudley often visited the village. Thomas Jefferson's great-grandfather William Randolph was born in the village in 1650 before moving to America at the age of 22. Randolph was also the ancestor of John Marshall, Paschal Beverly Randolph, Robert E. Lee, Peyton Randolph, Edmund Randolph, John Randolph of Roanoke, George W. Randolph, and Edmund Ruffin. There was a large military encampment in the village during World War II, housing a unit of the Czechoslovak Field Artillery. The village has a small primary school and one pub. There is an Anglican church, the Church of the Holy Cross.
