= David Beatty, 3rd Earl Beatty =

British peer

David Beatty, 3rd Earl Beatty (born 21 November 1946) is a British peer and photographer. Known from birth by the courtesy title of Viscount Borodale, in 1972 he succeeded his father as Earl Beatty and gained a seat in the House of Lords, but rarely attended.

== Early life ==
The son of David Beatty, 2nd Earl Beatty, and his second wife Dorothy Furey, he is also a grandson of the former First Sea Lord David Beatty, 1st Earl Beatty, and was educated at Eton College.

== Career ==
On 10 June 1972 he succeeded his father in his peerages.

As a photographer, Beatty has worked in the British Isles and in Africa.

== Personal life ==
In 1971 Beatty married firstly Anne Please; they were divorced in 1983, having had two sons:

- Sean David Beatty, Viscount Borodale (born 1973)
- Peter Wystan Beatty (born 1975)

In 1984, Beatty married secondly Anoma Corinne Wijewardene. They were divorced in 1997.

== Notes ==
Peerage of the United Kingdom
| Preceded by David Beatty | Earl Beatty; 1972–present | Incumbent; Heir: Sean Beatty, Viscount Borodale |
