= The Noble Sage =

Coordinates: 51.4906°N 0.1589°W

The Noble Sage is a contemporary art gallery in London. It was opened by Jana Manuelpillai in 2006.

The gallery specialises exclusively in Indian, Sri Lankan and Pakistani contemporary art and represents over thirty artists. The collection includes over 300 artworks, most of which are paintings and works on paper from South India, Pakistan and Sri Lanka.

== Exhibitions ==
- April 2006 – Jana Manuelpillai opened The Noble Sage. Drawn primarily from the alumni of the Government College of Fine Arts, Chennai, the first exhibition Chennai Excite featured works by seventeen contemporary Chennai artists, many of them residing in the Cholamandal and Padappai Artists Villages. The artists included senior figures of South Indian art, such as K. M. Adimoolam, S. Dhanapal and R. B. Bhaskaran and emergent artists like T. Athiveerapandian, P. Jayakani and Benitha Perciyal.
- May 2007 - In The Fore 2007 - Alphonso Doss, Rekha Rao, C. F. John and A. P. Santhanaraj
- August 2007 - India Now!- The Official Festival Exhibition- Collaborative exhibition with the Bharatiya Vidya Bhavan in Kensington for the Mayor of London’s INDIA NOW! festival with over thirty works from The Noble Sage collection.
- August 2007 - She, India: India through the eyes of its women. 'She, India' featured the work of nine female artists from India. Artists included: Gayatri Gamuz, Asma Menon, Eleena Banik and V. Anamika
- April 2008- Trilogy- M. Siva, Benitha Perciyal and N. Prasannakumar
- June 2008 - In The Fore 2009 - Achuthan Kudallur, Ganesh Selvaraj, P. Jayakani and T. Athiveerapandian
- September 2008 – Never Alone But Together- The drawings and sculptures of Ashok Patel
- October 2008- Tasaduq Sohail- Small oils and watercolours
- February 2009 - The Beating Heart of Kerala- The largest exhibition of works by artists from Kerala in the UK. The six artists included in the exhibition were Murali Nagapuzha, Manoj Vyloor, S. Ravi Shankar, T. R. Upendranath, A. S. Sajith and Pradeep Puthoor
- May 2009 - In The Fore 2009 - A. P. Santhanaraj, Anoma Wijewardene and Narayanan V.
- June 2009- January 2010 - Understanding Contemporary Art, Brent Museum
- October 2009 - Further Towards Nature. New abstract canvases by T. Athiveerapandian
- February 2010 - Chennai Revisited - Featuring V. Anamika, Shailesh BO, C. Dakshinamoorthy, Radha, N. Raghavan and G. Raman
- April 2010 - Tableau. New works by S. Ravi Shankar
- June 2010. The Vibrant World of Asia

== Asian Arthouse Film Night ==
The Noble Sage holds regular screenings of art house films from the Indian Subcontinent.

== Asian Literary Evenings ==
The Noble Sage has hosted literary evenings highlighting Asian writers and poets. They include:

- Rohan Candappa
- Ardashir Vakil
- Jaishree Misra
- Kamila Shamsie
- Jeet Thayil
- Aamer Hussein
- Romesh Gunesekera

== Sources ==
- Indian Art Since The Early 40s - A search For Identity, Cholamandal Artists' Handicrafts Association, Janatha Press, 1974
- Contemporary Indian Art, Glenbarra art Museum Collection, Japan, 1993
- Iromie Wijewardena Paintings, Gamini Jaisinghe, Sarvodaya Vishwa Lekha Publications, 2006
- Major Trends in Indian Art, Rm. Palaniappan, Lalit Kala Akademi, New Delhi, 1997
