= Spirit Trap =

- Directed by: David Smith
- Written by: Phil O'Shea; Rohan Candappa (additional material); Paul Finch (additional material)
- Produced by: Susie Brooks-Smith
- Starring: Billie Piper; Sam Troughton; Alsou; Luke Mably; Emma Catherwood
- Cinematography: Nick Sawyer
- Edited by: Simon Cozens
- Music by: Guy Fletcher
- Release date: 12 August 2005
- Running time: 91 minutes
- Country: United Kingdom
- Language: English

Spirit Trap is a 2005 British thriller horror film directed by Marcus Randall and starring Billie Piper. While the story is set in London, the film was shot in Bucharest, Romania.

== Premise ==
When five unsuspecting students move into a dilapidated mansion, a mysterious spirit clock, long since disused, is set into motion. As the walls of reality slowly fall away, and dark secrets are revealed, the group are thrown headlong into a downward spiral of paranoia, murderous intent and supernatural horror.
