= David Beatty, 2nd Earl Beatty =

British Conservative Party politician (1905–1972)

The Right Honourable The Earl Beatty DSC
- Beatty in 1935

Under-Secretary of State for Air
- In office 1945–1945
- Preceded by: Quintin Hogg
- Succeeded by: John Strachey

Member of Parliament for Peckham
- In office 27 October 1931 – 11 March 1936
- Preceded by: John Beckett
- Succeeded by: Lewis Silkin

Personal details
- Born: David Field Beatty; 22 February 1905
- Died: 10 June 1972 (aged 67)
- Party: Conservative
- Spouses: Dorothy Rice Power (m. 1937; div. 1945) Dorothy Rita Furey (m. 1946; div. 1950) Adelle Dillingham (m. 1951; div. 1958) Diane Kirk Blundell (m. 1959)
- Relations: Peter Beatty (brother); Ronald Tree (half-brother); Marshall Field (grandfather)
- Parent(s): David Beatty, 1st Earl Beatty; Ethel Field Beatty
- Education: Royal Naval College, Osborne; Britannia Royal Naval College

Military service
- Allegiance: United Kingdom
- Branch/service: Royal Navy
- Years of service: 1918–1945
- Rank: Commander
- Commands: HMS Boreas (1941); HMS Buxton (1940–41); HMS Puffin (1940)
- Battles/wars: Second World War: Dieppe Raid
- Awards: Distinguished Service Cross

David Field Beatty, 2nd Earl Beatty, DSC (22 February 1905 – 10 June 1972), styled Viscount Borodale from 1919 to 1936, was a Royal Navy officer and British Conservative Party politician.

== Early life ==
Beatty was born on 22 February 1905. He was the eldest son of Admiral of the Fleet David Beatty, 1st Earl Beatty and his wife Ethel. He had one brother, Peter Beatty. From his mother's first marriage to Arthur Tree (a son of Lambert Tree), he had an elder half-brother, Ronald Tree, who served as MP for Harborough and friend of Winston Churchill. Ronald was married to Nancy Keene Field (née Perkins) (widow of his first cousin Henry Field) and Marietta FitzGerald (née Peabody), a granddaughter of the Rev. Endicott Peabody.

His maternal grandfather was the American businessman Marshall Field. His father was the second son of five children born to Captain David Longfield Beatty and Katherine Edith Beatty (née Sadleir), both from Ireland: David Longfield had been an officer in the Fourth Hussars where he formed a relationship with Katrine, the wife of another officer.

Beatty was educated at the Royal Naval College, Osborne, on the Isle of Wight, and the Royal Naval College, Dartmouth. In 1919, he gained the courtesy title of Viscount Borodale when his father was created Earl Beatty.

== Career ==
In 1919, he gained the rank of midshipman in the service of the Royal Navy. He was promoted to the rank of lieutenant in 1928. He would later serve in the Leicestershire Yeomanry, part of the Territorial Army, and gained the rank of lieutenant in 1933.

Beatty, holding the rank of lieutenant commander, was awarded the Distinguished Service Cross in 1942.

=== Political career ===
From 1931 to 1936 he was the Member of Parliament (MP) for Peckham. His half-brother Ronald Tree also sat in Parliament at this time, as member for Market Harborough, Leicestershire. During his time in parliament he held the office of Parliamentary Private Secretary to the Parliamentary Secretary to the Admiralty from 1931 until 1936. He moved to the House of Lords when he succeeded as 2nd Earl Beatty on his father's death on 11 March 1936.

He also served as a member of the London County Council in 1937. In 1945, he served as Under-Secretary of State for Air in the Caretaker Government after the Second World War.

== Marriages and issue ==
Beatty married four times, the first three times to Americans:

- Firstly, on 21 April 1937, as her 4th husband, to Dorothy Carlotta Power (d.1966), a daughter of Thomas Stack Power, an American salesman, and an elder sister of General Thomas Sarsfield Power, United States Army Air Forces, who directed the dropping of atomic bombs on Japan. Dorothy was formerly the wife successively of LaFrance Adelbert Mitchell, Harry Estie Reynolds Hall, and Edward Van Volkenburgh Sands. Beatty and Dorothy divorced in 1945 after which she remarried fifthly to John Gordon Baragwanath, whom she divorced, and sixthly and lastly, on 10 December 1954, to Peregrine Francis Adelbert Cust, 6th Baron Brownlow.
- Secondly, on 7 February 1946, Beatty married Dorothy Rita Furey (1918–2006), a daughter of Michael James Furey of New Orleans, Louisiana and the widow of Sgt. Richard Edward Bragg, RAF. However between 1946 and 1950 she had an affair with Anthony Eden, the Conservative Party leader, and they divorced in 1950, having had one son:

- David Beatty, 3rd Earl Beatty (b. 1946), who in 1971 married Anne Please, whom he divorced in 1982, and remarried to Anoma Corinne Wijewardene in 1984.

- Thirdly, on 5 July 1951, he married Adelle Dillingham (d.1990), a daughter of M. Dillingham, of Oklahoma City and formerly the wife of William V. O'Connor of Los Angeles, California. They divorced in 1958 and in 1960 Adelle remarried to the American film director Stanley Donen. Beatty had one daughter by Adelle:
  - Lady Diana Beatty (b. 1952), who in 1974 married Nicolas Gage, 8th Viscount Gage from whom she was divorced in 2004.
- Fourthly and lastly, on 3 December 1959, he married Diane Kirk Blundell, a daughter of John Rutherford Blundell of Hayling Island in Hampshire. She was one of the last generation of debutantes to be presented to the Queen, in 1958. They remained married until his death. From his fourth marriage he had one son and one daughter:
  - Hon. Nicholas Duncan Beatty (b. 1961), who married Laura Keen (b. 1963), a writer, a granddaughter of Edward Curzon, 6th Earl Howe and sister of actor Will Keen and poet Alice Oswald.
  - Lady Miranda Katherine Beatty (b. 1963), who in 1989 married Alan Stewart, the youngest son of Sir Dugald Stewart of Appin. In 2000 she married secondly to Michael Hutchinson of Exminster.

== Death ==
Lord Beatty died on 10 June 1972 and was succeeded by his eldest son David Beatty, 3rd Earl Beatty. After his death his widow remarried in 1973 to Sir John Nutting, 4th Baronet.

Parliament of the United Kingdom
Preceded by John Beckett	Member of Parliament for Peckham; 1931–1936	Succeeded by Lewis Silkin
Political offices
Preceded by Quintin Hogg	Under-Secretary of State for Air; 1945	Succeeded by John Strachey
Peerage of the United Kingdom
Preceded by David Beatty	Earl Beatty; 1936–1972	Succeeded by David Beatty
