= David Beatty, 1st Earl Beatty =

Royal Navy Admiral of the Fleet (1871–1936)

Admiral of the Fleet The Right Honourable The Earl Beatty GCB OM GCVO DSO PC
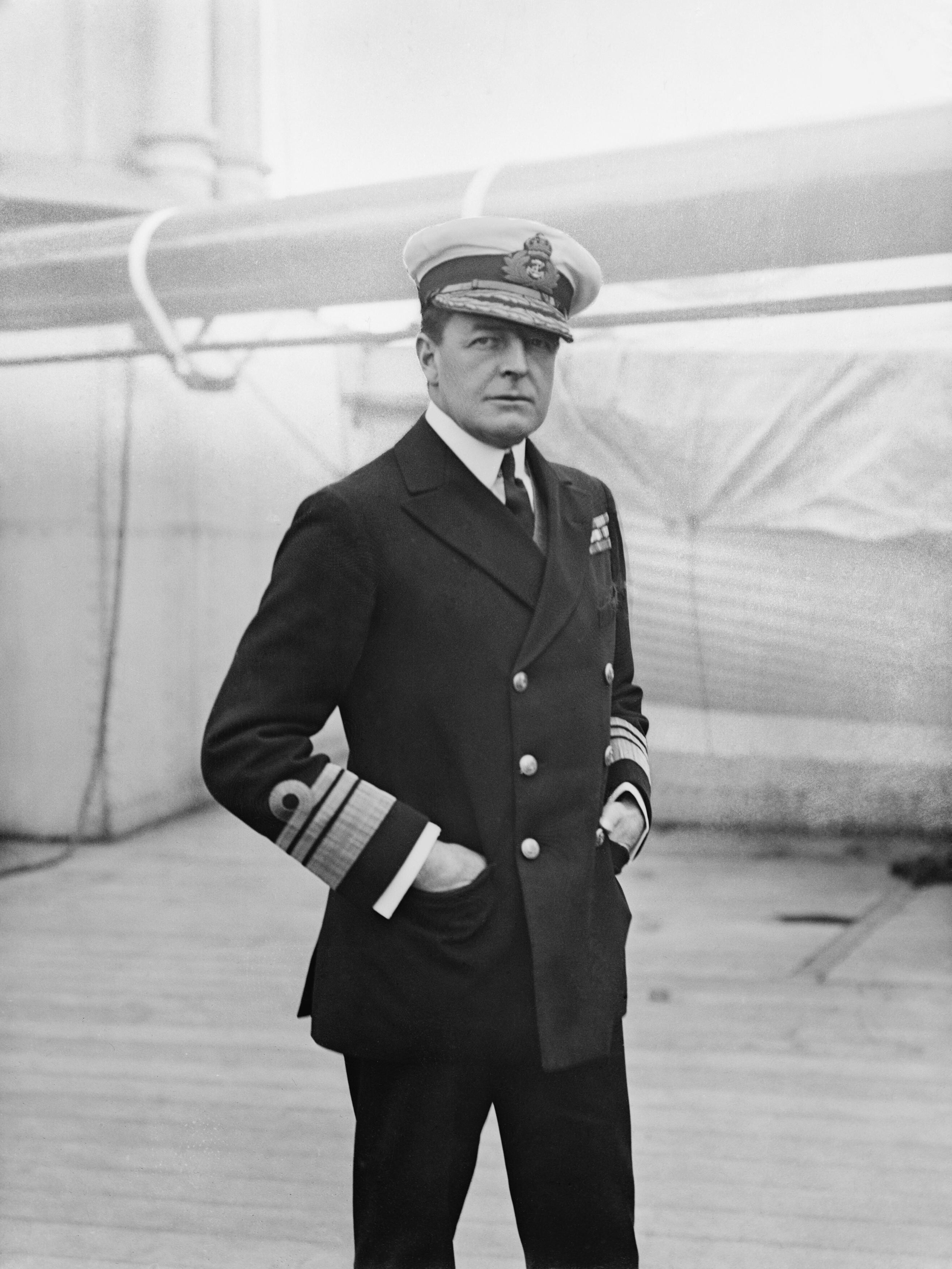
- Beatty in 1916
- Born: 17 January 1871; Stapeley, Cheshire, England
- Died: 12 March 1936 (aged 65); London, England
- Military career
- Allegiance: United Kingdom
- Branch: Royal Navy
- Service years: 1884–1927
- Rank: Admiral of the Fleet
- Commands: First Sea Lord (1919–27); Grand Fleet (1916–18); Battle Cruiser Fleet (1915); 1st Battlecruiser Squadron (1913–16); HMS Queen; HMS Suffolk; HMS Arrogant; HMS Juno
- Conflicts: Mahdist War; Battle of Dongola; Battle of Omdurman; Boxer Rebellion; Seymour Expedition; Battle of the Taku Forts (WIA); First World War; Battle of Heligoland Bight; Battle of Dogger Bank (1915); Battle of Jutland
- Awards: Knight Grand Cross of the Order of the Bath; Member of the Order of Merit; Knight Grand Cross of the Royal Victorian Order; Companion of the Distinguished Service Order

Admiral of the Fleet David Richard Beatty, 1st Earl Beatty (17 January 1871 – 12 March 1936) was a Royal Navy officer. After serving in the Mahdist War and then the response to the Boxer Rebellion, he commanded the Battle Cruiser Fleet at the Battle of Jutland in 1916, a tactically indecisive engagement after which his aggressive approach was contrasted with the caution of his commander Admiral Sir John Jellicoe. He is remembered for his comment at Jutland that "There seems to be something wrong with our bloody ships today", after two of them exploded.

Later in the war he succeeded Jellicoe as Commander in Chief of the Grand Fleet, in which capacity he received the surrender of the German High Seas Fleet at the end of the war. He then followed Jellicoe's path a second time, serving as First Sea Lord—a position that Beatty held longer (7 years 9 months) than any other First Sea Lord. While First Sea Lord, he was involved in negotiating the Washington Naval Treaty of 1922 in which it was agreed that the United States, Britain and Japan should set their navies in a ratio of 5:5:3, with France and Italy maintaining smaller ratio fleets of 1.75 each.

== Family and childhood ==
Beatty was born into an Anglo-Irish family at Howbeck Lodge in the parish of Stapeley, near Nantwich, Cheshire, on 17 January 1871. He was the second son of five children born to Captain David Longfield Beatty and Katherine (or Katrine) Edith Beatty (née Sadleir), both from Ireland: David Longfield had been an officer in the Fourth Hussars where he formed a relationship with Katrine, the wife of another officer.

After the affair between David Longfield and Katrine became known, David Longfield's father (Beatty's grandfather), David Vandeleur Beatty (1815–1881), arranged for his son to be posted to India in the hope that the scandalous relationship might end. David Longfield resigned from the regiment on 21 November 1865, with the honorary rank of Captain. He took up residence with Katrine in Cheshire and in 1869 sold his commission. David Longfield was unable to marry Katrine until Katrine had obtained a divorce on 21 February 1871, after the birth of their first two sons. Beatty's birth certificate recorded his mother's surname as Beatty, and his parents' eventual marriage at St Michael's Church in Liverpool was kept secret.

Beatty's early education concentrated on horsemanship, hunting and learning to be a gentleman. Beatty had a close relationship with his elder brother Charles, who became his ally against their oppressive and overbearing father. They remained close throughout life, so much so that the only time Beatty felt despair was at his brother's death. Beatty later wrote to his wife about Charles, we lived together, played together, rode together, fought together. His brothers would later join the British Army, but early on young David developed an interest in ships and the sea and expressed a desire to join the Royal Navy. In 1881 Beatty's grandfather died and David Longfield succeeded to the 18th century mansion, 'Borodale', outside Enniscorthy, in County Wexford. After retiring from the army David Longfield established a business training horses first in Cheshire and then at 'The Mount', near Rugby, Warwickshire. On inheriting and following the death of his wife at 'The Mount', David Longfield returned to Ireland abandoning the training business.

Beatty was educated at Kilkenny College and in 1882 entered Burney's Naval Academy at Gosport, which was a 'crammer' for boys wishing to take the entrance examinations for the Royal Navy.

== Early career ==
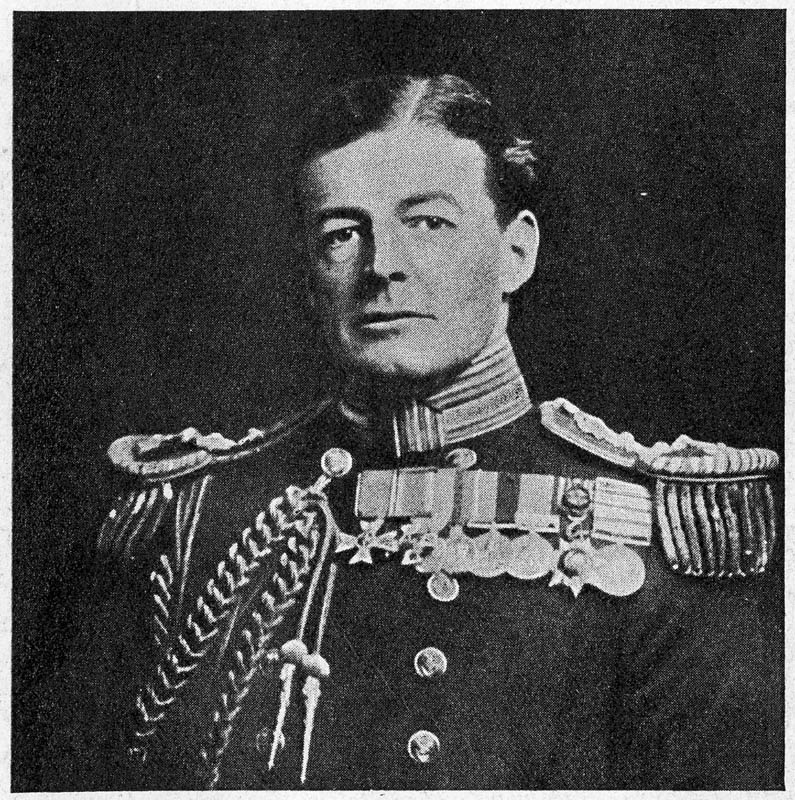
Captain David Beatty

Beatty joined the Royal Navy as a cadet passing into the training ship HMS Britannia tenth out of ninety-nine candidates in January 1884. During his two years at Britannia, moored at Dartmouth, he was beaten three times for various infractions. He passed out of Britannia eighteenth out of the thirty-three remaining cadets at the end of 1885. Beatty's letters home made no complaint about the poor living conditions in Britannia, and generally he was extrovert, even aggressive, and resented discipline. However, he understood how far he could transgress without serious consequences, and this approach continued throughout his career.

Beatty was given orders to join the China Station in January 1886, but the posting did not appeal to his mother, who wrote to Lord Charles Beresford, then a senior naval officer, member of parliament and personal friend, to use his influence to obtain something better. Beatty was, in February 1886, instead appointed to HMS Alexandra, flagship of Admiral the Duke of Edinburgh, Queen Victoria's second son, who was Commander-in-Chief of the Mediterranean Squadron. This proved an excellent social opening for Beatty, who established a longstanding relationship with the Duke's eldest daughter, Marie, and with other members of the court. Alexandra was a three-masted sailing ship with auxiliary steam power, nonetheless, remaining flagship in a navy which was steadily transitioning from sail to steam. Life in the Mediterranean fleet was considerably easier than cadet life, with visits to friendly ports all around the Mediterranean, but Beatty was concerned to work diligently towards naval examinations, which would determine seniority and future promotion prospects. Beatty was promoted to midshipman on 15 May 1886 and assigned to assist Lieutenant Stanley Colville on watchkeeping duties: Colville was to play an important part in Beatty's future career.

Beatty left HMS Alexandra in March 1889 and joined the cruiser HMS Warspite in July 1889 for manoeuvres before joining the sailing corvette HMS Ruby in September 1889, in which he was promoted to sub-lieutenant on 14 May 1890. Next he attended courses at the Royal Naval College, Greenwich during which he was somewhat distracted from his naval career by the delights of London. Beatty scored a first-class examination pass in Torpedoes, but only seconds in Seamanship, Gunnery and Pilotage, and a third in Navigation. A biography states that "his cabin at Greenwich was full of photographs of actresses, some of which were signed in the most endearing terms". After attending the gunnery school, HMS Excellent, he undertook a posting to a torpedo boat in July 1891 and then a tour in HMS Nile from 19 January 1892.

Beatty joined the Royal Yacht Victoria and Albert in July 1892 while Queen Victoria was holidaying in the Mediterranean: Victoria was in mourning for her grandson, Albert Duke of Clarence, who had died January 1892. Promoted to lieutenant on 25 August 1892, he rejoined HMS Ruby in August 1892 and then transferred to the battleship HMS Camperdown in September 1893 (which had only recently been involved in the fleet accident where she had rammed and sunk the battleship HMS Victoria). He transferred to the battleship HMS Trafalgar in September 1895.

== Sudan Campaign ==
Beatty gained recognition during the Mahdist War for his actions in the campaign to recapture the Sudan. Stanley Colville was placed in command of the gunboats attached to the British expeditionary force in Egypt and as Beatty's former commander in HMS Trafalgar and superior in HMS Alexandra he requested that Beatty join him. Control of the river Nile was considered vitally important for any expedition into Egypt and the Sudan. Beatty was seconded to the Egyptian government on 3 June 1896 and appointed second in command of the river flotilla. Colville was wounded during the operation, leaving Beatty in command of the gunboats for the successful attack on Dongola. The campaign halted at Dongola to regroup and Beatty returned to Britain on leave. He was commended by Kitchener for his part in the campaign and as a result was appointed a Companion of the Distinguished Service Order.

Beatty was again seconded to the Egyptian government for the next phase of the campaign. This was now at Lord Kitchener's specific request, for the Khartoum expedition. Beatty first commanded the gunboat El Teb but this was capsized attempting to ascend the Fourth Cataract. Beatty then took command of gunboat Fateh between October 1897 and August 1898: the gunboats were frequently in action advancing along the Nile ahead of the army and saw action at the Battle of Omdurman, where Beatty made the acquaintance of Winston Churchill who had become a cavalry officer in Beatty's father's old regiment, the 4th Hussars, and had there learnt his family history. In a few hours 10,000 Dervishes were killed by rifle and machine gun fire without any of them getting within 600 yards of the British force. This battle marked the effective end of resistance to the expeditionary force, but the gunboats were called into service to transport troops to Fashoda, 400 miles (640 km) south along the White Nile, where a small force of French troops had made a difficult land crossing and staked a claim to the area. Despite the ensuing crisis, the French were persuaded to withdraw without incident. Kitchener commended Beatty for his efforts in the campaign and as a result Beatty was promoted to commander, ahead of 400 other lieutenants, on 15 November 1898.

== Boxer Rebellion ==
Beatty was appointed executive officer of the small battleship HMS Barfleur, flagship of the China Station, on 20 April 1899. The first year of his tour of duty was uneventful, but unrest against foreigners was growing in China. The Boxer movement was a secret Chinese peasant society committed to resisting oppression both from foreigners and from the Chinese government. The Empress Dowager Tzu-hsi partly encouraged the Boxer's opposition to foreigners in an attempt to turn their attention away from herself. The name was derived from ritual exercises supposed to make their users immune to bullets, which resembled boxing.

In the summer of 1900 the rebellion reached Peking, where the German legation was attacked and foreign nationals withdrew to the relative safety of the Legation Quarter. Government troops joined forces with the rebels and the railway to the Treaty Port of Tientsin was interrupted. Admiral Sir Edward Seymour, then the Commander-in-Chief of the China Station, sent reinforcements to Peking, but they were insufficient to defend the legation. An attempt was therefore made to send more troops from Tientsin, where British ships had been joined by French, German, Russian, American, Austrian, Italian and Japanese. The international naval brigade force of naval marines placed itself under the senior officer present, which was Seymour. After an urgent call for help from the legation, Seymour set out on 10 June 1900 with 2,000 troops to attempt to break through to Peking in the Seymour Expedition. The force got about halfway before abandoning the attempt because the railway line had been torn up. By now rebels had begun destroying the track behind the force, cutting it off from Tientsin.

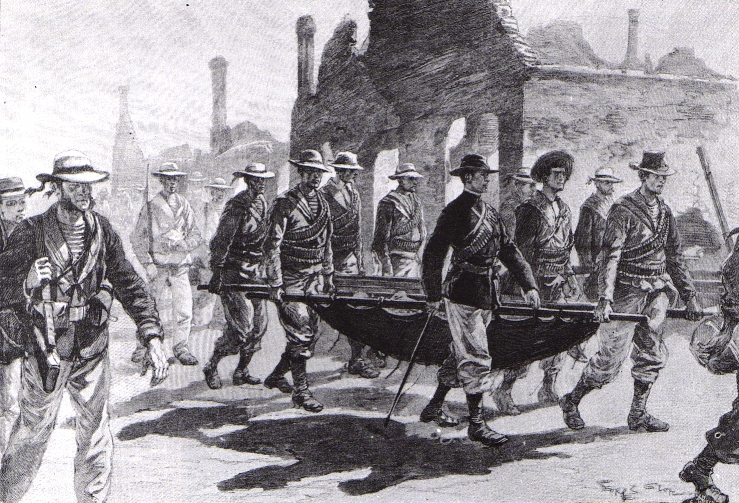
Admiral Seymour returning to Tientsin with wounded men

On 11 June 1900, Beatty and 150 men from HMS Barfleur landed as part of a force of 2,400 defending Tientsin from 15,000 Chinese troops plus Boxers. On 16 June 1900 the Taku forts were bombarded and captured to ensure ships could still reach the port. Fierce fighting broke out throughout the foreign areas and railway station, and Beatty was injured. He later took part in the successful relief of the naval brigade and was promoted to captain on 8 November 1900. Beatty returned to Britain, where he required an operation to restore proper use of his left arm.

== Marriage ==
Beatty had returned from leave after the Sudan campaign, but finding life at the family home in Ireland not to his taste, stayed instead with his brother at Newmarket, Suffolk. The location allowed him good hunting, and access to aristocratic houses where his recent heroic reputation from the campaign made him an honoured guest. Out hunting one day he chanced to meet Ethel Tree, daughter of Chicago department store founder Marshall Field. Beatty was immediately taken with her, for her good looks and her ability to hunt. The immediate difficulty with the match was that Ethel was married already to Arthur Tree, with a son, Ronald Tree.

After the Boxer Campaign, the couple had at first exchanged letters, which Beatty signed 'Jack', as Ethel was still a married woman and discretion was advised. Ethel became involved with another man and the exchange of letters ceased but on Beatty's return she sent him a telegram and letter inviting him to resume their friendship. Beatty did not respond until after surgery on his arm in September 1900 when he wrote, "I landed from China with my heart full of rage, and swore I did not care if I ever saw you again, or if I were killed or not. And now I have arrived with the firm determination not to see you at all in my own mind... Unfortunately I shall go on loving you to the bitter end... To me always a Queen, if not always mine, Good-bye."

Despite this estrangement, the couple again met foxhunting and resumed a discreet relationship. Marshall Field was at first unimpressed by the impecunious Beatty as a future son-in-law, but was persuaded by his heroic reputation, impressive record of promotion and future prospects. There was the possibility that Field might revoke the settlement he had made on his daughter at the time of her first marriage and the new couple would have no means of support. Beatty's father was also unhappy about the match, fearing a repeat of the difficulties he had faced with his own relationship with a married woman, but with the added risk of publicity because both Beatty and Ethel were famous and the risk that Beatty's illegitimacy might be exposed. Beatty went so far as to consult a fortune teller, Mrs. Roberts, who predicted a fine outcome to the match. Ethel wrote to Arthur, telling him that it was her firm intention never to live with him again as his wife, though not naming any particular person or reason. Arthur agreed to co-operate, and filed for divorce in America on the grounds of desertion, which was granted 9 May 1901. Beatty and Ethel married on 22 May 1901 at the registry office, St. George's, Hanover Square, London, with no family attending. Although Arthur Tree was himself from a wealthy American family, he now had to adjust to reduced circumstances without Ethel's support. He elected to remain in Britain and their son Ronald remained with him. Ronald and his mother were never reconciled from his perception that she had deserted his father, but he visited in later life and became friendly with Beatty. Ronald later became a member of parliament and, during the Second World War became a link between the British and United States governments, lending his country house, Ditchley Park near Oxford, to Winston Churchill for weekend visits when the official residences were considered unsafe. Beatty and Ethel set up home at Hanover Lodge in Regent's Park, London.

The couple had two sons, David Field Beatty, 2nd Earl Beatty (1905–1972) born at the Capua Palace in Malta, and the Hon. Peter Randolph Louis Beatty (1910–1949). His marriage to a very wealthy heiress allowed Beatty an independence that most other officers lacked. She is reputed to have commented after he was threatened with disciplinary action following the straining of his ship's engines, "What? Court-martial my David? I'll buy them a new ship."

== Advancement ==
In May 1902 Beatty was passed fit for sea duty and was appointed captain of the cruiser HMS Juno on 2 June, spending two months in exercises with the Channel Fleet under Admiral Sir Arthur Wilson before joining the Mediterranean Fleet. Beatty worked hard to raise efficiency so that she was highly rated in gunnery and other competitions by the time he left the ship 19 December 1902. Ethel decided not to be left behind so rented the Capua Palace on Malta, home port of the Mediterranean Fleet, where she became part of the island's high society.

Beatty took command of the cruiser HMS Arrogant in the Mediterranean Fleet in November 1903 and then commanded the cruiser HMS Suffolk in the Mediterranean Fleet from October 1904. He then became the naval advisor to the Army Council in 1906 and, after having been appointed a naval Aide-de-Camp to the King on 5 November 1908, he became captain of the battleship HMS Queen in the Atlantic Fleet in December 1908. At the request of Alfred Winsloe, the Fourth Sea Lord, he was promoted to rear-admiral on 1 January 1910 by a special order in council since he had not completed the requisite time as a captain. He was offered the post of second-in-command of the Atlantic Fleet, but declined it and asked for one in the Home Fleet. As the Atlantic Fleet post was a major command, the Admiralty were very unimpressed and his attitude nearly ruined his career. Beatty, as a rapidly promoted war hero, with no financial worries and with a degree of support in Royal circles, felt more confident than most naval officers in standing firm on requesting a posting nearer home. He was approaching two years on half pay (which would trigger automatic retirement from the navy) when on 8 January 1912 his career was saved by the new First Lord of the Admiralty, Winston Churchill. Churchill had met Beatty when Beatty was commander of a gunboat on the Nile supporting the army at the Battle of Omdurman, in which Churchill took part as a cavalry officer. A "probably apocryphal" story relates that as Beatty walked into Churchill's office at the Admiralty, Churchill looked him over and said, "You seem very young to be an Admiral." Unfazed, Beatty replied, "And you seem very young to be First Lord." Churchill – who was himself only thirty-eight years old in 1912 – took to him immediately and he was appointed Naval Secretary.

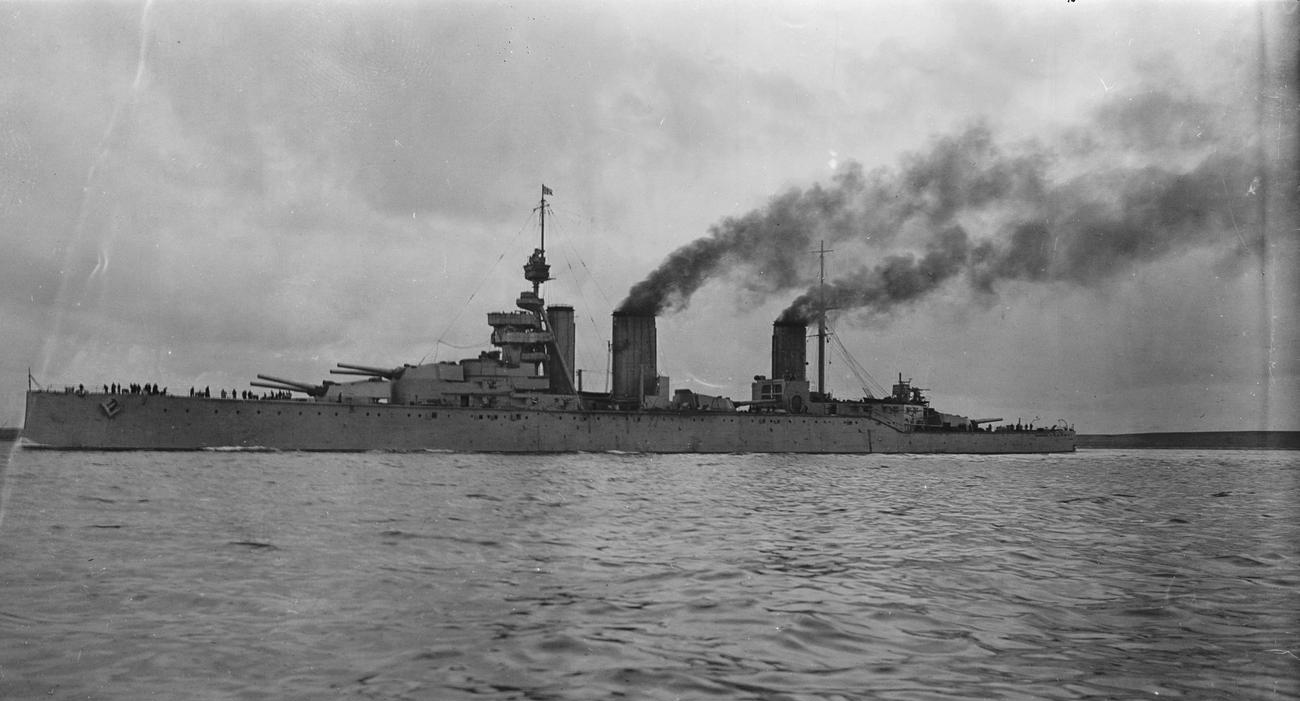
HMS Lion, flagship of the battlecruiser squadron

Beatty became Rear-Admiral Commanding the 1st Battlecruiser Squadron on 1 March 1913. Beatty was late taking up his new post, choosing not to cut short a holiday in Monte Carlo. On his eventual arrival, he set about drafting standing orders regarding how the squadron was to operate. He noted, "Captains...to be successful must possess, in a marked degree, initiative, resource, determination, and no fear of accepting responsibility". He went on "...as a rule instructions will be of a very general character so as to avoid interfering with the judgement and initiative of captains...The admiral will rely on captains to use all the information at their disposal to grasp the situation quickly and anticipate his wishes, using their own discretion as to how to act in unforeseen circumstances..." The approach outlined by Beatty contradicted the views of many within the navy, who felt that ships should always be closely controlled by their commanding admiral, and harked back to reforms attempted by Admiral George Tryon. It is argued that Tryon had attempted to introduce greater independence and initiative amongst his captains, which he believed would be essential in the confusion of a real war situation, but had ironically been killed in an accident caused by captains rigorously obeying incorrect but precise orders issued by Tryon himself.

Beatty chose Lieutenant Ralph Seymour as his flag lieutenant, despite Seymour being unknown to him. Seymour had aristocratic connections, which may have appealed to Beatty since he sought connections in society, but it was also the case that Seymour's sister was a longstanding close friend of Churchill's wife. Appointments by influence were common in the navy at this time, but the significance of Beatty's choice lay in Seymour's relative inexperience as a signals officer, which later resulted in difficulties in battle.

== First World War ==
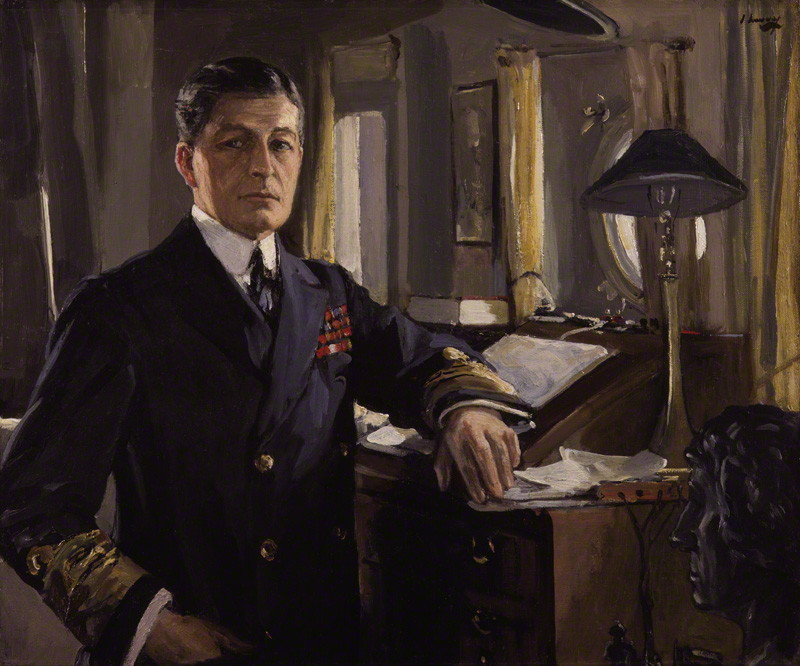
David Beatty in 1917, by John Lavery

On the eve of the First World War in 1914, Beatty was appointed a Knight Commander of the Order of the Bath and promoted to acting vice-admiral in February 1915 and given command of the Battle Cruiser Fleet a month later. He was confirmed in the rank of vice-admiral on 9 August 1915. He led the 1st Battlecruiser Squadron at the actions at Heligoland Bight (1914), Dogger Bank (1915) and Jutland (1916).

Jutland proved to be decisive in Beatty's career, despite the loss of two of his battlecruisers. Beatty is reported to have remarked (to his Flag Captain, Ernle Chatfield, later First Sea Lord in the early 1930s), "there seems to be something wrong with our bloody ships today," after two of them had exploded within half an hour during the battle. In any case Beatty's actions succeeded in drawing the German High Seas Fleet into action against the British Grand Fleet.

Beatty succeeded Admiral John Jellicoe as commander-in-chief of the Grand Fleet and received promotion to the acting rank of admiral in December 1916. With his dashing style, he was the antithesis of his predecessor. Beatty's marriage was failing disastrously at the time, and the result was to be a decade-long love affair between Beatty and Eugénie Godfrey-Faussett, wife of Captain Bryan Godfrey-Faussett. Under Beatty's command the Grand Fleet maintained its dominance of the North Sea until the end of the War.

Beatty escorted the German High Seas Fleet to internment at Scapa Flow in November 1918 giving the order from his flagship HMS Queen Elizabeth that "the German Flag will be hauled down at sunset and will not be raised again without permission". This was not a lawful order, as the fleet remained the property of the German Government having been interned rather than having surrendered, but nevertheless Beatty enforced it.

== First Sea Lord ==
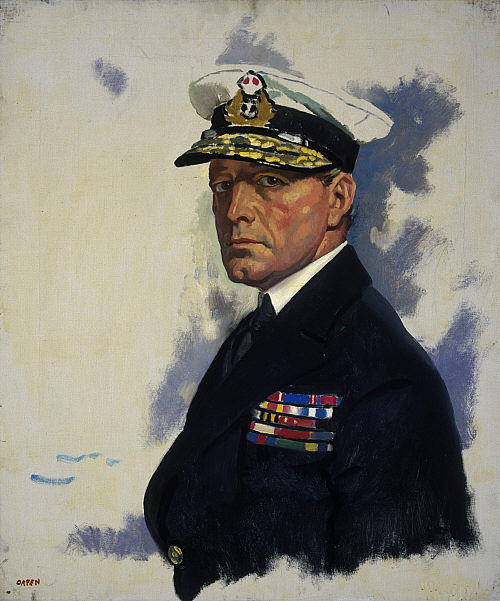
Portrait of Beatty by William Orpen

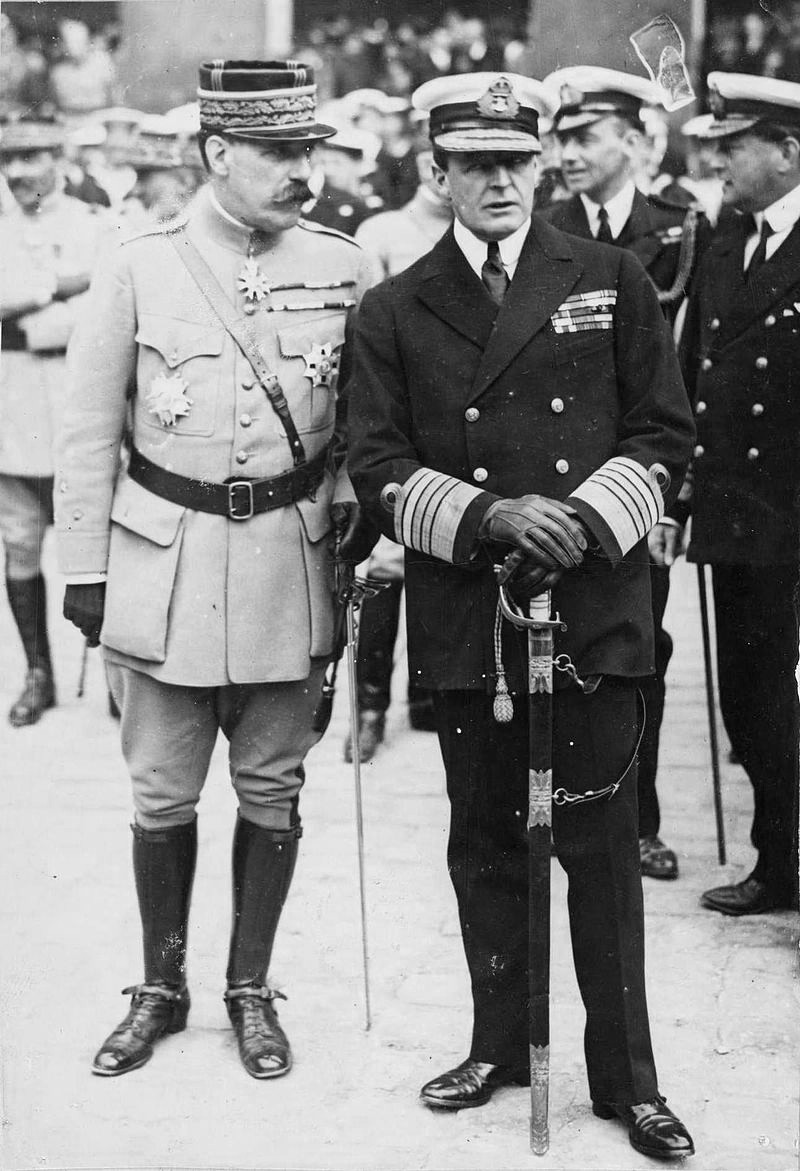
Admiral of the Fleet David Beatty in Paris, with French General Pierre Berdoulat

Beatty was promoted to substantive full admiral on 1 January 1919 and to Admiral of the Fleet on 1 May 1919. He was created 1st Earl Beatty, Viscount Borodale and Baron Beatty of the North Sea and Brooksby on 18 October 1919. He became First Sea Lord on 1 November 1919. In this capacity he was involved in negotiating the Washington Naval Treaty of 1922 in which it was agreed that the United States, Britain and Japan should set their navies in a ratio of 5:5:3, with France and Italy maintaining smaller fleets.

During the First Labour Government of 1924, with Japan increasingly hostile to the UK, Beatty lobbied the Clynes Committee for construction of the Singapore Naval Base to continue. Beatty wrote out, but did not send, a threat of resignation. The government were trying to cut back on the numbers of cruisers constructed; the other Sea Lords attributed the building of the Kent class to Beatty's lobbying, but government desire to alleviate shipyard unemployment was probably a more important factor.

Despite further rumours that he would resign, Beatty remained in office when the Conservatives took power in the autumn of 1924. Supported by the First Lord of the Admiralty William Bridgeman, he clashed with the new chancellor of the exchequer, Winston Churchill, once again over the number of cruisers required by the Royal Navy. At this stage of his career Churchill was opposed to what he saw as excessive defence spending. This may seem odd in light of his previous and subsequent reputation, but in the 1920s no major war seemed to be on the horizon. Beatty also at this time pressed hard for the return of responsibility for naval aviation from the newly formed Royal Air Force to the Royal Navy.

In 1926 Beatty was considered for the post of Governor General of Canada but was rejected by the colonial secretary Leo Amery as he had "no manners and an impossible American wife".

By the time of his retirement from the Royal Navy in July 1927 a great deal of time was being spent preparing for the Coolidge Conference in Geneva, although Beatty did not himself attend as he had to remain in London to supervise the deployment of naval and marine forces against nationalist unrest in China and Egypt. On his last day in office (30 July) he attended a Cabinet at which Bridgeman reported the breakdown of the Geneva Conference as the Americans refused to accept any gun smaller than 8-inch for their cruisers, and after leaving office he congratulated Bridgeman that the Americans had not been able to achieve "command of the sea at any cost". Beatty was appointed a member of the Privy Council on 25 July 1927. Stephen Roskill wrote that whilst Beatty and his disciple Chatfield deserve some praise for the Royal Navy's comparative readiness in 1939, his main achievement was to maintain the morale of the Navy at a time of serious defence cuts, and that without his strong leadership the Royal Navy might have suffered more events like the Invergordon Mutiny of 1931.

== Retirement and death ==
Beatty spent much of his life (when not at sea) in Leicestershire, and lived at Brooksby Hall and Dingley Hall. In July 1930 he denounced the London Naval Treaty in the House of Lords as "a great and deplorable blunder to which we are about to be committed by signing away the sea power by which the British Empire came into being". Beatty also stated: "If any sane man erects an edifice, or has great possessions, he protects them by insurance. The Navy is the insurance company of the economic unity of the Empire. Under the Naval Treaty of London the Navy will be totally and entirely inadequate to provide that insurance".

Beatty's old commander Admiral John Jellicoe died on 19 November 1935. Already suffering from heart failure, and sick with influenza, Beatty defied doctors' orders and left his bed to act as a pallbearer, saying, "What will the Navy say if I fail to attend Jellicoe's funeral?" He was so obviously ill that, as the funeral procession passed up Fleet Street, a bystander sent a glass of brandy out to him. He also insisted on attending the funeral of King George V in January 1936. These acts hastened his own death. Beatty died at around 1 am on 12 March 1936.

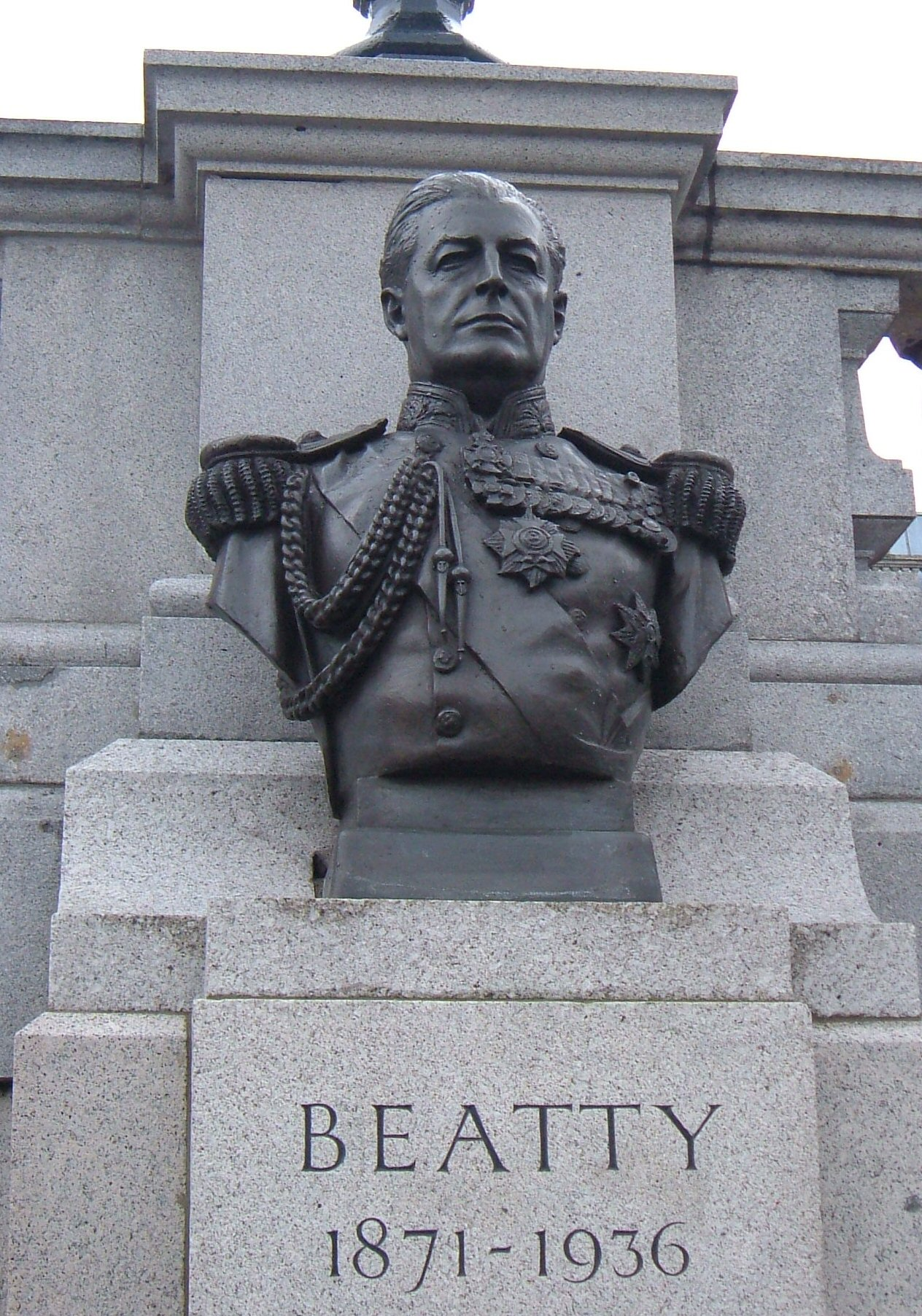
Bust of Beatty by William McMillan in Trafalgar Square, London. The two fountains were redesigned as memorials to Beatty and Jellicoe

At Beatty's funeral his coffin was draped in the Union Flag flown by his flagship HMS Queen Elizabeth in 1919. The archbishop of Canterbury, Cosmo Lang, said "In him something of the spirit of Nelson seemed to have come back". The prime minister, Stanley Baldwin, called in the House of Commons for a public memorial to Beatty to be erected, but no action was taken until after the Second World War, when busts of Beatty and Jellicoe were unveiled in Trafalgar Square on 21 October (Trafalgar Day) 1948.

Beatty had requested in his will that he would like to be buried next to his wife Ethel at Dingley: however he was actually buried at St Paul's Cathedral and therefore the double grave at Dingley Church contains only his wife's body.

== Assessment ==
The outcome of the Battle of Jutland was inconclusive, leading to controversy and a search for someone to blame, especially since the British lost more ships. Beatty was particularly unhappy with the official account of the battle and other historians took sides in support of him or Jellicoe. Beatty did not publish his analysis of the battle, while Jellicoe wrote two memoirs.

A number of serious errors have been identified in Beatty's handling of the Battle Cruiser Fleet at the Battle of Jutland:

- He failed to engage the German battlecruisers (the I Scouting Group) with all his ships, thus throwing away a two-to-one numerical superiority and instead fighting six-to-five. Beatty was given command of the 5th Battle Squadron to replace a squadron of battlecruisers away for training. These were four of the most powerful ships in the world, but he positioned them so far away from his six battlecruisers that they were unable to take part in most of the engagement with Admiral Hipper's squadron of five battlecruisers.
- Beatty did not take advantage of the time available to him between sighting the enemy and the start of fighting to position his battlecruisers to most effectively attack the enemy. At the point the German ships opened fire with accurately determined ranges for their guns, Beatty's ships were still manoeuvring, some could not see the enemy because of their own smoke, and hardly any had the opportunity of a period of steady course as they approached to properly determine target range. As a result, the German ships had a significant advantage in early hits, with obvious benefit. During this time he also lost the potential advantage of the larger guns on his ships: they could have commenced firing at a longer range than the German ships.
- He did not ensure that signals sent to his ships were handled properly and received by the intended ships. Lost signals added to the confusion and lost opportunities during the battle. This issue had already arisen in previous battles, where the same signals officer, Ralph Seymour, had been involved, but no changes had been made. Although Beatty was supposed to act as a fast armoured scout and report to Jellicoe the exact position of the German ships he encountered, or to keep in contact with the German fleet while he retreated to the main British Grand Fleet, he failed to do so. This information was important to Jellicoe to know how best to position the main fleet to make the most of its eventual engagement with the German High Seas Fleet. Despite this, Jellicoe succeeded in positioning his ships to good advantage, relying on other closer cruisers for final knowledge of the German's position, but necessitating last-minute decisions.
- Additionally, the gunnery of Beatty's ships was generally poor compared to the rest of the fleet. This was partly a consequence of his ships being stationed at Rosyth, rather than Scapa Flow with the main fleet, since local facilities at Rosyth were limited, but this was a problem identified months before Jutland which Beatty had failed to correct.

After the war a report of the battle was prepared by the Admiralty under First Sea Lord Rosslyn Wemyss. Before the report was published, Beatty was himself appointed First Sea Lord, and immediately requested amendments to the report. When the authors refused to comply, he ordered it to be destroyed and instead had prepared an alternative report, which proved highly critical of Jellicoe. Considerable argument broke out as a result, with significant numbers of servicemen disputing the published version, including Admiral Reginald Bacon, who wrote his own book about the battle, criticising the version sponsored by Beatty and highly critical of Beatty's own part in the battle.

Besides encouraging the publication of books and articles designed to praise his role at the Battle of Jutland and denigrate Jellicoe's, after his retirement Beatty assisted with the preparation of a 5,200 line poem "The Epic of Jutland" by Shane Leslie.

In 2022 U.S. Air Force Academy military historian Chuck Steele found Beatty's failures to improve communications between vessels before Jutland more glaring in light of his own personal awareness of how that had kept earlier victories at Heligoland Bight and Dogger Bank from being as overwhelming as they could have been. Gordon Moore, Steele writes, was transferred to the Canary Islands after the latter engagement not for his failures in it but for complaining about Beatty's poor communications to Churchill, then First Lord of the Admiralty and a strong supporter of Beatty's. Steele also argues that Beatty should also have known how to effectively use his battle cruisers due to the role they had played in smashing the German East Asia Squadron at the Falkland Islands. He faults Beatty for having learned too much from his earlier experience leading troops on land, and Churchill and others for being too impressed with Beatty as the supposed second coming of Horatio Nelson to see that unlike Nelson Beatty did not appreciate the value of newer naval technology.

== Honours and awards ==
(ribbon bar, as it would look today)

=== British ===
- Companion of the Distinguished Service Order (DSO) – 17 November 1896
- Knight Grand Cross of the Order of the Bath (GCB) – 31 May 1916 (KCB: 19 June 1914; CB: 19 June 1911)
- Knight Grand Cross of the Royal Victorian Order (GCVO) – 25 June 1917 (KCVO: 17 June 1916 Member Fourth Class (present-day Lieutenant) (MVO): 28 April 1905)
- Member of the Order of Merit (OM) – 3 June 1919
- Earl Beatty, Viscount Borodale of Wexford in the County of Wexford, Baron Beatty of the North Sea and of Brooksby in the County of Leicester – 18 October 1919

Beatty was granted the Freedom of the City of London on 16 June 1919 at the same ceremony as Lord Haig. In June 1920, the Great Central Railway gave the name Earl Beatty to one of their newly built 4-6-0 express passenger locomotives, no. 1164 of class 9P (LNER class B3). It carried the name until withdrawal in September 1947. In 1925, he became the president of the Society for Nautical Research.

=== Foreign ===
- Order of Majid, 4th Class (Nishan-i-Majidieh) of the Ottoman Empire – 3 October 1898
- Order of St George, Fourth Class of the Russian Empire – 25 August 1916
- Grand Officer of the Military Order of Savoy of the Kingdom of Italy – 11 August 1917
- Grand Cordon of the Order of the Rising Sun of the Empire of Japan – 29 August 1917
- Grand Cross of the Legion d'Honneur of France – 23 May 1919 (Grand Officer-15 September 1916)
- Croix de Guerre of France – 15 February 1919
- Grand Cross of the Order of the Star of Romania of the Kingdom of Romania – 17 March 1919
- Grand Cross of the Order of the Redeemer of the Kingdom of Greece – 21 June 1919
- Navy Distinguished Service Medal (United States) – 16 September 1919
- Grand Cordon with Brilliants of the Order of the Precious Brilliant Golden Grain of the Republic of China – 22 January 1920
- Grand Cordon of the Order of the Paulownia Flowers of the Empire of Japan – 20 January 1922

=== Namesakes ===
- Admiral Beatty Avenue in Mount Roskill, Auckland, was named as a tribute to Beatty in the late 1920s.
- Beatty Secondary School (Singapore), was named after him in 1953.

=== Arms ===
Coat of arms of David Beatty, 1st Earl Beatty
| Notes Granted 12 March 1919 by George James Burtchaell, Deputy Ulster King of Arms. Crest A demi-lion rampant Gules armed and langued Azure holding in the dexter paw a triumphal crown Or. Torse Of the colours. Escutcheon Quarterly 1st & 4th Azure a bee hive placed on a stand and beset with nine bees volant in chief a naval crown all Or (Beatty) 2nd & 3rd Gules a chevron Ermine between seven cross crosslets fitchee three fessways in chief and four in base Argent (Longfield). Motto Non Vi Sed Arte |

== Sources ==
- Beatty, Charles (1980). Our Admiral, a biography of Admiral of the Fleet Earl Beatty. London: W. H. Allen. ISBN 978-0-491-02388-7.
- Boddy, M.G.; Brown, W.A.; Fry, E.V.; Hennigan, W.; Hoole, Ken; Manners, F.; Neve, E.; Platt, E.N.T.; Proud, P.; Yeadon, W.B. (March 1975). Locomotives of the L.N.E.R., part 2B: Tender Engines – Classes B1 to B19. Lincoln: RCTS. ISBN 0-901115-73-8. OCLC 655688865.
- Boddy, M.G.; Fry, E.V.; Hennigan, W.; Proud, P.; Yeadon, W.B. (July 1963). Fry, E.V. (ed.). Locomotives of the L.N.E.R., part 1: Preliminary Survey. Potters Bar: RCTS.
- Brooks, John (2005). Dreadnought Gunnery at the Battle of Jutland: The Question of Fire Control. London: Frank Cass Publishers. ISBN 0-7146-5702-6.
- Harley, Simon (May 2017). "The Promotion of David Beatty to Rear-Admiral". The Mariner's Mirror. 103 (2): 213–216. doi:10.1080/00253359.2017.1304709. S2CID 164678083.
- Massie, Robert Kinloch (2003). Castles of Steel: Britain, Germany, and the Winning of the Great War at Sea. New York: Ballantine Books. ISBN 0-345-40878-0.
- Roskill, Captain Stephen Wentworth (1980). Admiral of the Fleet Earl Beatty – The Last Naval Hero: An Intimate Biography. London: Collins. ISBN 0-689-11119-3.

Military offices
| Preceded by Ernest Troubridge | Naval Secretary; 1912–1913 | Succeeded by Dudley de Chair |
| Preceded by Sir John Jellicoe | Commander-in-Chief, Grand Fleet; 1916–1919 | Fleet disbanded |
| Preceded by The Lord Wester-Wemyss | First Sea Lord; 1919–1927 | Succeeded by Sir Charles Madden |
Academic offices
| Preceded by Earl Kitchener | Rector of the University of Edinburgh; 1917–1920 | Succeeded by David Lloyd George |
Peerage of the United Kingdom
| New creation | Earl Beatty; 1919–1936 | Succeeded by David Field Beatty |
