= Ethel Beatty, Countess Beatty =

American socialite and aristocrat

Ethel Field
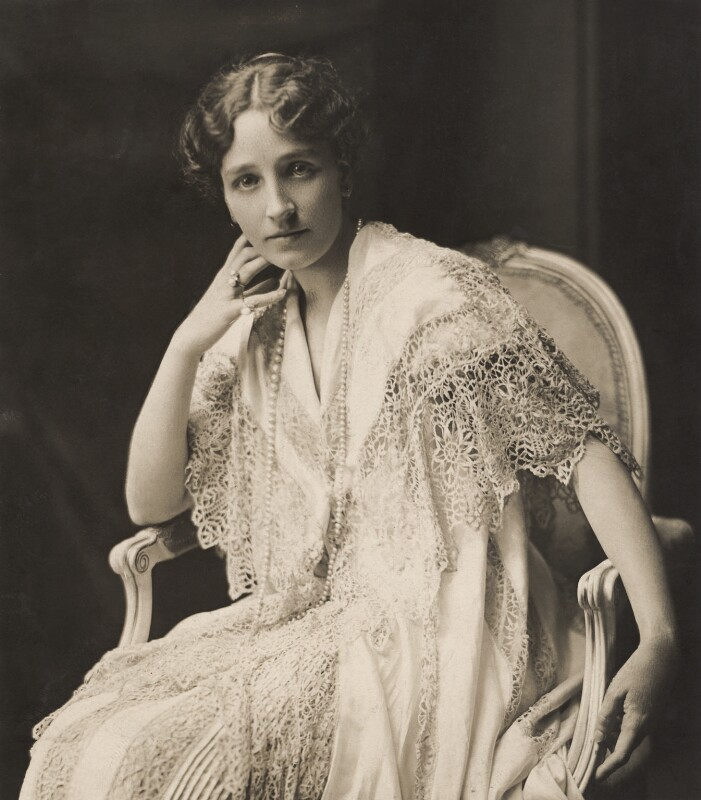
- Ethel in 1915
- Born: 1873; Cook County, Illinois, US
- Died: 17 July 1932 (aged 58–59); Dingley, Northamptonshire, UK
- Spouse: Arthur Magie Tree (m. 1891–1901) David Beatty, 1st Earl Beatty (m. 1901)
- Children: Ronald Tree; David Beatty, 2nd Earl Beatty; The Hon. Peter Beatty
- Parent(s): Marshall Field; Nannie Douglas Scott

Ethel Newcomb Beatty, Countess Beatty (née Field; 1873 – July 17, 1932) was a socialite and a member of the aristocracy. The daughter of American millionaire Marshall Field, she enjoyed a lavish lifestyle.

== Early life ==
Ethel was born in Cook County, Illinois in 1873. Her parents were Marshall Field, the founder of the American firm Marshall Field's, and his first wife, Nannie Douglas Scott. She had one full brother, Marshall Field Jr.

== Personal life ==
On January 1, 1891, Ethel married Arthur Magie Tree in an opulent ceremony held at the home of her parents, 1905 Prairie Avenue in Chicago. Arthur was the son of American diplomat Lambert Tree and the former Anna Josephine Magie. Together, they were the parents of three children, only one of whom survived to adulthood:

- Arthur Ronald Lambert Field Tree (1897–1976), who became a Member of Parliament and, during the Second World War became a link between the British and United States governments, lending his country house, Ditchley Park near Oxford, to Winston Churchill for weekend visits when the official residences were considered unsafe.

While married to Tree, she had an affair with British captain David Beatty. Ethel wrote to her husband, telling him that it was her firm intention never to live with him again as his wife, though not naming any particular person or reason. Arthur agreed to co-operate, and filed for divorce in America on the grounds of desertion, which was granted May 9, 1901.

=== Second marriage ===
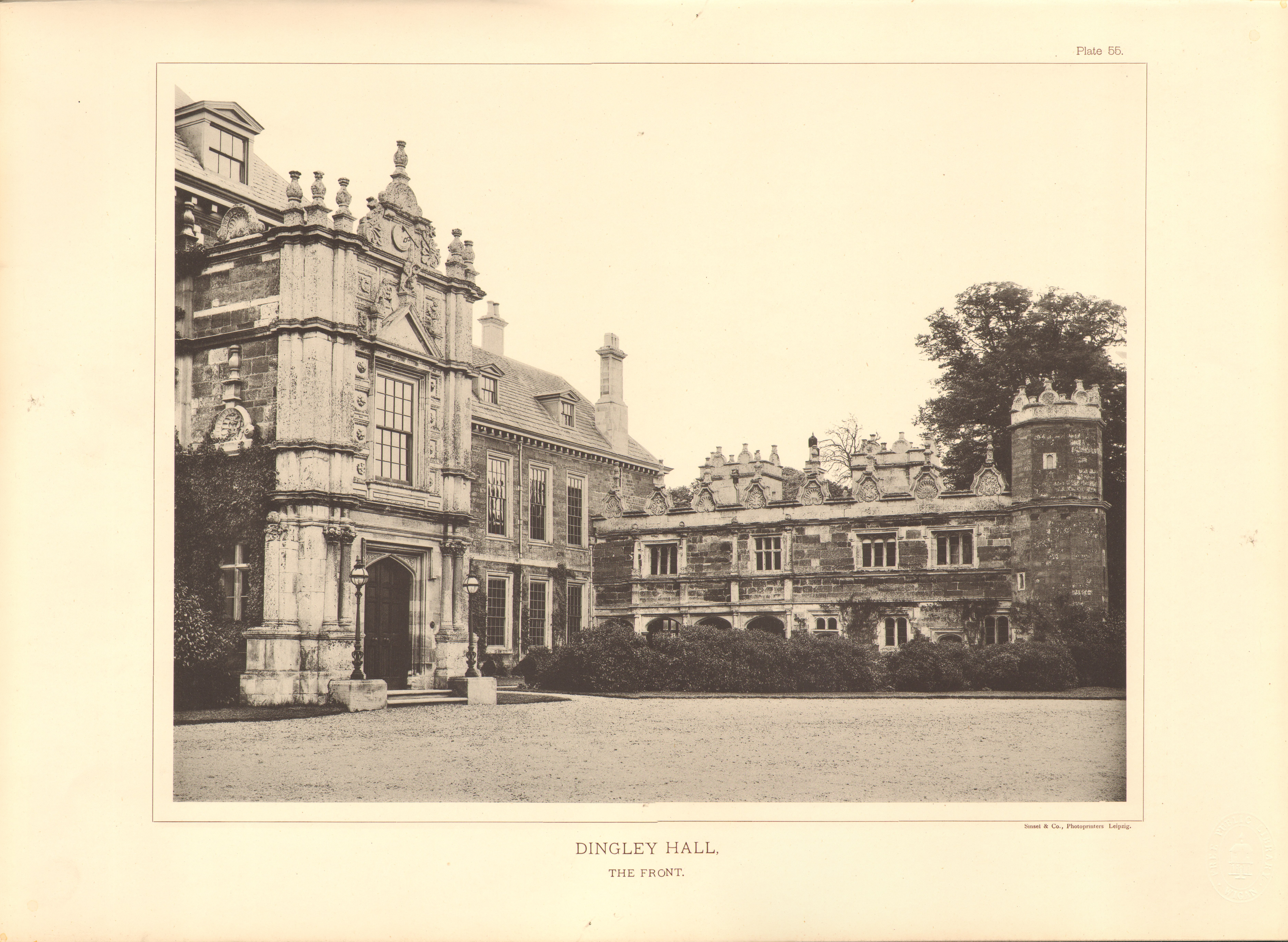
Dingley Hall

Ten days after her divorce from Tree was made public, she was married to David Beatty, 1st Earl Beatty on May 22, 1901, at the registry office, St. George's, Hanover Square in London with no family attending. The couple had two children:

- David Field Beatty (1905–1972), who married four times.
- Peter Randolph Louis Beatty (1910–1949), who never married and owned Mereworth Castle.

According to Robert K. Massie, Ethel Beatty was a poor mother, abandoning her son Ronald from her first marriage; she also left the children of her second marriage with her husband while she went on a gambling trip to Monte Carlo in 1912. Peter had birth complications that affected his eyesight and muscle control for the rest of his life, thought to originate from a venereal disease carried by Ethel. It was "generally accepted" in later years that Peter was illegitimate, the father being a "well-known member of the British aristocracy", according to a Beatty family member. In her obituary, it was noted that "her beauty and personality made her one of England's foremost hostesses. She and her husband often entertained King Edward VII at shooting parties in Scotland."

While David Beatty benefited by Ethel's wealth, it was not a happy marriage, "I am the most unhappy man in the world", David once said, "I have paid terribly for my millions". The result of which was his decade-long love affair with Eugénie Godfrey-Faussett, wife of Captain Bryan Godfrey-Faussett. In 1919, David was raised to the peerage when he became the first Earl Beatty, making Ethel Countess Beatty.

After a one-month illness, Lady Beatty died in her sleep on July 17, 1932, at Dingley Hall in Dingley, Northamptonshire. Lord Beatty died in London on March 12, 1936, and was succeeded in his titles by his eldest son, David.

=== Descendants ===
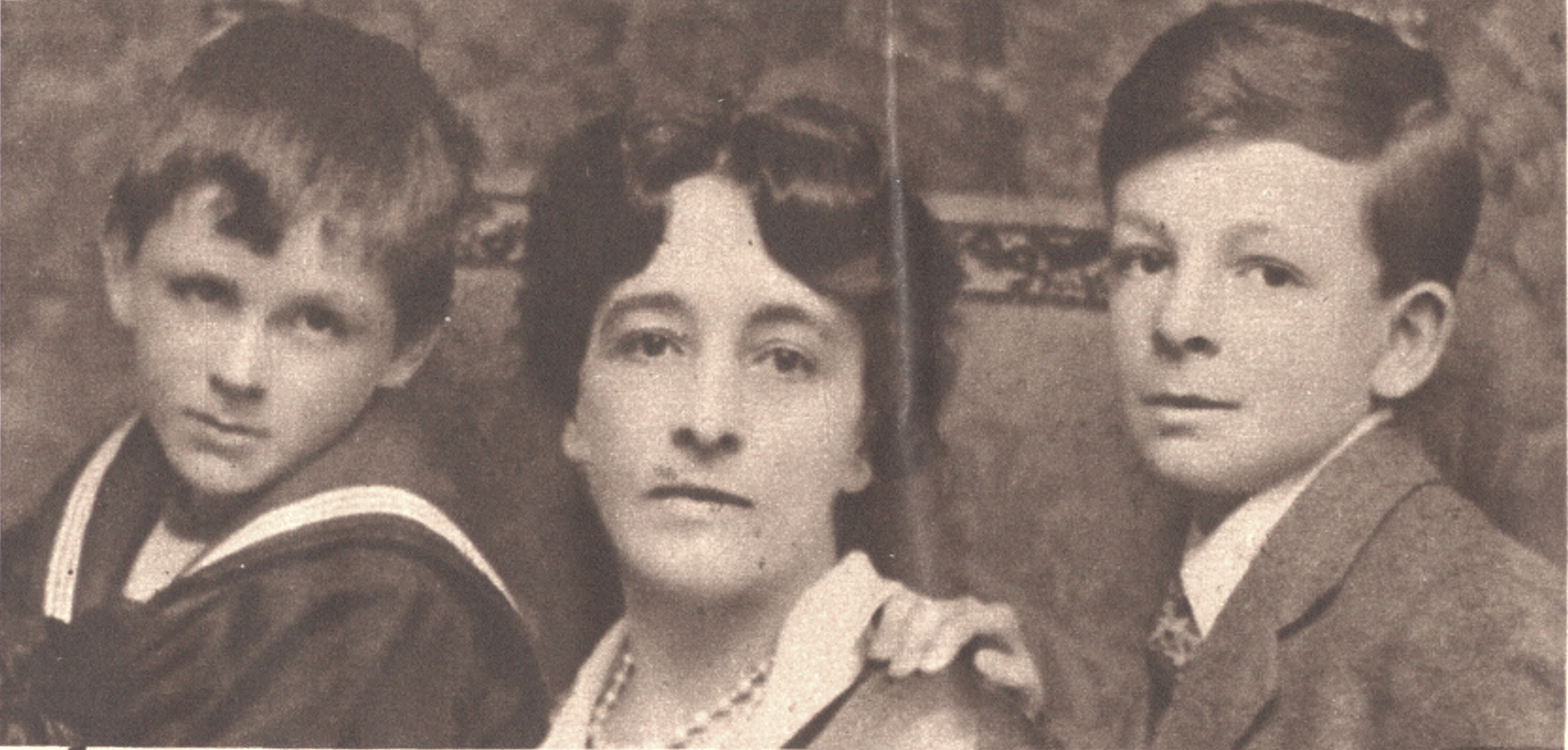
Lady Beatty and her two younger sons, David and Peter

Through her eldest son's two marriages (first to Nancy Perkins Field, a niece of Lady Nancy Astor, and second to Marietta Peabody), she was a grandmother of three, Michael Lambert, racehorse trainer Arthur Jeremy Tree, and fashion model Penelope Tree.

Through her second son David, who inherited the earldom, she was a grandmother of four, David Beatty, 3rd Earl Beatty, Lady Diana Beatty (wife of Nicolas Gage, 8th Viscount Gage), Hon. Nicholas Duncan Beatty (who married writer Laura Keen, a granddaughter of Edward Curzon, 6th Earl Howe and sister of actor Will Keen and poet Alice Oswald), and Lady Miranda Katherine Beatty (wife of Alan Stewart, youngest son of Sir Dugald Stewart of Appin).
