= Ray Wijewardene =

Sri Lankan innovator

Philip Revatha Wijewardene
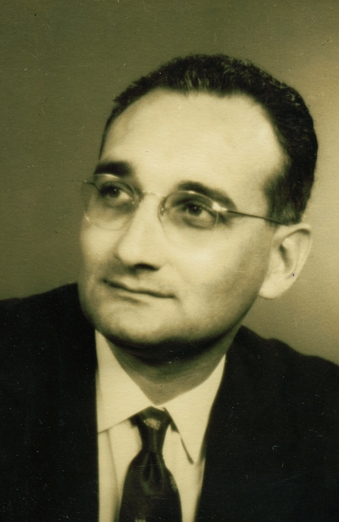
- Ray Wijewardene (Early 20s)
- Born: Philip Revatha Wijewardene; 20 August 1924; Colombo, Ceylon
- Died: 18 August 2010 (aged 85); Colombo, Sri Lanka
- Other names: Ray, Philip
- Education: C.M.S. Ladies' College, Colombo; St Thomas’ College Mount Lavinia; Peterhouse, Cambridge; Harvard Business School
- Occupations: Engineer, Farmer
- Known for: Two-wheel tractor
- Spouse: Seela de Mel
- Children: Anoma Wijewardene, Roshini, Mandy

Deshamanya Philip Revatha Wijewardene, better known as Ray Wijewardene, (Sinhala:පිලිප් රෙවත විජයවර්ධන) (20 August 1924 - 18 August 2010) was a Sri Lankan engineer, aviator, inventor, and Olympic athlete. He was an expert on tropical agriculture and natural resource management, subjects that he created a logical system to study. He invented devices to assist small farmers in developing countries.

== Early life ==
Wijewardene was born in Colombo, Ceylon, on 20 August 1924. He studied at CMS Ladies’ College, Colombo and St Thomas’ College Mount Lavinia, both private Anglican schools. He proceeded to Peterhouse, University of Cambridge, UK, where he studied aeronautical, mechanical and agricultural engineering and earned the degree of M.A. (Cantab). He qualified as a Chartered Engineer in the U.K. and Sri Lanka, and later followed a course in business administration at Harvard Business School.

== Career ==
During the 1970s, Wijewardene worked as an expert on tropical farming systems with the UN Food and Agriculture Organisation (FAO) and the World Bank. He was head of agricultural engineering at the Mechanization and Automation Research Centre (MARDI) in Kuala Lumpur, Malaysia, from 1973 to 1974. He served as head of agricultural engineering and research at the International Institute of Tropical Agriculture (IITA) in Ibadan, Nigeria (1975–1980).

Wijewardene worked with Sri Lanka's business, research, and policy communities in his areas of expertise. He held appointments such as Chairman of the Tea Research Board, Commissioner Sri Lanka Inventors Commission and was a member of public sector bodies concerned with agriculture, science and technology. He was Chancellor of the University of Moratuwa (2002–2007).

== Professional achievements ==
In 1955, Wijewardene designed a two-wheeled, walking tractor to help small farmers in the tropics to mechanise their work. In an early attempt to mechanise farm labour during the Green Revolution, it was manufactured and marketed worldwide by the Landmaster company. He promoted the tractor with farmers in Africa, Asia, and Latin America for a decade. Wijewardene later questioned its value for poor farmers cultivating small holdings in the developing world.

His lifelong interest was to help small farmers to grow more food with fewer external inputs. He searched for natural ways to manage soil fertility and weeds. He promoted a soil conservation technique called Sloping Agricultural Land Technology (SALT), originally developed in the Philippines. SALT involved land terracing, the use of leaf mulch, and re-introducing trees into rain-fed farming.

After returning to Sri Lanka in 1980, Wijewardene spent the rest of his years researching and promoting ecologically sustainable agriculture and renewable energy technologies. He experimented with rain-fed farming and agroforestry methods on his coconut estate in Kakkapalliya, in Sri Lanka's Intermediate Zone. He did field tests for dendro thermal power, the generation of electricity from firewood. This technology is increasingly used by industry. He introduced inter-cropping gliricidia with coconut, vastly increasing coconut yields.

== Sporting accomplishments ==
Wijewardene engaged in the water sports of rowing and sailing and represented Sri Lanka in international competitive events. He competed in the Olympic Games in Mexico in 1968, and won a Silver medal at the 6th Asian Games in Bangkok in 1970. He was a member of both the Colombo Rowing Club and the Ceylon Motor Yacht Club.

As an aviator, he held a pilot license to fly fixed-wing aircraft, helicopters and autogyros. He experimented with building and flying ultralight aircraft and helicopters, and trained pilots and aircraft technicians.

== Honours ==
- Vidya Jyothi - 1988 - Government of Sri Lanka
- Deshamanya - 2005 - Government of Sri Lanka

== Legacy ==
In 2014, a postal stamp honouring him was released in Sri Lanka. The Ray Wijewardene Charitable Trust was established in 2011 to support and reward Sri Lankan engineers.

== Family ==
Wijewardene's father was Don Edmund Wijewardene (brother of D. R. Wijewardena) and his mother was Corin Amanda Jennings, both of whom were gynaecologists. In 1949 Wijewardene married Seela, the daughter of Benjamin de Mel (a brother of Sir Henry De Mel) and Marjorie Perera Abeywardene (a granddaughter of Sir Charles Henry de Soysa). Anoma, Roshni and Mandy are their daughters. Anoma is an artist, and Mandy is married to prominent Sri Lankan author Suresh Mudannayake (known as Ashok Ferrey). His cousins were Upali Wijewardene and Junius Richard Jayewardene.

== Publications ==
- Systems and energy in tropical farming, American Society of Agricultural Engineers, 1978
- Letters: Exploding ‘roaches, New Scientist, 5 December 1992
