= Marshall Field =

American businessman (1834–1906)

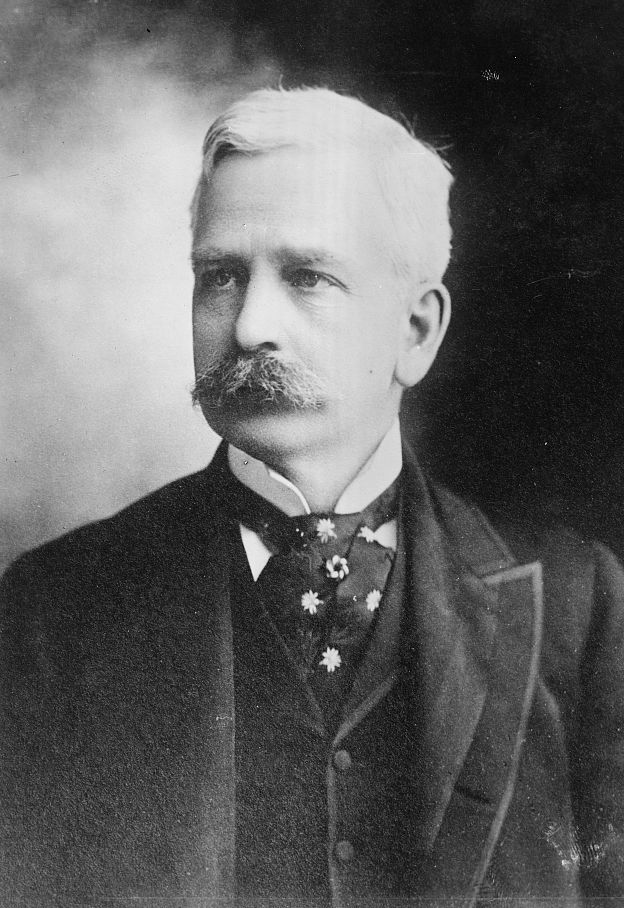
- Born: August 18, 1834; Conway, Massachusetts, U.S.
- Died: January 16, 1906 (aged 71); New York City, U.S.
- Occupation: Founder of Marshall Field and Company
- Spouses: Nannie Douglas Scott (m. 1863; died 1896); Delia Spencer (m. 1904)
- Children: 3, including Ethel

Marshall Field (August 18, 1834 – January 16, 1906) was an American entrepreneur and the founder of Marshall Field and Company, the Chicago-based department stores.

Field is also known for some of his philanthropic donations, providing funding for the Field Museum of Natural History and donating land for the campus of the University of Chicago.

== Early life ==
Marshall Field was born on a farm in Conway, Massachusetts, the son of John Field IV and Fidelia Nash. His family was descended from Puritans who had come to America as early as 1629.

At the age of 17, he moved to Pittsfield, Massachusetts, where he first worked in a dry goods store alongside his brother Joseph Field. After five years of working in a dry goods store in Pittsfield, Field decided to move west in search of new opportunities, having heard about Chicago's growing commercial prospects from visitors to the store. He moved to Chicago in the spring of 1856, at age 21. He obtained employment at leading dry goods merchant Cooley, Wadsworth & Co., which was to become Cooley, Farwell & Co. in 1857.

== Career ==
Field quickly rose through the ranks of Cooley, Farwell & Co. In 1862, when Cooley left the firm, Field purchased a partnership, and the firm reorganized as Farwell, Field & Co. John V. Farwell appreciated Field's keen business acumen; however, the two men's personalities were very different. Field was efficient and stuffy, while Farwell was more relaxed and cheery.

In January 1865, Field and a partner, Levi Leiter, accepted an offer to become senior partners at the dry goods establishment of Potter Palmer. The new firm became known as "Field, Palmer, Leiter & Co." In 1867, after Field and Leiter could afford to buy him out, Palmer withdrew from the firm, and it was renamed "Field, Leiter & Company." In 1867, Field, Leiter & Company reported revenues of $12 million (equivalent to $227 million in 2025). Like many Chicago businessmen, Field's company was badly affected by the Great Chicago Fire of 1871, but reopened relatively quickly. The company also survived the Panic of 1873 because of relatively low levels of debt. By 1881, Field had forced Leiter to sell his share of the business and changed the store's name to "Marshall Field and Company".

Field took an early 19th-century consumer landscape that was centered around the principle of caveat emptor, or "let the buyer beware", and transformed it into a plush shopping experience fit for the Gilded Age. Unconditional refunds, consistent pricing and international imports are among the Field innovations that became standards in quality retailing. Field's employees were also instructed not to push products on uninterested customers, a common practice in stores of the period. The quotes "Give the lady what she wants" and "The customer is always right" are attributed to Field. (Note: The latter may have been coined by Harry Gordon Selfridge while he was working for Field. The original saying was, "Assume that the customer is right until it is plain beyond all question he is not.")

Though most famous today for his retail business, during his lifetime his wholesale business made far more money. During the 1880s, Field's wholesale business generated five times more revenue than retail annually. The wholesale business even had its own landmark building, the Marshall Field's Wholesale Store, erected in 1887. Revenue from the Marshall Field's retail business did not surpass the company's wholesale business until after Field's death.

Field was highly suspicious of organized labor throughout his career and prohibited unionization among his employees. During the time of the Haymarket Riot, the wives of the defendants initiated an appeal, to which all of the local businessmen agreed except for Field. Journalist and reformer Henry Demarest Lloyd led a national campaign to grant clemency. Even bankers like Lyman J. Gage favored clemency, believing that moderation would lead to improved relations between capital and labor. Potter Palmer and Charles L. Hutchinson were inclined to agree, but Marshall Field was not. A number of other men confided to Gage that they were not willing to publicly disagree with Field, the wealthiest and most powerful businessman in Chicago. Field also opposed organized labor during the 1905 Chicago teamsters' strike.

== Personal life ==
Field avoided political and social intrigue, instead focusing on his work and on supporting his family and his favorite causes. Field was a very active member of the Commercial Club and the Jekyll Island Club, also known as the Millionaires Club, on Jekyll Island, Georgia.

Field married twice. In 1863, he married Nannie Douglas Scott of Ironton, Ohio. They had two sons and a daughter, but one son, Louis, died in 1866 as an infant. The surviving children were Marshall Field Jr. and Ethel Field.

Marshall Field Jr. (1868–1905) married Albertine Huck, and they were the parents of Henry Field, Marshall Field III, and Gwendolyn Mary Field, who married Sir Archibald Charles Edmonstone, 6th Baronet; Marshall Jr. and Albertine were thus the grandparents of Archduchess Elyssa (Edmondstone), Grand Duchess of Tuscany.

On November 22, 1905, at the age of 37, Marshall Jr. incurred a gunshot to the abdomen and died a few days later in hospital. The circumstances of his death are still uncertain, and proposed explanations have included suicide, domestic accident with a gun, and shooting by a prostitute from the Everleigh Club.

Ethel Field was married twice, first to Arthur Magie Tree, with whom she had one son, Ronald Tree; and then in 1901 to David Beatty, 1st Earl Beatty, with whom she had two sons, David Beatty, 2nd Earl Beatty and Peter Beatty.

Nannie died in 1896. In 1904, Field married longtime friend Delia Spencer, the widow of Arthur John Caton. They had no children.

== Death ==
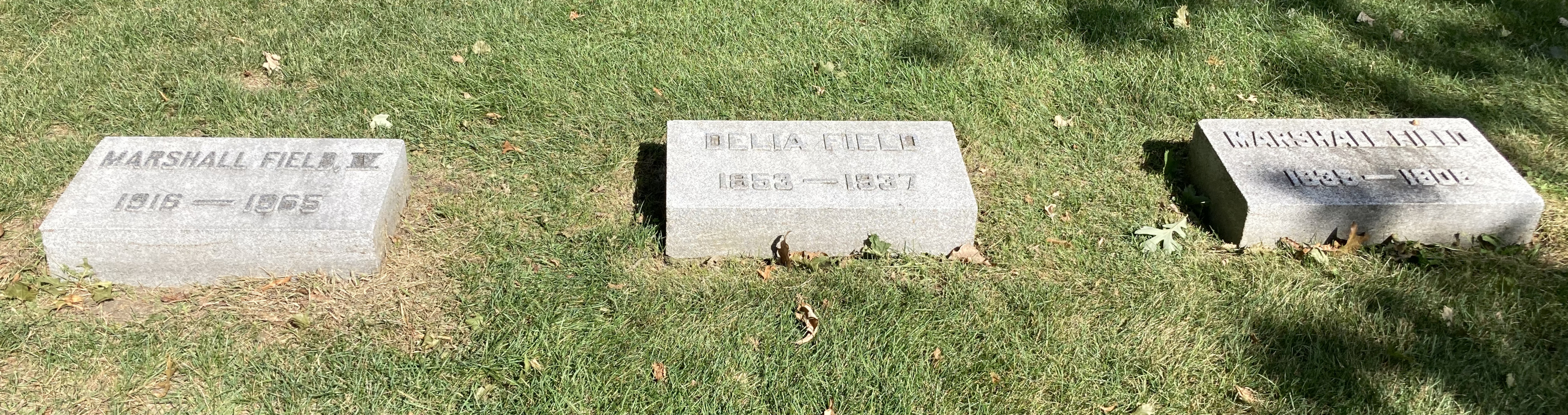
Graves of Marshall Field IV, Delia (Spencer) Field, and Marshall Field at Graceland Cemetery

Field died in New York City, New York, on January 16, 1906, at age 71 of pneumonia contracted after playing golf on New Year's Day with his nephew, his secretary, and Abraham Lincoln's eldest son Robert Todd Lincoln. Field was buried on January 19 in the Graceland Cemetery in Chicago.

== Legacy ==
In 1905, Field's fortune was valued at $125 million (equivalent to $3.47 billion in 2025). His will stated that after various bequests were made, Field's remaining estate was to be held in trust for 40 years for his two grandsons; 60% was to go to Marshall Field III and 40% to Henry Field. Henry Field died in 1917, leaving the Field fortune in the hands of Marshall Field III.

The Field Museum of Natural History was named after Marshall Field in 1894 after he gave it an endowment of $1 million (equivalent to $37.2 million in 2025). He was initially reluctant to make the kind of contribution that the organizers were requesting, reportedly saying, "I don't know anything about a museum and I don't care to know anything about a museum. I'm not going to give you a million dollars." He relented after railroad supplies magnate Edward E. Ayer, another early benefactor (and later the first president) of the museum, convinced Field that his everlasting legacy would be achieved by financing the project. The year after his death the Field Museum received a further $8 million (equivalent to $276 million in 2025) in accordance with his will.

The University of Chicago was co-founded by Field and John D. Rockefeller, to rival nearby Evanston's Northwestern University.

A bust of Marshall Field stands beside those of other early 20th century Chicago industrial magnates on the north riverbank of the Chicago River facing the Merchandise Mart.

Field served on the Sarah Lawrence College board of trustees, where the college's music building carries his name.

The company that Marshall Field founded was absorbed into Macy's a century after his death.

== See also ==
- Marshall Field's, the department store he founded.
- Field Enterprises, a holding company for newspapers and TV stations.
- Henry Field (1841–1890), brother and business partner of Marshall Field
- Marshall Field III (1893–1956), publisher, Chicago Sun founder, investment banker, bankrolled Saul Alinsky
- Marshall Field IV, publisher, owner of the Chicago Sun
- Frederick "Ted" Field, founder of Interscope Communications and co-founder of Interscope Records
