= Willie Yeadon =

British railway historian (1907–1997)

Willie Brayshaw Yeadon
- Born: 28 June 1907; Yeadon, West Riding of Yorkshire
- Died: 16 January 1997 (aged 89); Hull, East Riding of Yorkshire

Willie Brayshaw Yeadon (28 June 1907 – 16 January 1997), was a British railway historian known for his magnum opus, Yeadon's Register of LNER Locomotives and other works.

== Biography ==
Willie Yeadon was born in Yeadon, West Riding of Yorkshire on 28 June 1907. He trained as a mechanical engineer, initially working for the Bradford Dyers' Association Ltd. After being made redundant in the 1930s he joined the Hull firm Fenner in 1931.

Yeadon's initial railway interest was the London & North Western Railway. On moving to East Yorkshire he began to study the activities of the London and North Eastern Railway, starting to collect railway images around 1933. British Rail's 1955 modernisation plan prompted him to begin a systematic study of the locomotives of the LNER, during which he visited engine sheds and works, collecting locomotive related documentation such as works records.

He joined the Railway Correspondence and Travel Society in 1936 and made significant contributions to its multi-volume publication Locomotives of the LNER. In 1984 he was made an honorary life member of the society.

During his career at Fenner he ultimately became marketing manager, before retiring in 1972. After retirement he started work on Yeadon's register of LNER locomotives. Volume 12 and after were published posthumously from his work.

He also published works documenting the locations of LNER locomotives on the first and last day of its existence, and on the railways of Hull. His final work was the two volume A compendium of LNWR locomotives. Yeadon also wrote article for railway periodicals, sometimes using the nom de plume "No. 9499".

Yeadon was married for 64 years to Annie, and had a daughter Jean. He died aged 89 in Hull on 16 January 1997.

== Legacy ==
W.B. Yeadon's will donated his collection of photographs, documents and research notes to the Brynmor Jones Library of the University of Hull; the collection includes over 30,000 photographs, primarily of LNER locomotives and trains, as well as company (works) records of locomotive repairs, boiler repairs, allocations, and other documents. The collection was inherited by the Hull History Centre

=== Bibliography ===
==== Yeadon's Register ====
- Vol. 1: Gresley A1 and A3 Classes (Irwell Press, 1990)
- Vol. 2: Gresley A4 and W1 Classes (Irwell Press, 1990)
- Vol. 3: Raven, Thompson & Peppercorn Pacifics (Irwell Press, 1991)
- Vol. 4. Gresley V2 & V4 Classes (Irwell Press, 1992)
- Vol. 5: Gresley B17 & Thompson B2 Classes (Irwell Press, 1993)
- Vol. 6: Thompson B1 Class (Irwell Press, 1994)
- Vol. 7: B12 class (Irwell Press. 1994)
- Vol. 8: Gresley K3 & K4 Classes (Challenger Publications, 1995)
- Vol. 9: Gresley 8-Coupled Engines - Classes O1, O2, P1, P2 & U1 (Challenger Publications, 1995)
- Vol. 10: Gresley D49 & J38 Classes (Challenger, 1996)
- Vol. 11: Gresley J39 Class (Challenger, 1996)

===== Posthumous =====
- Vol. 12: Railcars & Sentinel Shunters (Challenger, 1996)
- Vol. 13: Class C1, C2, C4 & C5 Atlantics (Challenger, 1998)
- Vol. 14: Class D13, D15 & D16 - the Great Eastern 4-4-0s (Challenger, 1999)
- Vol. 15: Class J94, O6 & O7 - the Engines from the Years of Expediency (Challenger, 1999)
- Vol. 16: Class L1, V1 / V3 - Gresley & Thompson Six-coupled Tanks (Booklaw/Railbus, 2000)
- Vol. 17: Class B13, B14, B15 & B16 - the North Eastern 4-6-0s (Booklaw/Railbus, 2000)
- Vol. 18: Gresley K1 & K2, Thompson K1/1 & Peppercorn K1 (Booklaw/Railbus, 2000)
- Vol. 19: Class D1, D2, D3 & D4, & the M&GN 4-4-0s (Booklaw / Railbus, 2001)
- Vol. 20: Class Q1, Q2, Q3 & Q4, & The Q1 Tank
- Vol. 21: Class A5 to A8, H1, H2, L1 (L3), L2, M1 & M2 Tank Engines (Booklaw/Railbus, 2001)
- Vol. 22: Class B1 (B18) to B9 - the Great Central 4-6-0s (Booklaw/Railbus, 2001)
- Vol. 23: Class Q5, Q6, Q7 & Q10 - the North Eastern 0-8-0s (Booklaw/Railbus, 2002)
- Vol. 24A: Class O4/1 to O4/5 (Booklaw/Railbus, 2002)
- Vol. 24B: Class O4/6 to O4/8, O5 & Thompson O1 (Booklaw/Railbus, 2002)
- Vol. 25: Class N1 & N2 Tank Engines
- Vol. 26: Class J31 to J37 - the NBR 0-6-0s
- Vol. 27: Class N7
- Vol. 28: Class R1, S1, T1 & WM&CQ 0-8-0T - The pre-Group 8-coupled tank engines
- Vol. 29: Class D5, D6, D7, D8, D9, D10, D11/1 & D12 - the Great Central 4-4-0s
- Vol. 30: Class E1, E2, GC 12A, E4, E5, '901', '1440', E7 & E8 - the 2-4-0s
- Vol. 31: Class C6, C7, C8, C9 - the North Eastern Atlantics
- Vol. 32: Class X1, X2, X3, X4, Y2, Y4, Y5, Y6, Y7, Y8, Y9, Y10, Z4 & Z5
- Vol. 33: Class C12, C13, C14 & C17
- Vol. 34: Class D17, D18, D19, D20, D21, D22, D23 & D24
- Vol. 35: Class J14 & J15
- Vol. 36: Class F1, F2, G1, G2, G3, G4, G7, G8, G9 & G10
- Vol. 37A: Class J1, J2, J3 & J4
- Vol. 37B: Class J5, J6, J7, J40 & J41
- Vol. 38: Class F8, G5 & G6
- Vol. 39: Class F3, F4, F5, F6, F7 & F9
- Vol. 40: Class C10, C11, C15, C16 & D11/2
- Vol. 41: Class J16, J17, J18, J19, J20
- Vol. 42A: Class D25, D26, D27, D28, D29 & D30
- Vol. 42B: Class D31, D32, D33, D34, D35 & D36
- Vol. 43A: Class J71 & J72
- Vol. 43B: Class J73-J80 & NER '44'
- Vol. 44: Classes D38, D39, D40, D41, D42, D43, D44, D45, D46, D47 & D48 - The Great North of Scotland Railway 4-4-0s
- Vol. 45: Classes J8. J9, J10, J11, J12, J13 - The Great Central 0-6-0 Tender Engines
- Vol. 46A: Classes J52, J53, J54, J55, J56, J57 & GNR 19 – The Stirling Great Northern 0-6-0 Tank Engines
- Vol. 46B: Classes J50, J51, J84, J93, N19 & M&GN 16A
- Vol. 47A: Classes J21, J22, J23 & J24 - The North Eastern 0-6-0s (Booklaw/Railbus, 2010)
- Vol. 47B: Classes J25, J26, J27, '1001' & '398' - The North Eastern 0-6-0s
- Vol. 48: Classes J64, J65, J66, J67, J68, J69, J70 & J92
- Vol. 49A: Classes N4, N5 & N6
- Vol. 49B: Classes N8, N9, N10, N11, N12, N13, N14 & N15 (Booklaw/Railbus, 2011)
- Vol. 50: Classes D50, D51, GC7, J58, J59, J60, J61, J62, J63, J81, J82, J83, J84, J85, J86, J88, J90, J91, N18, Diesel, Petrol & Electric motive power & Trams (Booklaw/Railbus, 2011)

==== Other LNER ====
- LNER locomotive allocations: 1947: the last day (Irwell Press, 1989)
- LNER locomotive allocations: the First Day, 1923 (Challenger Publications, 1996)

==== LNWR ====
- A compendium of LNWR locomotives
  - Part 1: Passenger Tender Engines 1912–1949
  - Part 2: Goods Tender Engines 1912–1964

==== Hull ====
- Illustrated history of Hull's railways, with M Nicholson (Irwell Press, 1993),
- More Illustrated History of the Railways of Hull (Challenger Publications, 1995).

== See also ==
- Ken Hoole, railway historian, with works on the North Eastern Railway and others
- William Weaver Tomlinson, historian, author of "The North Eastern Railway its rise and development
