= V. Anamika =

Indian painter

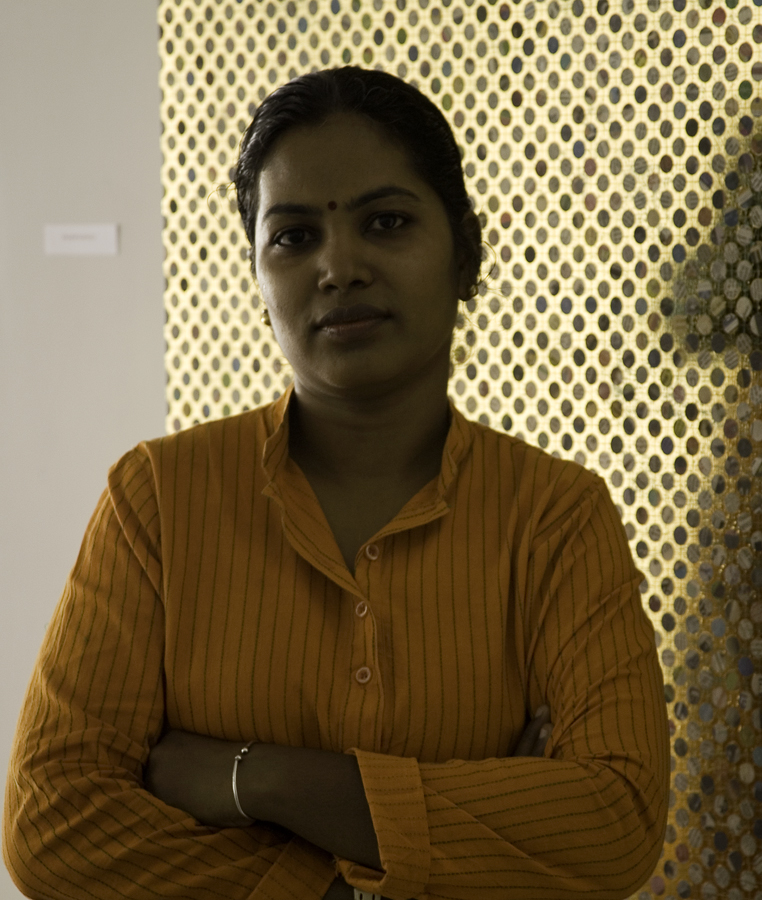
- Born: Anamika; 12 March 1975 (age 51)
- Citizenship: Indian
- Education: Government College of Fine Arts, Chennai, Egmore, Chennai. Master of Fine Arts (Painting and Printmaking)
- Occupation: Contemporary Artist
- Writing career
- Language: Tamil, Hindi, Telugu, English
- Subjects: Painting and Printmaking
- Notable awards: 55th National Lalit Kala Akademi Award; The Charles Wallace India Trust Award; Visiting Artist Award-Edinburgh printmakers studio Lalit Kala Akademi Scholarship for young artist Award for Excellence, Yali Foundation

V. Anamika (born 12 March 1975) is a Contemporary Artist born in Neelankarai, Chennai, Tamil Nadu, a student of S. Dhanapal, an eminent artist of India. She received her master's degree in Fine Arts (Painting and Print Making) in 1999 from Government College of Fine Arts, Chennai. She undertook a course on Care of museum objects at Government Museum in 2005. In 2006, she went to Scotland as a visiting artist scholar to learn Japanese wood-block printing at Edinburgh printmaker's studio.

== Awards ==
She is a recipient of The 55th National exhibition of art Lalit Kala Akademi Award (2014), Audi Ritz icon Award, Chennai (2011), Charles Wallace India Trust Award (2010–11). She earned a visiting scholarship to the UK to learn Enameling art at University of the West of England. She has also received a Visiting Artist Award for printmaking residency(1997) at Edinburgh printmakers studio. Apart from these international accolades, she has received many national and state recognitions including 6th All India Fine Arts Exhibition (1995), Karnataka Chitrakala Parishath - Karnataka, Lalit Kala Akademi Scholarship for Young Artist (2001), All India Fine Arts and Crafts Society Collaborating with Lalit Kala Akademi (1997), Regional Art Exhibition Chitra Kala Samsed (1996), Machilapatnam, Andhra Pradesh, Arrikamedu Art Academy 4th South Zone Level Art Exhibition Committee, Pondicherry(1996) and the Ovia Nunkalai Kuzhu Award (1995, 1997, 1998).

== Exhibitions Participated ==
Invited show

- 2013 - ArtBengaluru, ArtChutney.com Bangalore.
- 2012 - Reginonal Art Exhibition, Lalit Kala Akademi, Chennai.
- 2010 - Silver Anniversary show, Association of British Scholars, Chennai.
- 2010 - ‘The Madras Canvas’, Forum Art Gallery ICC Kuala Lumpur.
- 2010 - "Sangamam Art Festival Confluence" (Chennai Art Initiative), Dakshinchitra, Chennai.

Solo shows

- 2010 - ’, at Focus Art Gallery, Chennai

Group Shows

- 2013 - Madras Musings, Veda Art Gallery, Chennai.
- 2010 - Chennai revisited, The Noble Sage Art Gallery, London.
