= Peter Beatty =

English racehorse owner and breeder (1910–1949)

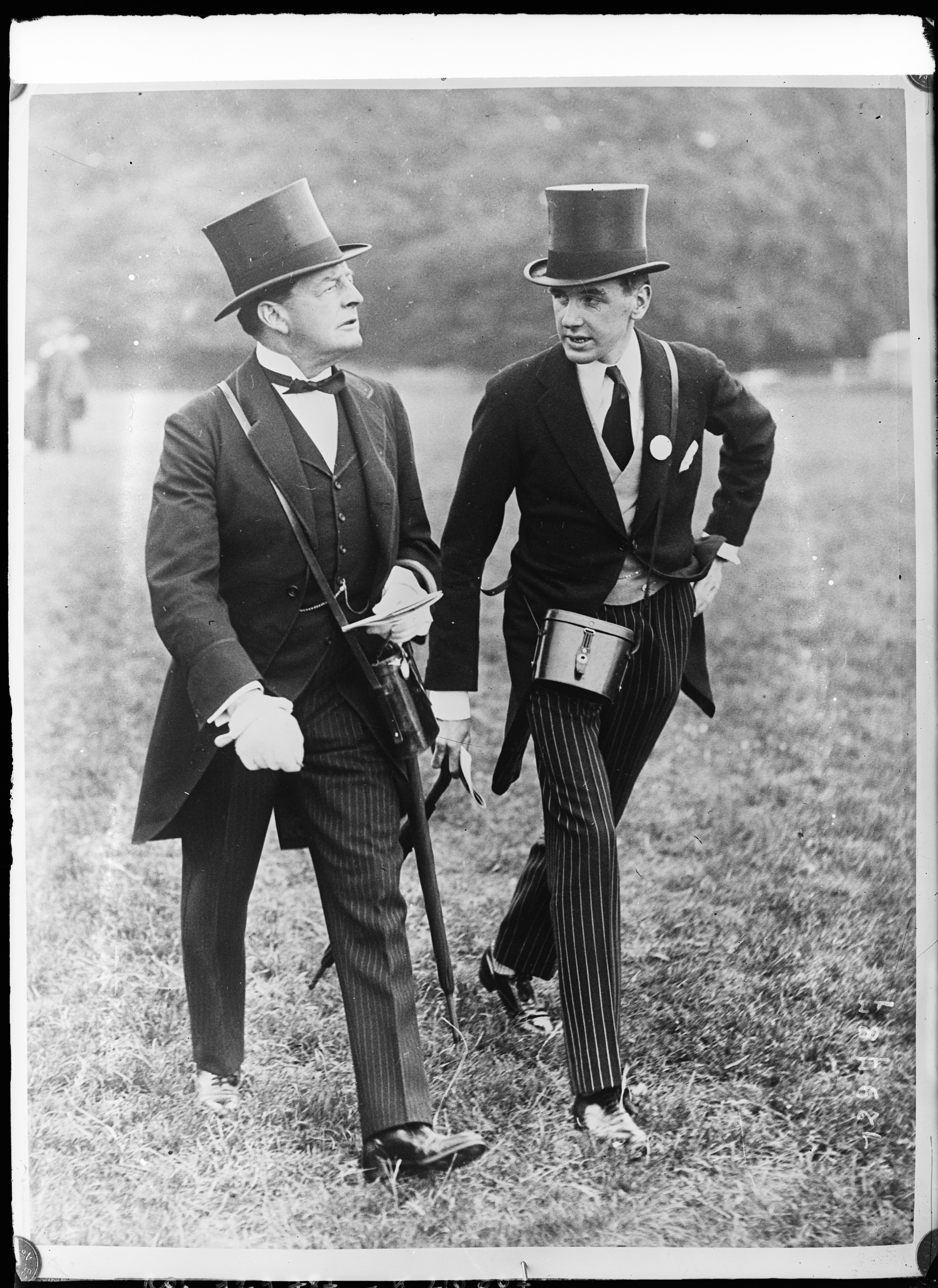
Peter Beatty (right) with his father David in 1928.

Peter Randolph Louis Beatty (2 April 1910 – 26 October 1949) was an English racehorse owner and breeder, businessman and member of the aristocracy.

== Early life and personality ==
Born on 2 April 1910, Beatty was the younger son of David Beatty, 1st Earl Beatty and his wife Ethel. An heiress in her own right, Beatty's mother was the only daughter of Marshall Field, an American millionaire who was involved in the department store business in Chicago. His mother's death in 1932 made Beatty a millionaire. As a baby Beatty suffered from ophthalmia neonatorum. It affected his eyesight and personality throughout his life; he was frequently high-strung, and his eyesight gradually deteriorated. Beatty had consulted eye specialists in the UK and the US and also had many eye surgeries; none were able to offer him any improvement for the condition.

Beatty was described as having a shrewd business sense, particularly when it came to horses and horse racing. He was also said to be witty and at times, mischievous. Despite his failing eyesight, Beatty managed to obtain a commission in his father's old service. He served with the Commando Brigade in the Middle East until he was invalided out. He was a tall, dark and handsome man who had once been named one of Britain's most eligible bachelors. At the time of his death Mereworth Castle in Kent was his main residence. Aly Khan and his wife, Rita Hayworth, were Beatty's guests at the castle for the running of the Epsom Derby in June 1949. (Note: Portions of the 1967 film Casino Royale were filmed at Mereworth Castle.)

== Horse racing ==
Beatty's nickname was "Lucky" because of the success he had enjoyed at an early age in horse racing. He told friends that he had consulted a fortune teller, who told him he would win the Epsom Derby with a horse whose name had three "s" in it; four years later, Beatty's Bois Roussel won the race. In 1936 Beatty inherited Reigate Priory, the last private individual to own the property, and added stables to the grounds for his racehorses. He sold the property to the Mutual Property Life and General Insurance Company in 1942. Beatty was also involved in horse breeding; the noted racehorse My Babu was bred by Beatty.

Beatty had racehorses trained at Beckhampton by Fred Darling. He purchased the racehorse Bois Roussel from Leon Volterra for £8,000, and it went on to win The Derby on 1 June 1938. The horse had been listed as having 20 to 1 odds. The win surprised both Beatty and many others at the racecourse. King George VI, whose horse, Licence, was also entered in the race, invited Beatty to the Royal Box after the win. The Derby victory won Beatty around $50,000. (Note: Beatty donated £500 of his purse to various racing charities; he also won a sizeable sum from the bets he had placed on his horse.) Beatty and Prince Aly Khan were friends and business partners, sharing a love of horses and horse racing. Beatty and Khan were joint owners of Tant Mieux, the 1939 winner of the Gimcrack Stakes.

== Death and legacy ==
Beatty died on 26 October 1949 after falling from a sixth floor window of The Ritz Hotel, London, having been informed that he was going completely blind. At the time of his death, Beatty's eyesight had failed to the point where he needed to be in the company of his valet to walk. He was wearing his pyjamas and a robe when he told his valet he was going to the sixth floor of the Ritz to visit friends there. He then fell six floors to his death at the rear of the hotel. Beatty's most recent eye surgery was on 5 September. His brother, David Beatty, 2nd Earl Beatty, with whom he was living at the time, said that after the surgery Beatty began to lose what little sight he had left, but gave no indication that he intended to kill himself. A coroner's verdict was that Beatty had committed suicide, since he had recently learned that there was no hope of saving his sight.

It upset Beatty greatly that his blindness meant that he could no longer see his racehorses. For a number of years, he needed to have someone describe the races to him when he went to a racetrack. His estate was valued at more than £306,000 in 1950, equivalent to £29.1 million as of 2013. (Note: Comparing the economic status of £306,000 in 1950 with 2013.) Mereworth Castle was left to Michael Lambert Tree, Beatty's nephew. Tree was a son of Ronald Tree, Beatty's half sibling from his mother's first marriage. Ronald Tree's other son, Jeremy Tree, inherited Beatty's bloodstock and became a racehorse trainer himself.
