= Anoma Wijewardene =

Sri Lankan painter

The Right Honourable The Countess Beatty
- Born: Anoma Wijewardene
- Education: Central Saint Martins College, London
- Known for: Quest (2006); Deliverance (2012)
- Spouse(s): David Beatty, 3rd Earl Beatty (m. 1984)
- Father: Ray Wijewardene
- Website: www.anomawijewardene.com

Anoma Wijewardene (Sinhala: අනෝමා විජයවර්ධන) is a Sri Lankan contemporary artist. Wijewardene's paintings and installations reflect themes of sustainability, diversity and peace. She has held exhibitions around the world, including Venice, London, Sydney, Dubai, New Delhi, Hong Kong, Maldives and Colombo.

== Early life ==
Wijewardene is the daughter of Sri Lankan agricultural engineer Ray Wijewardene, who represented Ceylon at the 1968 Summer Olympics in sailing. She has two younger sisters: Roshni and Mandy.

She spent most of her early life in Sri Lanka before attending school in India at age 16. Wijewardene then moved to England, where she graduated in art and design from Central Saint Martins College.

In 1984, Wijewardene married David Beatty, 3rd Earl Beatty.

== Career ==
In 2016, Wijewardene represented Sri Lanka in the exhibition "One Belt, One Road", organised by the gallery Sotheby's Hong Kong. She showcased her work, "Kintsugi", at the European Cultural Centre at the Palazzo Bembo during the 58th Venice Biennale.

In 2019, Wijewardene released the monograph ANOMA at Central Saint Martins, London, on International Women’s Day 2019. The book is a retrospective collection of her life and career in art over the years.

Wijewardene was among four South Asian representatives, including artists from India and Pakistan to participate in an exhibition entitled "In the Fore" in 2009, which was held at The Noble Sage in North London. She contributed eight works on the theme of power.

Wijewardene studied and worked in the UK for thirty years as a designer and artist.

She held solo and group exhibitions in Colombo, London, Kuala Lumpur, Sydney and Singapore. She created solo exhibitions in gallery stores including Wright and Teague in London, The One and Only in Maldives, Stellar Downer Gallery in Sydney, Gallery Taksu in Kuala Lumpur, Art Heritage in New Delhi, and Paradise Road Gallery and Barefoot Gallery in Sri Lanka.

She worked with Sri Lankan poet Ramya Jirasinghe on notable exhibitions such as Deliverance and EarthLines in 2012 and 2016 respectively. Her first major solo exhibition was Quest in 2006, which was a trilingual exhibition that featured a video installation and the use of digital technology as a medium. The primary source material for the exhibition were photographs that were taken in Jaffna, Colombo, along the A9 highway which connects the city of Kandy with Jaffna, and in tsunami-affected areas in the south of Sri Lanka.

Wijewardene worked as a designer for several years in the UK, and her designs were featured on the cover of Vogue. Her clients include Yves St Laurent, Pierre Cardin, Calvin Klein and Ralph Lauren.
