= William Weaver Tomlinson =

- Born: 15 October 1858
- Died: 26 November 1916 (aged 58)

William Weaver Tomlinson (1858–1916) was a historian known for his histories of the north east of England, in particular for his Comprehensive guide to the county of Northumberland. (1888) and his history of the North Eastern Railway: The North Eastern Railway; its rise and development, published 1915.

== Biography ==
William Weaver Tomlinson was born on 15 October 1858. His father was employed by the Hull and Selby Railway and in 1873 William Weaver joined the North Eastern Railway (NER) as an accountant.

He spent many years living at Monkseaton in the north east of England.

The book 'The North Eastern Railway; its rise and development' was published in 1915, having been written between 1900 and 1914 with the backing of the NER. It gives a detailed account of the history of the NER to 1880, and of its predecessor companies; the history from 1880 to 1904 is more briefly covered, partly due to ill health of the author; the key events in period 1904 to 1915 were covered in an appendix. His history of the railway is regarded as an accurate, comprehensive and authoritative history of the company.

He died on 26 November 1916.

== Works ==
- William Weaver Tomlinson (1888). Comprehensive guide to the county of Northumberland. Walter Scott.
- William Weaver Tomlinson (1893). Historical Notes on Cullercoats, Whitley and Monkseaton. W Scott.
- William Weaver Tomlinson, ed. (1895). Songs and ballads of sport and pastime. W. Scott.
- William Weaver Tomlinson (1897). Life in Northumberland during the sixteenth century. Walter Scott.
- William Weaver Tomlinson (1897). The City of Newcastle-Upon-Tyne of To-Day.
- William Weaver Tomlinson (1915). The North Eastern Railway; its rise and development. Andrew Reid and Company, Newcastle; Longmans, Green and Company, London.
  - 'The North Eastern Railway ..' was reprinted in 1967, with a foreword by Ken Hoole.
- William Weaver Tomlinson (1894). Denton Hall and Its Associations...
- George Alexander Cooke; William Weaver Tomlinson. Topographical and Statistical Description of the County of Northumberland.
