= Ken Hoole =

English railway historian

- Born: 1916
- Died: 1988 (aged 71–72); Scarborough, North Yorkshire

Ken Hoole (1916–1988) was an English historian known for his works on the railways of the north east of England.

The Ken Hoole Study Centre at the Darlington Railway Centre and Museum, and the Ken Hoole Trust are named after him.

== Biography ==
Ken Hoole was born in Doncaster in 1916. A railway interest was kindled by daily journeys by train to school in Kingston upon Hull from his home in Bridlington, Yorkshire. He served in radio security during the Second World War. In civilian life his interest led to him becoming a full-time writer on railway history, eventually authoring over 40 books.

He was a founder of the North Eastern Railway Association (NERA), and of the Scarborough Railway Society. Latterly, Hoole lived at Scarborough, North Yorkshire. He died on 27 December 1988.

== Works and legacy ==
Ken Hoole published over forty books as well as numerous magazine articles.

The study centre, The Ken Hoole Study Centre, opened 1992, at the Darlington Railway Centre and Museum (now Head of Steam museum) in Darlington, inheriting its core collection from a bequeathal from Ken Hoole's archive, as well as including the library of the NERA. The Ken Hoole trust, established in his memory, helps fund projects relating to railway history and heritage.

=== Published works ===
In addition to his own works, he also wrote forewords for, corrected and updated reprints of several historic works including William Weaver Tomlinson's North Eastern Railway, G.G. MacTurk's A history of the Hull railways, and George David Parker's The Hull and Barnsley Railway. He also edited the first volume of the two volume The Hull and Barnsley Railway (1972).

- Ken Hoole (1965). A regional history of the railways of Great Britain. Vol 4, The North East (1 ed.). David and Charles., 2nd edition 1974, 3rd edition 1986
- — (1965). The North-Eastern Atlantics. Roundhouse Books.
- — (1965). North East England (1 ed.). David and Charles, Macdonald and Co., 3 editions, 2nd 1968, 3rd 1973
- — (1967). North Road locomotive works, Darlington, 1863–1966. Roundhouse Books.
- — (1969). Railway history in pictures : north-east England. David and Charles.
- — (1969). North Eastern Railway buses, lorries &autocars. Midd Valley Narrow Gauge Railways Ltd.
- — (1969). North Eastern Railway: diagrams of snow ploughs. Nidd Valley Narrow Gauge Railways Ltd for the North Eastern Railway Association. ISBN 095002953X.
- — (1969). North Eastern Railway locomotive stock as at 31.12.20. Nidd Valley Narrow Gauge Railways.
- — (1971). Railways in Cleveland. Dalesman. ISBN 0852061315.
- — (1972). North Eastern locomotive sheds. David and Charles. ISBN 0715353233.
- — (1973). The Stainmore railway. Dalesman. ISBN 0852062028.
- — (1973). Forgotten Railways: North East England. David and Charles. ISBN 0715358944.
- — (1974). North Eastern album. Allan. ISBN 071100563X.
- — (1975). Railways in the Yorkshire Dales. Dalesman. ISBN 0852062931.
- — (1975). The Stockton and Darlington Railway. David and Charles. ISBN 0715367706.
- — (1976). The railways of York. Dalesman. ISBN 0852063377.
- — (1976). Railways in Yorkshire. 2, East Riding. Dalesman. ISBN 0852063563.
- — (1977). Railways in Yorkshire. 3, North Riding. Dalesman. ISBN 0852064187.
- — (1977). The Story of North Road Station Railway Museum, Darlington. North Road Station Railway Museum.
- — (1977). Railways in Yorkshire : a pictorial history. Dalesman.
- — (1977). The East Coast main line since 1925. Ian Allan. ISBN 0711007802.
- — (1978). North Eastern branch lines since 1925. I. Allan. ISBN 0711008299.
- — (1978). North Eastern stations : a photographic recollection. Dalesman. ISBN 0852064640.
- — (1978). Railways in the North Eastern landscape. Branch Line. ISBN 0855270756.
- — (1979). Branch line trains in the North-East : a pictorial survey. Dalesman. ISBN 0852065108.
- — (1979). Branch line trains in the North-East : a pictorial survey. Dalesman. ISBN 0852065108.
- — (1979). The 4-4-0 classes of the North Eastern Railway. I Allan. ISBN 071100921X.
- — (1979). The North East Railway book. David and Charles. ISBN 0715376837.
- — (1981). The Whitby, Redcar and Middlesbrough Union Railway. Nelson. ISBN 0860670651.
- — (1982). Trains in Trouble: Vol. 3. Redruth: Atlantic Books. ISBN 0-906899-05-2.
- — (1983). Trains in Trouble: Vol. 4. Truro: Atlantic Books. ISBN 0-906899-07-9.
- — (1982). Railways of Teesside a pictorial history. Dalesman. ISBN 085206683X.
- — (1983). Railways of Tyneside a pictorial history. Dalesman. ISBN 0852067550.
- — (1983). Railways of the North York Moors : a pictorial history. Dalesman. ISBN 0852067313.
- — (1983). Rail centres, York. Ian Allan. ISBN 0711013209.
- — (1984). North-Eastern branch lines (past and present). Oxford Publishing Company. ISBN 0860931897.
- — (1985). North-eastern branch line termini. Oxford Publishing. ISBN 0860932192.
- — (1985). Railways in the Yorkshire Dales : a pictorial history. Dalesman. ISBN 0852068263.
- — (1985). Railways of East Durham : a pictorial history. Dalesman.
- — (1985). Railway stations of the North East. David and Charles. ISBN 0715385275.
- — (1985). Railway stations of the North East. David and Charles. ISBN 0715385275.
- — (1986). Rail centres : Newcastle. Ian Allan. ISBN 1901945189.
- — (1987). The North Eastern electrics : the history of the Tyneside electric passenger services (1904–1967). Oakwood Press. ISBN 0853613583.
- — (1988). The electric locomotives of the North Eastern Railway. Oakwood Press. ISBN 0853613672.
- — (1988). An illustrated history of North Eastern Railway locomotives. Haynes. ISBN 0860933237.
- — (1993). The Illustrated History of East Coast Joint Stock. ISBN 0860934306.

As co-author

- Cook, R.A.; Hoole, Ken (1975). North Eastern Railway historical maps. Railway and Canal Historical Society. ISBN 0901461105.
- Boddy, M. G.; Brown, W. A.; Fry, E. V.; Hennigan, W.; Hoole, Ken; Manners, F.; Neve, E.; Platt, E. N. T.; Proud, P.; Yeadon, W. B. (March 1975), Fry, E. V. (ed.), Locomotives of the L.N.E.R., Part 2B: Tender Engines—Classes B1 to B19, Lincoln: RCTS, ISBN 0-901115-73-8
- Boddy, M. G.; Brown, W. A.; Fry, E. V.; Hennigan, W.; Hoole, Ken; Manners, F.; Neve, E.; Platt, E. N. T.; Russell, O.; Yeadon, W. B. (November 1979), Fry, E. V. (ed.), Locomotives of the L.N.E.R., Part 3A: Tender Engines—Classes C1 to C11, Kenilworth: RCTS, ISBN 0-901115-45-2
- Fry, E.V.; Hoole, Ken; Manners, F.; Neve, E.; Proud, P.; Yeadon, W.B. (August 1981). Fry, E.V. (ed.). Locomotives of the L.N.E.R., part 3C: Tender Engines – Classes D13 to D24. Kenilworth: RCTS. ISBN 0-901115-52-5.
- Boddy, M. G.; Brown, W. A.; Hennigan, W.; Hoole, Ken; Neve, E.; Yeadon, W. B. (September 1984), Fry, E. V. (ed.), Locomotives of the L.N.E.R., Part 6C: Tender Engines—Classes Q1 to Y10, Kenilworth: RCTS, ISBN 0-901115-55-X
- Boddy, M. G.; Brown, W. A.; Fry, E. V.; Hennigan, W.; Hoole, Ken; Manners, F.; Neve, E.; Platt, E. N. T.; Proud, P.; Yeadon, W. B. (March 1977), Fry, E. V. (ed.), Locomotives of the L.N.E.R., Part 9A: Tank Engines—Classes L1 to N19, Kenilworth: RCTS, ISBN 0-901115-40-1
- Boddy, M. G.; Brown, W. A.; Fry, E. V.; Hennigan, W.; Hoole, Ken; Manners, F.; Neve, E.; Platt, E. N. T.; Proud, P.; Yeadon, W. B. (June 1977), Fry, E. V. (ed.), Locomotives of the L.N.E.R., Part 9B: Tank Engines—Classes Q1 to Z5, Kenilworth: RCTS, ISBN 0-901115-41-X
- Boddy, M.G.; Fry, E.V.; Hennigan, W.; Hoole, Ken; Yeadon, W.B. (November 1988). Fry, E.V. (ed.). Locomotives of the L.N.E.R., part 10A: Departmental Stock, Locomotive Sheds, Boiler and Tender Numbering. Lincoln: RCTS. ISBN 0-901115-65-7.
- Boddy, M.G.; Fry, E.V.; Hennigan, W.; Hoole, Ken; Mallaband, Peter; Neve, E.; Price, J.H.; Proud, P.; Yeadon, W.B. (April 1990), Fry, E.V. (ed.), Locomotives of the L.N.E.R., part 10B: Railcars and Electric Stock, Lincoln: RCTS, ISBN 0-901115-66-5

== See also ==
- Willie Yeadon, railway historian known for accounts of LNER locomotives
