= Rohan Candappa =

British-born-Indian-Canadian writer

Rohan Candappa is a British-born-Sri Lankan-Canadian writer.

== Biography ==
Candappa grew up in London as a second generation immigrant. His father was originally from Ceylon and his mother from Burma.

After 15 years in advertising, Rohan wrote The Little Book of Stress, which sold over 140,000 copies. He has since written a number of other books, including The Curious Incident of the WMD in Iraq, Rules Britannia, and 'Picklehead' and has also written two short films for the BBC. He has sold over 1 million books.

He lives in Crouch End, North London with his wife and two children. He claims to cook excellent food.

Rohan has also performed at the Edinburgh Festival Fringe, the Crouch End Festival (UK's biggest community arts festival), the fringe venue The Intimate Space and performed his writings with improvised jazz musicians at üF-Beat.

After being made redundant in 2015, Rohan turned the experience into his first spoken word show, How I Said 'F**k You' to the Company When They Tried to Make Me Redundant, which he performed at the Edinburgh Festival Fringe in 2016.

In March 2020, during the pandemic, he set up the Lockdown Theatre Company online to support, nurture and pay actors left struggling when the theatres closed. He produced over 20 episodes featuring a wide range of actors.

== Bibliography ==
- Candappa, Rohan (July 1998). The Little Book of Stress. Ebury Press. ISBN 978-0-09-186585-6.
- The Stocking Filler: A Modern Fable For Christmas (1998)
- Candappa, Rohan (April 1999). Little Book Of Wrong Shui. Ebury Press. ISBN 978-0-09-186976-2.
- Candappa, Rohan (August 2001). Autobiography Of A One Year Old. Ebury Press. ISBN 978-0-09-188069-9.
- Stress For Success: The New Mismanagement Revolution (2001)
- Candappa, Rohan (January 2002). Little Book Of The Kama Sutra. Ebury Press. ISBN 978-0-09-188068-2.
- Candappa, Rohan (June 2002). The Parent's Survival Handbook. Ebury Press. ISBN 978-0-09-188528-1.
- Candappa, Rohan (August 2002). Growing Old Disgracefully. Ebury Press. ISBN 978-0-09-188665-3.
- Candappa, Rohan (August 2003). University Challenged. Ebury Press. ISBN 978-0-09-188664-6.
- The Little Book Of Christmas Stress (2003)
- Candappa, Rohan (May 2004). One Hundred Birthday Wishes. Ebury Press. ISBN 978-0-09-189694-2.
- Retox Diet (2004)
- Candappa, Rohan (November 2004). The Curious Incident of the WMD in Iraq. Profile Books. ISBN 978-1-86-197900-1.
- Candappa, Rohan (February 2006). Picklehead. Ebury Press. ISBN 978-0-09-189778-9.
- Candappa, Rohan (October 2007). Rules Britannia. Ebury Press. ISBN 978-0-09-192295-5.
