= Earl Beatty =

Earldom in the Peerage of the United Kingdom

- Arms: Azure, a Beehive, beset with nine Bees volant Or, a Chief Argent, charged with a Cross of St George Gules. Crest: A Demi-Lion Gules, holding in the dexter paw a Crescent Or. Supporters: Dexter: a Sailor of the Royal Navy proper. Sinister: a Soldier of the Royal Marines proper.
- Creation date: 18 October 1919
- Created by: King George V
- Peerage: Peerage of the United Kingdom
- First holder: David Beatty, 1st Earl Beatty
- Present holder: David Beatty, 3rd Earl Beatty
- Heir apparent: Sean Beatty, Viscount Borodale
- Remainder to: 1st Earl's heirs male of the body lawfully begotten
- Subsidiary titles: Viscount Borodale; Baron Beatty
- Status: Extant
- Motto: NON VI SED ARTE; Not by force but by art

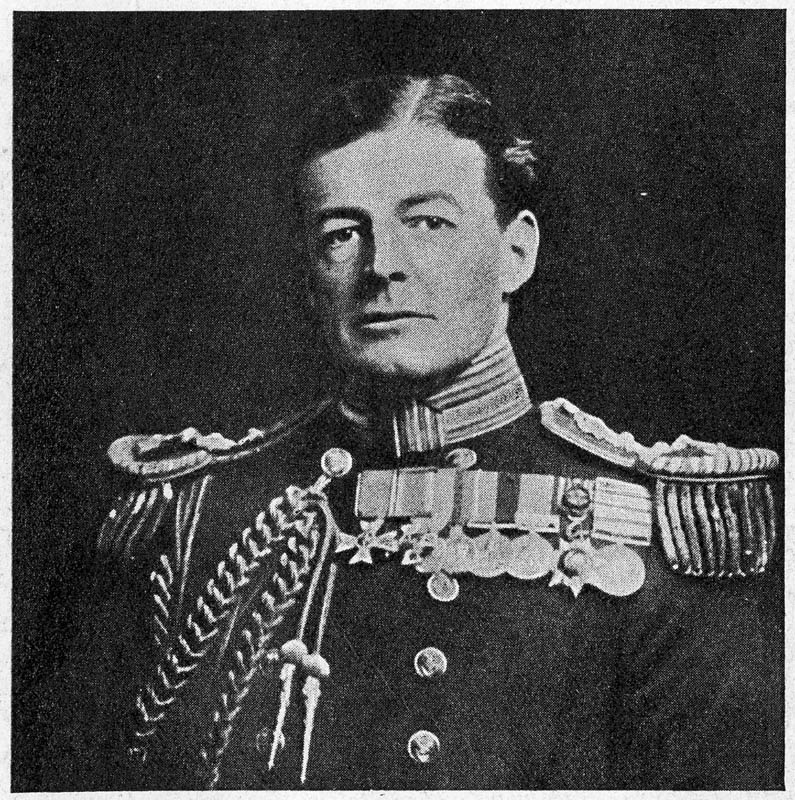
David Beatty, 1st Earl Beatty

Earl Beatty is a title in the Peerage of the United Kingdom. It was created in 1919 for the prominent naval commander Admiral of the Fleet Sir David Beatty. He was created Baron Beatty, of the North Sea and of Brooksby in the County of Leicester, and Viscount Borodale, of Wexford in the County of Wexford, at the same time, also in the Peerage of the United Kingdom. The latter title is used as a courtesy title for the Earl's eldest son and heir apparent. Lord Beatty was succeeded by his eldest son, the second Earl. He represented Peckham in the House of Commons as a Conservative from 1931 to 1936 and briefly served as Under-Secretary of State for Air in Winston Churchill's 1945 caretaker government. As of 2014 the titles are held by his eldest son, the third Earl, who succeeded in 1972.

== Earl Beatty (1919) ==
- David Richard Beatty, 1st Earl Beatty (1871–1936)
- David Field Beatty, 2nd Earl Beatty (1905–1972)
- David Beatty, 3rd Earl Beatty (born 1946)

The heir apparent is the present holder's son, Sean David Beatty, Viscount Borodale (born 1973), who works as a poet and artist, "making scriptive and documentary poems written on location."
The heir apparent's heir apparent is his elder son, the Hon. Orlando Thomas Beatty (born 2003).

== Line of succession ==
- Admiral of the Fleet David Richard Beatty, 1st Earl Beatty (1871–1936)
  - David Field Beatty, 2nd Earl Beatty (1905–1972)
    - David Beatty, 3rd Earl Beatty (born 1946)
      - (1) Sean David Beatty, Viscount Borodale (born 1973)
        - (2) Hon. Orlando Thomas Beatty (born 2003)
        - (3) Hon. Louis David Beatty (born 2007)
      - (4) Hon. Peter Wystan Beatty (born 1975)
    - (5) Hon. Nicholas Duncan Beatty (born 1961)
      - (6) David Brin Charles Beatty (born 1992)
