= Parliamentary constituencies in Leicestershire and Rutland =

The county of Leicestershire in relation to England

The ceremonial county of Leicestershire (which includes the unitary authority of Leicester) is divided into 11 parliamentary constituencies: 3 borough constituencies and 8 county constituencies. One of these is a cross-county boundary constituency with Lincolnshire also including the small historic county of Rutland, which was administratively a district of Leicestershire from 1974 to 1997. Since 1997, Rutland has been a separate unitary authority.

== Constituencies ==
Conservative Labour Liberal Democrat Independent

Name (Note: BC denotes borough constituency, CC denotes county constituency.)	Electorate	Majority (Note: The majority is the number of votes the winning candidate receives more than their nearest rival.)	Member of Parliament	Nearest opposition	Map
Harborough, Oadby and Wigston CC	74,810	2,378	Neil O'Brien	Hajira Piranie	
Hinckley and Bosworth CC	75,683	5,408	Luke Evans	Michael Mullaney	
Leicester East BC	76,465	4,426	Shivani Raja	Rajesh Agrawal	
Leicester South BC	71,007	979	Shockat Adam	Jon Ashworth	
Leicester West BC	72,848	8,777	Liz Kendall	Max Chauhan	
Loughborough CC	73,902	3,960	Jeevun Sandher	Jane Hunt	
Melton and Syston CC	71,615	5,396	Edward Argar	Zafran Khan	
Mid Leicestershire CC	76,173	2,201	Peter Bedford	Robert Martin	
North West Leicestershire CC	75,373	1,012	Amanda Hack	Craig Smith	
Rutland and Stamford CC	70,864	10,394	Alicia Kearns	Joe Wood	
South Leicestershire CC	75,634	5,508	Alberto Costa	Robert Parkinson	

== Historic constituencies ==
In the unreformed House of Commons, Leicestershire and Rutland were represented by two Knights of the Shire each, and the only parliamentary borough was Leicester, which sent two burgesses.

Under the Reform Act 1832, Leicestershire was split into two divisions, North and South, which each elected two members. The Reform Act 1885 redistributed these seats into four single-member divisions: Melton, or Eastern, Loughborough, or Mid, Harborough, or Southern, and Bosworth, or Western.

At the 1918 general election, the four divisions of the county were retained, and the borough of Leicester was split into three single-member constituencies, Leicester East, Leicester South, and Leicester West. From 1950 to 1974 Leicester had four constituencies, these being Leicester North East, Leicester North West, Leicester South East and Leicester South West: the three seat arrangement of South, East and West was reverted to thereafter.

Rutland constituted a constituency on its own until 1918, when it became part of the Rutland and Stamford constituency, with nearby Stamford in Lincolnshire.

In 1983, seats in Leicestershire were redrawn. Rutland was merged with Melton to form Rutland and Melton, with Loughborough, Bosworth, and Harborough remaining as seat names. The new North West Leicestershire constituency was created. A further constituency, Charnwood was created in the north for the 1997 election.

== Boundary Changes ==
=== 2024 ===
See 2023 review of Westminster constituencies for further details.

For the 2023 review of Westminster constituencies, which redrew the constituency map ahead of the 2024 United Kingdom general election, the Boundary Commission for England opted to include Leicestershire and Rutland with Lincolnshire in a sub-region of the East Midlands region, creating one additional seat by re-establishing the constituency of Rutland and Stamford, which spans all three counties. As a consequence, Rutland and Melton is now abolished, being replaced by Melton and Syston, while a reconfigured Charnwood has been renamed Mid Leicestershire. Bosworth is renamed Hinckley and Bosworth and Harborough renamed Harborough, Oadby and Wigston.

	Former name	Boundaries 2010–2024		Current name	Boundaries 2024–Present
1	Bosworth CC		1	Harborough, Oadby and Wigston CC	A map of a large county and an adjacent small county, to the east. The two counties are divided into a total of ten constituencies
2	Charnwood CC		2	Hinckley and Bosworth CC	A map of a large county and an adjacent small county, to the east. The two counties are divided into a total of ten constituencies
3	Harborough CC		3	Leicester East BC	A map of a large county and an adjacent small county, to the east. The two counties are divided into a total of ten constituencies
4	Leicester East BC		4	Leicester South BC	A map of a large county and an adjacent small county, to the east. The two counties are divided into a total of ten constituencies
5	Leicester South BC		5	Leicester West BC	A map of a large county and an adjacent small county, to the east. The two counties are divided into a total of ten constituencies
6	Leicester West BC		6	Loughborough CC	A map of a large county and an adjacent small county, to the east. The two counties are divided into a total of ten constituencies
7	Loughborough CC		7	Melton and Syston CC	A map of a large county and an adjacent small county, to the east. The two counties are divided into a total of ten constituencies
8	North West Leicestershire CC		8	Mid Leicestershire CC	A map of a large county and an adjacent small county, to the east. The two counties are divided into a total of ten constituencies
9	Rutland and Melton CC		9	North West Leicestershire CC	A map of a large county and an adjacent small county, to the east. The two counties are divided into a total of ten constituencies
10	South Leicestershire CC		10	Rutland and Stamford CC	A map of a large county and an adjacent small county, to the east. The two counties are divided into a total of ten constituencies
			11	South Leicestershire CC	A map of a large county and an adjacent small county, to the east. The two counties are divided into a total of ten constituencies

=== 2010 ===
In the Fifth Review the Boundary Commission for England recommended that Leicestershire retained its current constituencies, with minor changes only to reflect revisions to local authority ward boundaries. Although virtually unchanged, Blaby was renamed South Leicestershire on the grounds that it does not match the borders of Blaby district, and the village of Blaby itself is not one of the major population centres.

	Name	Boundaries 1997–2010	Boundaries 2010–2024
1	Bosworth CC	A map of a large county and an adjacent small county, to the east. The two counties are divided into a total of ten constituencies	A map of the same two counties. The borders of the constituencies are slightly different. The border between the two counties remains unchanged.
2	Charnwood CC	A map of a large county and an adjacent small county, to the east. The two counties are divided into a total of ten constituencies	A map of the same two counties. The borders of the constituencies are slightly different. The border between the two counties remains unchanged.
3	Harborough CC	A map of a large county and an adjacent small county, to the east. The two counties are divided into a total of ten constituencies	A map of the same two counties. The borders of the constituencies are slightly different. The border between the two counties remains unchanged.
4	Leicester East BC	A map of a large county and an adjacent small county, to the east. The two counties are divided into a total of ten constituencies	A map of the same two counties. The borders of the constituencies are slightly different. The border between the two counties remains unchanged.
5	Leicester South BC	A map of a large county and an adjacent small county, to the east. The two counties are divided into a total of ten constituencies	A map of the same two counties. The borders of the constituencies are slightly different. The border between the two counties remains unchanged.
6	Leicester West BC	A map of a large county and an adjacent small county, to the east. The two counties are divided into a total of ten constituencies	A map of the same two counties. The borders of the constituencies are slightly different. The border between the two counties remains unchanged.
7	Loughborough CC	A map of a large county and an adjacent small county, to the east. The two counties are divided into a total of ten constituencies	A map of the same two counties. The borders of the constituencies are slightly different. The border between the two counties remains unchanged.
8	North West Leicestershire CC	A map of a large county and an adjacent small county, to the east. The two counties are divided into a total of ten constituencies	A map of the same two counties. The borders of the constituencies are slightly different. The border between the two counties remains unchanged.
9	Rutland and Melton CC	A map of a large county and an adjacent small county, to the east. The two counties are divided into a total of ten constituencies	A map of the same two counties. The borders of the constituencies are slightly different. The border between the two counties remains unchanged.
10	South Leicestershire CC (previously Blaby CC)	A map of a large county and an adjacent small county, to the east. The two counties are divided into a total of ten constituencies	A map of the same two counties. The borders of the constituencies are slightly different. The border between the two counties remains unchanged.

== Results history ==
Primary data source: House of Commons research briefing - General election results from 1918 to 2019

=== 2024 ===
The number of votes cast for each political party who fielded candidates in constituencies comprising Leicestershire and Rutland in the 2024 general election were as follows:

Party	Votes	%	Change from 2019	Seats	Change from 2019
Conservative	173,711	34.2%	▼19.1%	7	0
Labour	142,114	28.0%	▼4.1%	3	0
Reform UK	77,889	15.3%	▲14.5%	0	0
Liberal Democrats	49,343	9.7%	▼0.1%	0	0
Greens	34,014	6.7%	▲6.7%	0	0
Others	30,875	6.1%	▲5.6%	1	▲1
Total	507,946	100.0		11	

=== Percentage votes ===
Election year	1983	1987	1992	1997	2001	2005	2010	2015	2017	2019	2024
Conservative	50.6	52.0	48.7	36.8	38.1	37.4	41.0	43.9	48.9	53.3	34.2
Labour	25.3	27.3	33.0	43.8	41.5	36.1	27.6	30.6	40.1	32.1	28.0
Liberal Democrat^{1}	22.7	20.2	17.1	15.1	17.0	20.8	23.3	8.0	6.6	9.8	9.7
Green Party	-	*	*	*	*	*	0.4	2.7	2.1	3.5	6.7
UKIP	-	-	-	*	*	*	2.6	14.4	1.8	*	-
Reform UK^{2}	-	-	-	-	-	-	-	-	-	0.8	15.3
Other	1.4	0.5	1.2	4.3	3.4	5.8	5.1	0.4	0.5	0.5	6.1

^{1}1983 & 1987 - SDP–Liberal Alliance

^{2} 2019- Brexit Party

* Included in Other

=== Seats ===
Election year	1983	1987	1992	1997	2001	2005	2010	2015	2017	2019	2024
Conservative	8	6	6	5	5	5	7	7	7	7	7
Labour	1	3	3	5	5	5	3	3	3	3	3
Independent	0	0	0	0	0	0	0	0	0	0	1
Total	9	9	9	10	10	10	10	10	10	10	11

^{1}1983 & 1987 - SDP–Liberal Alliance

=== Maps ===
==== 1885-1910 ====
1885

1886

1892

1895

1900

1906

Jan 1910

Dec 1910

==== 1918-1945 ====
1918

1922

1923

1924

1929

1931

1935

1945

==== 1950-1979 ====
1950

1951

1955

1959

1964

1966

1970

Feb 1974

Oct 1974

1979

==== 1983-present ====
1983

1987

1992

1997

2001

2005

2010

2015

2017

2019

2024

== Historical representation by party ==
A cell marked → (with a different colour background to the preceding cell) indicates that the previous MP continued to sit under a new party name.

=== 1885 to 1918 ===
Conservative Labour Liberal Liberal-Labour

Constituency	1885	1886	88	91	1892	94	1895	1900	04	1906	06	07	Jan 1910	Dec 1910	13	16
Bosworth	Ellis				C. McLaren									H. McLaren		
Harborough	Paget	Tapling		Logan					Stanhope	Lehmann				Logan		Harris
Leicester	McArthur				Whitehead	Broadhurst					Thomasson		Crawshay-Williams		Hewart	
Leicester	Picton					Hazell		Rolleston		MacDonald						
Loughborough	Johnson-Ferguson	de Lisle			Johnson-Ferguson			Levy								
Melton	J. Manners		H. Manners				E. Manners	C. Manners		Walker				Yate		
Rutland	Finch											Gretton				

=== 1918 to 1950 ===
From 1918 to 1983 Rutland was categorised with Lincolnshire.

Coalition Liberal (1918-22) / National Liberal (1922-23) Coalition National Democratic & Labour Conservative Labour Liberal National Labour National Liberal (1931-68)

Constituency	1918	22	1922	1923	1924	27	1929	31	1931	33	1935	1945
Bosworth	McLaren		Paget	Ward	Gee	Edge		→				Allen
Harborough	Fraser			Black	Winby		Stuart			Tree		Attewell
Leicester East	Hewart	Banton	Evans	Banton	Loder		Wise		Lyons			Donovan
Leicester South	Blane		Reynolds	Allen	Waterhouse							Bowden
Leicester West	Green		Hill	Pethick-Lawrence					Pickering		Nicolson	B. Janner
Loughborough	Guest		Spears		Rye		Winterton		Kimball			Follick
Melton	Yate				Everard							Nutting

=== 1950 to 1983 ===
From 1918 to 1983 Rutland was categorised with Lincolnshire.

Conservative Labour Social Democratic

Constituency	1950	50	1951	1955	56	57	1959	62	1964	1966	67	1970	Feb 1974	Oct 1974	1979	81
Bosworth	Allen						Wyatt					Butler				
Harborough	Baldock						Farr									
Leicester NE / Leicester E (1974)	Donovan	Ungoed-Thomas						Bradley								→
Leicester SW / Leicester S (1974)	Bowden										Boardman			Marshall		
Leicester NW / Leicester W (1974)	B. Janner											G. Janner				
Leicester South East	Waterhouse					Peel										
Loughborough	Follick			Cronin											Dorrell	
Melton	Nutting				Pike								Latham			
Blaby													Lawson			

=== 1983 to present ===
Conservative Independent Labour Liberal Democrats Reclaim

Constituency	1983	1987	1992	1997	2001	04	2005	2010	11	2015	2017	2019	20	23	23	23	2024
Blaby / South Leics (2010)	Lawson		Robathan							Costa							
Bosworth / Hinckley & Bosworth (2024)	Butler	Tredinnick										Evans					
Harborough / H., Oadby & Wigston ('24)	Farr		Garnier								O'Brien						
Leicester East	Bruinvels	Vaz										Webbe	→				Raja
Leicester South	Spencer	Marshall				Gill	Soulsby		Ashworth								Adam
Leicester West	G. Janner			Hewitt				Kendall									
Loughborough	Dorrell			Reed				Morgan				Hunt					Sandher
Rutland & Melton / R. & Stamford ('24)^{1}	Latham		Duncan									Kearns					
North West Leicestershire	Ashby			Taylor				Bridgen						→	→	→	Hack
Charnwood / Mid Leicestershire (2024)				Dorrell						Argar							Bedford
Melton and Syston																	Argar

^{1}includes parts of Lincolnshire

== See also ==
- List of parliamentary constituencies in the East Midlands (region)
- East Midlands (European Parliament constituency)
- Leicestershire County Council
- Rutland County Council
