= Parliamentary constituencies in the East Midlands =

The region of East Midlands is divided into 47 parliamentary constituencies which is made up of 12 borough constituencies and 35 county constituencies. Since the 2024 United Kingdom general election, 29 are represented by Labour MPs, 14 by Conservative MPs, 3 by Reform UK MPs and 1 by an independent MP.

== Constituencies ==
Parliamentary constituencies in the East Midlands with 2024 results
Constituency (Note: BC denotes borough constituency, CC denotes county constituency.)	Electorate	Majority (Note: The majority is the number of votes the winning candidate receives more than their nearest rival.)	Member of Parliament	Nearest opposition	County	Constituency map
Amber Valley CC	71,546	3,554	Linsey Farnsworth (Labour)	Alex Stevenson (Reform UK)	Derbyshire	
Ashfield CC	68,929	5,509	Lee Anderson (Reform UK)	Rhea Keehn (Labour)	Nottinghamshire	
Bassetlaw CC	78,173	5,768	Jo White (Labour)	Brendan Clarke-Smith (Conservative)	Nottinghamshire	
Bolsover CC	77,334	6,323	Natalie Fleet (Labour)	Mark Fletcher (Conservative)	Derbyshire	
Boston and Skegness CC	75,811	2,010	Richard Tice (Reform UK)	Matt Warman (Conservative)	Lincolnshire	
Broxtowe CC	71,923	8,403	Juliet Campbell (Labour)	Darren Henry (Conservative)	Nottinghamshire	
Chesterfield BC	71,654	10,820	Toby Perkins (Labour)	Ben Flook (Conservative)	Derbyshire	
Corby and East Northamptonshire CC	78,787	6,331	Lee Barron (Labour)	Tom Pursglove (Conservative)	Northamptonshire	
Daventry CC	80,879	3,012	Stuart Andrew (Conservative)	Marianne Kimani (Labour)	Northamptonshire	
Derby North BC	71,900	8,915	Catherine Atkinson (Labour)	Amanda Solloway (Conservative)	Derbyshire	
Derby South BC	72,952	6,002	Baggy Shanker (Labour)	Alan Graves (Reform UK)	Derbyshire	
Derbyshire Dales CC	73,317	350	John Whitby (Labour)	Sarah Dines (Conservative)	Derbyshire	
Erewash CC	71,497	5,859	Adam Thompson (Labour)	Maggie Throup (Conservative)	Derbyshire	
Gainsborough CC	75,836	3,532	Sir Edward Leigh (Conservative)	Jess Mcguire (Labour)	Lincolnshire	
Gedling CC	77,006	11,881	Michael Payne (Labour)	Tom Randall (Conservative)	Nottinghamshire	
Grantham and Bourne CC	73,280	4,496	Gareth Davies (Conservative)	Vipul Bechar (Labour)	Lincolnshire	
Harborough, Oadby and Wigston CC	77,407	2,378	Neil O'Brien (Conservative)	Hajira Piranie (Labour)	Leicestershire	
High Peak CC	74,385	7,908	Jon Pearce (Labour)	Robert Largan (Conservative)	Derbyshire	
Hinckley and Bosworth CC	76,431	5,408	Luke Evans (Conservative)	Michael Mullaney (Liberal Democrats)	Leicestershire	
Kettering CC	79,390	3,820	Rosie Wrighting (Labour)	Philip Hollobone (Conservative)	Northamptonshire	
Leicester East BC	76,560	4,426	Shivani Raja (Conservative)	Rajesh Agrawal (Labour)	Leicestershire	
Leicester South BC	70,867	979	Shockat Adam (independent)	Jonathan Ashworth (Labour)	Leicestershire	
Leicester West BC	74,102	8,777	Liz Kendall (Labour)	Max Chauhan (Conservative)	Leicestershire	
Lincoln BC	72,313	8,793	Hamish Falconer (Labour)	Karl McCartney (Conservative)	Lincolnshire	
Loughborough CC	68,996	4,960	Jeevun Sandher (Labour)	Jane Hunt (Conservative)	Leicestershire	
Louth and Horncastle CC	76,882	5,506	Victoria Atkins (Conservative)	Sean Matthews (Reform UK)	Lincolnshire	
Mansfield CC	73,817	3,485	Steve Yemm (Labour)	Ben Bradley (Conservative)	Nottinghamshire	
Melton and Syston CC	74,316	5,396	Edward Argar (Conservative)	Zafran Khan (Labour)	Leicestershire	
Mid Derbyshire CC	69,281	1,878	Jonathan Davies (Labour)	Luke Gardiner (Conservative)	Derbyshire	
Mid Leicestershire CC	75,933	2,201	Peter Bedford (Conservative)	Robert Martin (Labour)	Leicestershire	
Newark CC	80,028	3,572	Robert Jenrick (Reform UK) (Note: Jenrick defected from the Conservatives in January 2026 immediately after losing the whip.)	Saj Ahmad (Labour)	Nottinghamshire	
North East Derbyshire CC	73,139	1,753	Louise Sandher-Jones (Labour)	Lee Rowley (Conservative)	Derbyshire	
North West Leicestershire CC	77,757	1,012	Amanda Hack (Labour)	Craig Smith (Conservative)	Leicestershire	
Northampton North BC	75,575	9,014	Lucy Rigby (Labour)	Dan Bennett (Conservative)	Northamptonshire	
Northampton South BC	70,393	4,071	Mike Reader (Labour)	Andrew Lewer (Conservative)	Northamptonshire	
Nottingham East BC	69,395	15,162	Nadia Whittome (Labour)	Rosey Palmer (Green)	Nottinghamshire	
Nottingham North and Kimberley BC	73,768	9,427	Alex Norris (Labour)	Golam Kadiri (Reform UK)	Nottinghamshire	
Nottingham South BC	64,255	12,568	Lilian Greenwood (Labour)	Zarmeena Quraishi (Conservative)	Nottinghamshire	
Rushcliffe CC	79,160	7,426	James Naish (Labour)	Ruth Edwards (Conservative)	Nottinghamshire	
Rutland and Stamford CC	71,711	10,394	Alicia Kearns (Conservative)	Joe Wood (Labour)	Leicestershire, Lincolnshire and Rutland	
Sherwood Forest CC	78,894	5,443	Michelle Welsh (Labour)	Mark Spencer (Conservative)	Nottinghamshire	
Sleaford and North Hykeham CC	75,807	4,346	Dr Caroline Johnson (Conservative)	Hanif Khan (Labour)	Lincolnshire	
South Derbyshire CC	73,714	4,168	Samantha Niblett (Labour)	Heather Wheeler (Conservative)	Derbyshire	
South Holland and The Deepings CC	78,473	6,856	John Hayes (Conservative)	Matthew Swainson (Reform UK)	Lincolnshire	
South Leicestershire CC	78,543	5,508	Alberto Costa (Conservative)	Robert Parkinson (Labour)	Leicestershire	
South Northamptonshire CC	78,233	3,687	Sarah Bool (Conservative)	Rufia Ashraf (Labour)	Northamptonshire	
Wellingborough and Rushden CC	77,559	5,486	Gen Kitchen (Labour)	David Goss (Conservative)	Northamptonshire	

== 2024 results ==
The number of votes cast for each political party who fielded candidates in constituencies comprising the East Midlands region in the 2024 general election were as follows:

Party	Votes	%	Change from 2019	Seats	Change from 2019 (actual)	Change from 2019 (notional)
Labour	753,723	35.3	▲3.5	29	▲21	▲21
Conservative	626,568	29.4	▼25.5	15	▼23	▼24
Reform UK	403,470	18.9	▲17.4	2	▲2	▲2
Liberal Democrats	136,929	6.4	▼1.4	0	0	0
Green	133,447	6.3	▲3.8	0	0	0
Others	79,524	3.7	▲2.1	1	▲1	▲1
Total	2,133,661	100.0		47	▲1	

== Results history ==
Primary data source: House of Commons research briefing - General election results from 1918 to 2019 (2024 as above)

=== Percentage votes ===
East Midlands votes %

Key:

- CON - Conservative Party, including National Liberal Party up to 1966
- LAB - Labour Party, including Labour and Co-operative Party
- LIB - Liberal Party up to 1979; SDP-Liberal Alliance 1983 & 1987; Liberal Democrats from 1992
- UKIP - UK Independence Party 2010 to 2017 (included in Other up to 2005 and from 2019)
- REF - Reform UK (Brexit Party in 2019)
- GRN - Green Party of England and Wales (included in Other up to 2005)

=== Seats ===
East Midlands seats

Key:

- CON - Conservative Party, including National Liberal Party up to 1966
- LAB - Labour Party, including Labour and Co-operative Party
- LIB - Liberal Party up to 1979; SDP-Liberal Alliance 1983 & 1987; Liberal Democrats from 1992
- REF - Reform UK
- OTH - 1945 - Independent (Denis Kendall); 1974 (Feb) - Democratic Labour (Dick Taverne); 2024 - Independent (Shockat Adam)

=== Maps ===
2024

== See also ==
- Constituencies of the Parliament of the United Kingdom
- Parliamentary constituencies in Derbyshire
- Parliamentary constituencies in Leicestershire and Rutland
- Parliamentary constituencies in Lincolnshire
- Parliamentary constituencies in Northamptonshire
- Parliamentary constituencies in Nottinghamshire
