= Kelmarsh Hall =

Country house in Northamptonshire, England

Coordinates: 52°24′34″N 0°55′08″W

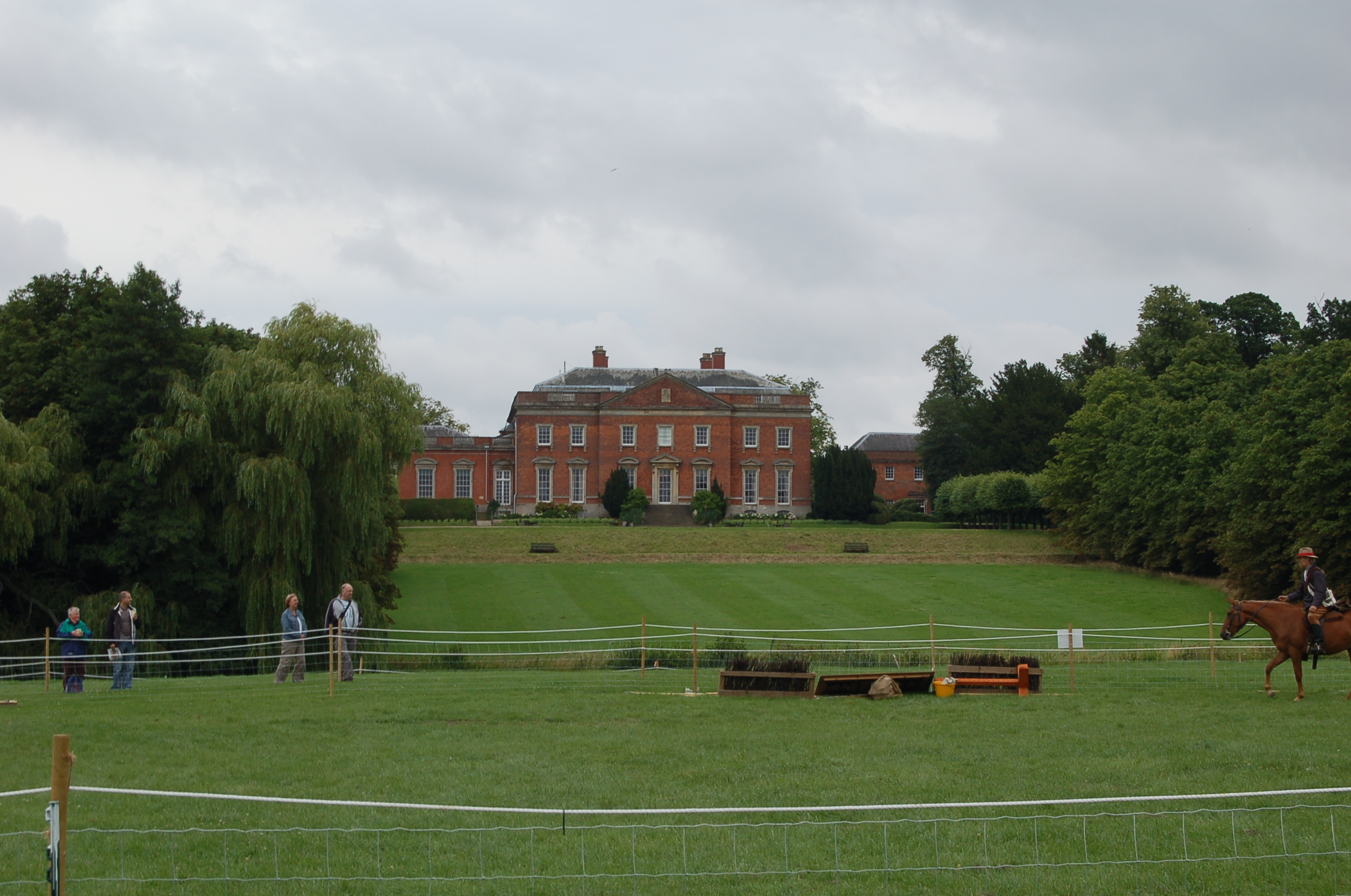
Kelmarsh Hall

Kelmarsh Hall in Northamptonshire, England, is an 18th-century country house about 5 miles (8.0 km) south of Market Harborough and 11 miles (18 km) north of Northampton. It is a Grade I listed house and is open to public viewing.

The present Palladian hall was built in 1732 for William Hanbury, Esq (1704-1768), a famous antiquarian, by Francis Smith of Warwick, to a James Gibbs design; the hall is still today surrounded by its working estate, and comprises both parkland and gardens. Pevsner described the building as, “a perfect, extremely reticent design… done in an impeccable taste."

In building the hall, Hanbury was utilising a fortune which had been bolstered by an advantageous marriage to a niece of Viscount Bateman; he went on to acquire the Shobdon Court estate in Herefordshire and one of his grandchildren, William Hanbury III, succeeded to a Bateman baronetcy.

Richard Christopher Naylor, a Liverpool banker, cotton trader and horse racing enthusiast, purchased the estate in 1864, mainly for its hunting potential. In 1902, George Granville Lancaster bought the estate; his son, Claude, inherited on his majority in 1924, and it later passed to Claude's elder sister Cicely in 1977; she later established the Kelmarsh Trust to safeguard the estate's future after her death in 1996.

Ronald Tree and his wife Nancy, née Perkins (later known as Nancy Lancaster) took a 6-year repairing lease on the Hall in 1929. Tree became the Member of Parliament for Harborough in 1933. His wife, who became renowned for her work and taste in interior design, subsequently married the owner of the estate, Claude Lancaster.

In 2019 the estate was host to the multi day long Shambala festival.

Series four an five (broadcast in 2025 and 2026 respectively) of the BBC Television series Extraordinary Portraits were filmed at Kelmarsh.
