= 1933 Harborough by-election =

UK Parliamentary by-election

The 1933 Harborough by-election was held on 28 November 1933. The by-election was held due to the resignation of the incumbent Conservative MP, Arthur Stuart. It was won by the Conservative candidate Arthur Tree.

Harborough by-election, 1933
Party	Candidate	Votes	%	±%
Conservative	Ronald Tree	19,320	50.9	−23.6
Labour	William Bennett	12,460	32.8	+7.3
Liberal	W Carey Wilson	6,144	16.3	New
Majority		6,860	18.1	−30.8
Turnout		37,924		
Conservative hold		Swing		
