= Arthur Stuart, 7th Earl Castle Stewart =

British politician (1889–1961)

Arthur Stuart, 7th Earl Castle Stewart, MC (6 August 1889 – 5 November 1961), styled Viscount Stuart from 1915 to 1921, was an Anglo-Irish peer and Unionist politician.

== Background and education ==
Stuart was the third son of Andrew John Stuart, 6th Earl Castle Stewart, an Ulster Scots nobleman, and his wife, Emma Georgiana Diana, the youngest daughter of Major-General Arthur Stevens (1821–1895) of the Madras Native Infantry and his second wife (of five), Georgiana Eliza Dickson, a descendant of John Sheffield, 1st Duke of Buckingham and Normanby. The Stuart family descends in the male line from King Robert II of Scotland.

He was educated at Charterhouse, Trinity College, Cambridge and the University of Paris.

== Military and political career ==
Stuart fought in the First World War as a Major in the Machine Gun Corps, was mentioned in despatches and was awarded the Military Cross in the 1918 Birthday Honours. His two elder brothers were both killed in the First World War and in 1921, he succeeded his father as seventh Earl Castle Stewart. However, as this was an Irish peerage it did not entitle him to a seat in the House of Lords. He was elected to the House of Commons for Harborough in 1929 as a Conservative and Unionist, a seat he held until 1933.

== Family ==
On 16 December 1920 Stuart married Eleanor May, daughter of Solomon Guggenheim and Irene M. Rothschild, and they had four sons:

- David Andrew Noel Stuart, Viscount Stuart (1921−1942), killed in action during the Second World War
- Robert John Ochiltree Stuart, Viscount Stuart (1923−1944), killed in action during the Second World War
- Arthur Patrick Avondale Stuart, 8th Earl Castle Stewart (1928−2023)
- Simon Walter Erskine Stuart (1930−2002), father of the food writer Tristram Stuart

Stuart committed suicide with a shotgun in his study at Old Lodge, his house and estate at Ashdown Forest near Uckfield, on 5 November 1961. Following the death of his widow in 1992, Old Lodge was sold to a member of the Saudi royal family.

== Sources ==
- Kidd, Charles, Williamson, David (editors). Debrett's Peerage and Baronetage (1990 edition). New York: St Martin's Press, 1990.

Parliament of the United Kingdom
Preceded by Lewis Winby	Member of Parliament for Harborough; 1929 – 1933	Succeeded by Ronald Tree
Peerage of Ireland
Preceded by Andrew John Stuart	Earl Castle Stewart; 1921–1961	Succeeded by Arthur Patrick Avondale Stuart
