= John Wycliffe Black =

John Wycliffe Black (21 July 1862 – 18 June 1951) was an English shoe manufacturer and Liberal Party politician.

== Family and education ==
John Wycliffe Black was born in London, the son of Robert Black, a successful Knightsbridge draper He was sent to Bishop's Stortford College in Hertfordshire for his schooling. In 1890 he married Eunice Marsden from Wigan in Lancashire and they had one son and a daughter. Their son Arthur Norman Black (1894–1973) was a celebrated motor cycle and racing car driver of the 1930s and 1940s. Adventurous activity runs in the Black family, John Wycliffe Black's nephew Tom Campbell Black (1899–1936), was a pioneer aviator.

== Religion ==
Black was a staunch churchman and temperance supporter. He was Chairman of the Evangelistic Committee of Churches of Christ and in 1935 was President of the World Convention of Churches of Christ.

== Career and politics ==
Black was in manufacturing and for some time too ran an estate agency in Kensington with his brother, Robert Wilson Black. It was clear he was, at least for a time, quite a wealthy man. When he was Chairman of the Harborough Divisional Liberal Association in 1919, he was engaged in correspondence with Sir Percy Harris who had been the Liberal MP for Harborough between 1916 and 1918. The dispute centred on the amount of money Harris was expected to contribute if he wished to remain as Parliamentary candidate. In the end Harris was not able to meet the requirements of the Liberal Association and moved to another constituency. The need then arose for Harborough Liberals to select another candidate and Black was adopted. One of the chief reasons for Black's adoption was his ability to finance the local party from his own resources. Once Black ceased to provide funds for the Association in the mid-1920s, they had to stop paying the salary of the full-time official they engaged and by March 1927 they were unable even to afford their affiliation fee to the Midland Liberal Federation.

Black was an elected member of Leicestershire County Council before being made an Alderman. He remained an Alderman of the county until his death in 1951 by which time he had acquired the courtesy title of ‘father of the council’. He stood for election to Parliament in Harborough three times. First in the 1922 general election when he came second in a three-cornered contest to the sitting Conservative MP, Sir Keith Fraser, with Labour in third place. At the 1923 general election, Black again faced Fraser but this time in a straight fight and he took the seat with a majority of 1,304 votes. For the 1924 general election however, Labour re-entered the fray and as the Liberals suffered a national decline, the Conservatives regained the seat and Labour took second place, relegating Black to the foot of the poll.

Black also served as a Justice of the Peace for Leicestershire.

== Health politics ==
Black took an interest in various health related political issues. He was a member of the Council of the National Institute for the Blind, representing the County Councils Association and later served on the Advisory Committee on the Welfare of the Blind, which reported to the Minister of Health. He also took an interest in issues relating to Mental Health. He was sometime chairman of the Mental Hospital Association and served on a Ministry of Health committee to inquire into scientific and ancillary mental health services.

== Death ==
Black died at his home, The Rowans, 88 Holmfield Road, Leicester on 18 June 1951, aged 88 years.

Parliament of the United Kingdom
Preceded by Sir Keith Alexander Fraser	Member of Parliament for Harborough; 1923 – 1924	Succeeded by Lewis Winby
