= China Research Group =

Defunct conservative UK foreign policy grouping

- Abbreviation: ERG
- Formation: April 2020; 6 years ago
- Founder: Tom Tugendhat; Neil O'Brien
- Dissolved: September 9, 2025; 13 months ago
- Purpose: Support research in regards to UK's relations with China

The China Research Group (CRG) was a research support in the United Kingdom group focusing on UK's relationship with China. It was co-founded in April 2020 by then-Conservative members of parliament Tom Tugendhat and Neil O'Brien. It was dissolved in September 2025.

== History ==
In April 2020, Tom Tugendhat and Neil O'Brien founded the China Research Group, modelled on the European Research Group. The group was formally incorporated on 15 May 2020. The group was formed to gain a "better understanding of China's economic ambitions and global role". This was to include Huawei's role in the UK's 5G network, China's COVID-19 disinformation campaign, and its foreign policy, in particular its relations with poorer regions of the world. Tugendhat served as the group's first director. On 26 March 2021, the group was sanctioned by the Chinese government. After Tugendhat was appointed as security minister in September 2022, Christopher Cash became the director of the CRG. In March 2023, Cash, along with researcher Christopher Berry, were arrested on suspicions of spying for China. The group dissolved on 9 September 2025.
