= John Farr (British politician) =

British politician

Sir John Arnold Farr (25 September 1922 – 25 October 1997) was a Conservative Party politician in the United Kingdom.

Born in Nottingham, Farr was educated at Harrow School and served with the Royal Navy during World War II. He became a farmer, Lloyd's member and director of a brewery company.

Farr contested Ilkeston in 1955. He was Member of Parliament (MP) for Harborough from 1959 until his retirement at the 1992 general election. In 1967 Farr referred to homosexuality as a "wrongful practice" and a "disease" and called on parliament to enact a provision to prevent its "spread" in prisons.

In 1974, a large amount of Farr's territory was hived off to create the new constituency of Blaby, which was won by future Chancellor of the Exchequer Nigel Lawson.

In 1960, he married Susan Milburn, daughter of Sir Leonard Milburn: the couple had two sons. Lady Farr died in 2011.

Parliament of the United Kingdom
| Preceded by John Baldock | Member of Parliament for Harborough; 1959–1992 | Succeeded by Edward Garnier |
