= Joseph Herbert Marshall =

Sir Joseph Herbert Marshall (1851–1918) was a concert impresario and Mayor of Leicester.

== Life ==
Joseph Herbert Marshall was born at Zouch Mills, near Hathern, Leicestershire.

Marshall was elected to Leicester town council in 1888, for East St. Mary's Ward, becoming Mayor in 1896 and an alderman in 1909. While Mayor he commemorated the Diamond Jubilee of Queen Victoria by raising £10,000 for the Jubilee Endowment Fund of the Leicester Royal Infirmary. He was knighted in 1905.

Herbert Marshall founded the Leicester Philharmonic Choir and for this choir commissioned the opera King Arthur from composer Colin McAlpin. It was performed in the Temperance Hall, Leicester on 4 November 1897.

He died at his home, Ratcliffe Lodge, Stoneygate, Leicester, in 1918 and was buried at Welford Road Cemetery.

== Sources ==
- Butt, Stephen (2013). The History of Leicester in 100 People. Leicester: Amberley. ISBN 9781445616858.
