= John Baldock =

British politician (1915–2003)

John Markham Baldock (19 November 1915 – 3 October 2003) was a British Conservative politician who served as a Member of Parliament (MP) in the 1950s.

John Baldock was born in Hollingbourne, Kent. He attended Rugby School and read Botany and Rural Economics at Balliol College, Oxford and obtained a Diploma in Rural Economics at Freiburg University.

He joined the Royal Naval Volunteer Reserve in 1935. During WW2 he served escorting Russian convoys in 1942-43, on the battleships Rodney and Ramillies and in the Atlantic, the Mediterranean and the Indian Ocean, rising to the rank of lieutenant-commander. He was awarded the Volunteer Reserve Decoration in 1949.

At the 1950 general election, he was elected as the MP for Harborough in Leicestershire, defeating the sitting Labour MP Humphrey Attewell. Baldock held the seat until he stood down from the House of Commons at the 1959 general election.

He is best known for establishing the Hollycombe Steam Collection in Sussex for which he later received an MBE for services to the preservation of English heritage.

An amateur yachtsman, he sailed the ketch-rigged yacht Racundra, originally built for Arthur Ransome, for about 20 years.

He died in Chichester aged 87. He was survived by his wife, Pauline, whom he married in 1949, and their two sons.

Parliament of the United Kingdom
Preceded by Humphrey Attewell	Member of Parliament for Harborough; 1950–1959	Succeeded by Sir John Farr
