= Humphrey Attewell =

British trade unionist and politician

- Attewell in 1946
- Born: Humphrey Cooper Attewell; 14 July 1894; Northampton, England
- Died: 15 October 1972 (aged 78)
- Occupations: trade unionist, politician
- Known for: National Union of Boot and Shoe Operatives
- Notable work: MP, Harborough (1945–1950)

Humphrey Cooper Attewell (14 July 1894 – 15 October 1972) was a British trade unionist and politician.

Attewell was born in Northampton. He served in World War I, then on his return became active in the National Union of Boot and Shoe Operatives (NUBSO). He was Labour Member of Parliament (MP) for Harborough from 1945 to 1950. After losing his seat, he served as the national organiser of NUBSO until his retirement in 1959.

Parliament of the United Kingdom
Preceded by Ronald Tree	Member of Parliament for Harborough; 1945 – 1950	Succeeded by John Baldock
