= Ronald Tree =

British Conservative politician, journalist and investor (1897–1976)

Ronald Tree MP
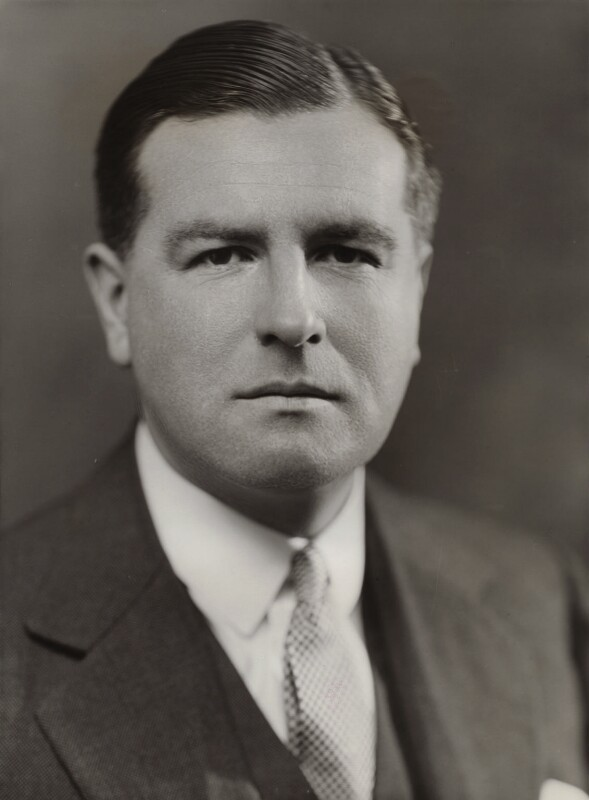
- Tree in 1936

Member of Parliament for Harborough
- In office 28 November 1933 – 5 July 1945
- Preceded by: The Earl Castle Stewart
- Succeeded by: Humphrey Attewell

Personal details
- Born: 26 September 1897 Eastbourne, Sussex, UK
- Died: 14 July 1976 (aged 78) London, UK
- Party: Conservative
- Spouses: Nancy Keene Field (née Perkins) (m. 1920–1947) Marietta FitzGerald (née Peabody) (m. 1947–1976)
- Children: Michael Lambert (with Nancy); Arthur Jeremy (with Nancy); Penelope (with Marietta)
- Parent(s): Arthur Magie Tree; Ethel Field

Arthur Ronald Lambert Field Tree (26 September 1897 – 14 July 1976) was a British Conservative Party politician, journalist and investor who served as the Member of Parliament (MP) for the Harborough constituency in Leicestershire from 1933 to 1945. He later established the Sandy Lane resort in Barbados.

== Biography ==
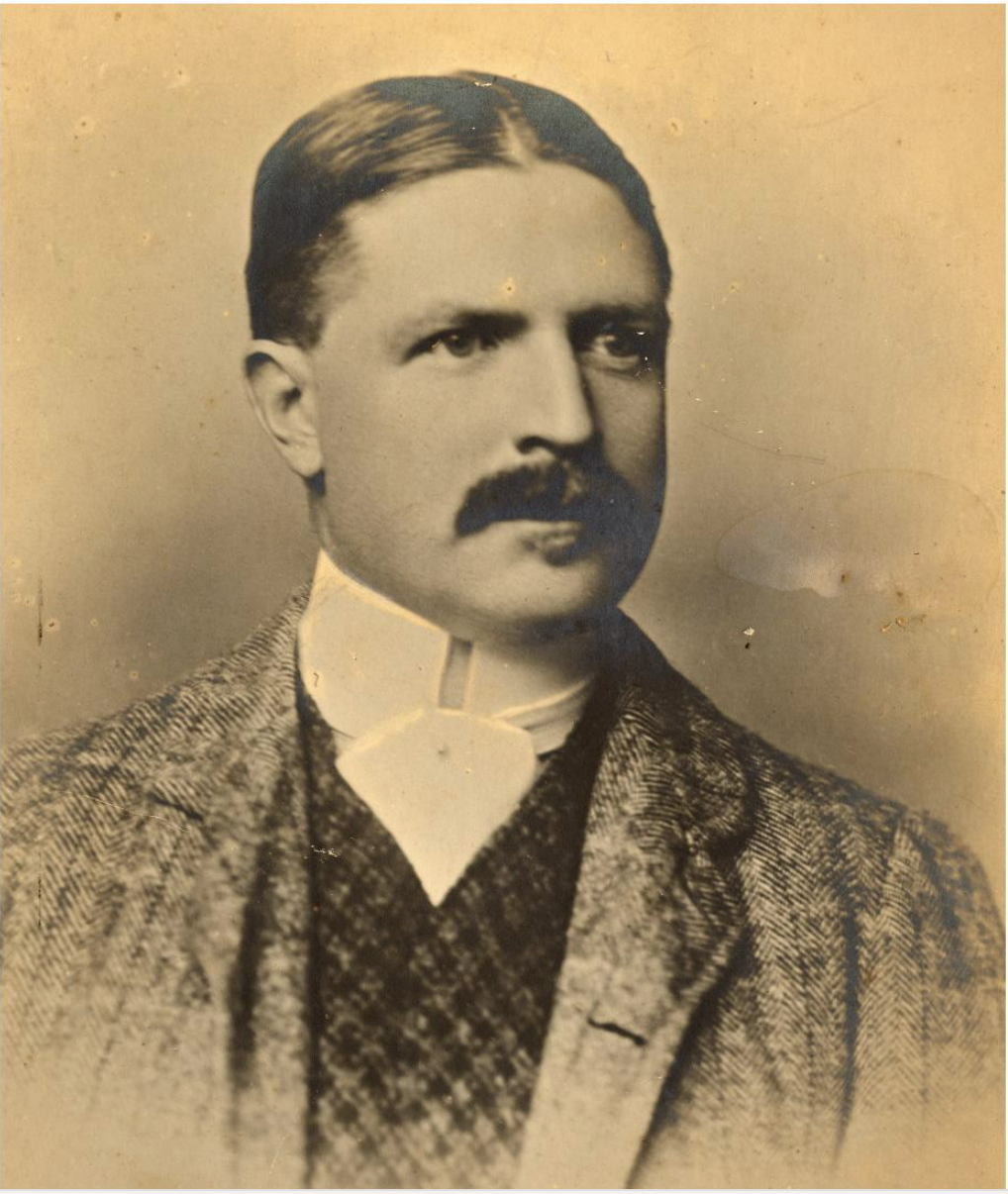
Arthur Magie Tree (1863–1914), taken as a young man

Tree's American-born father, Arthur Tree, was an English gentleman of leisure, self-identifying as a 'horse breeder and farmer' and son of Lambert Tree, a former U.S. minister to Russia. His mother, Ethel Field, was a daughter of Marshall Field, a co-founder of Marshall Field's department store in Chicago, Illinois. Born in Eastbourne, he was educated at Winchester College in England. Both sides of the family had great wealth and even though his parents divorced, Ronald and his father continued to enjoy a life of great luxury, not least Arthur's yacht The Adventuress.

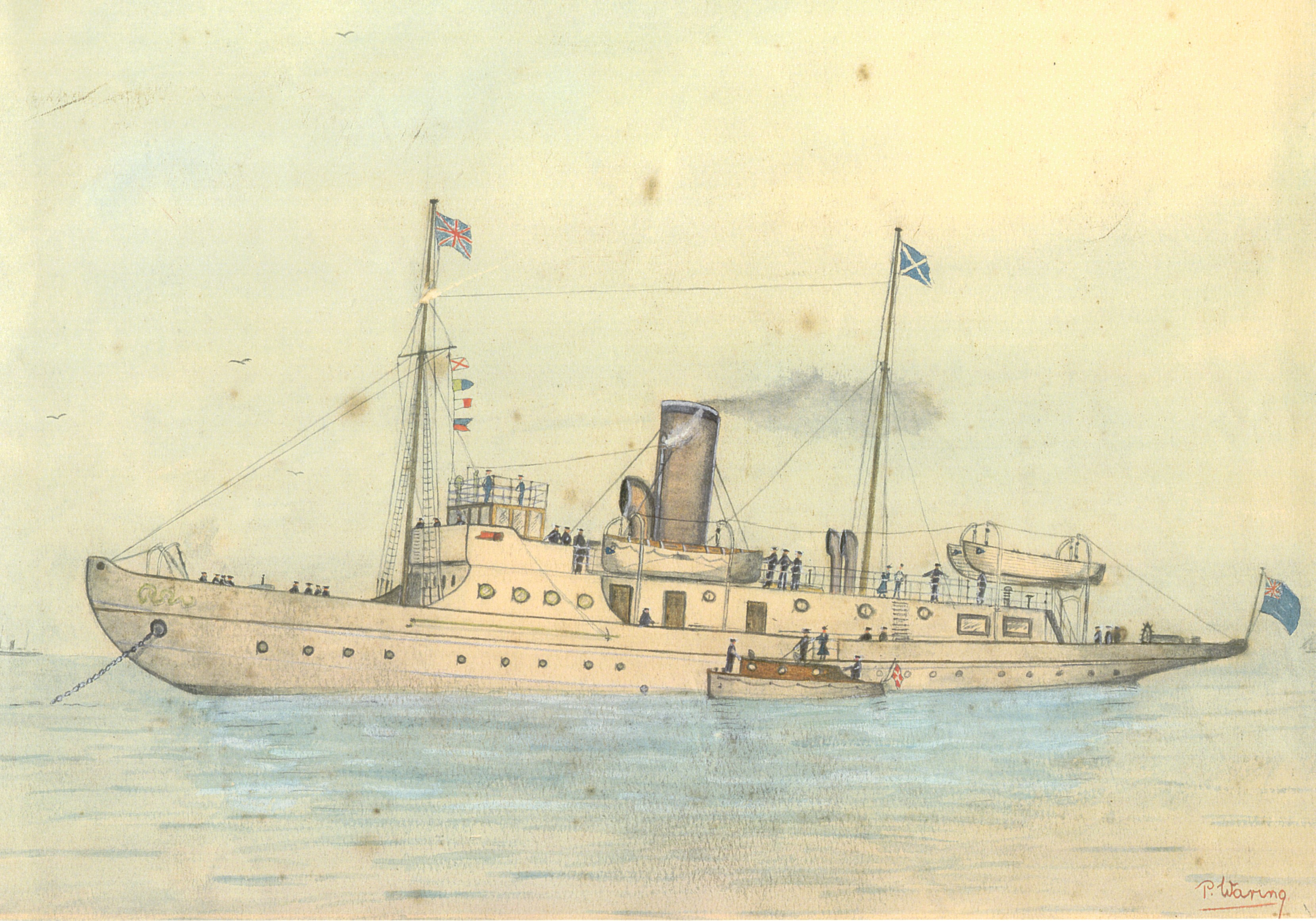
Arthur Magie Tree's Yacht, 'The Adventuress' built in South Shields (sketch)

Two months after his parents divorced in 1901, Tree's mother married her lover, Capt. David Beatty, the future 1st Earl Beatty and First Sea Lord. His half-siblings were David Beatty, 2nd Earl Beatty, and the Hon Peter Beatty; he also had two full siblings, both of whom died in infancy. After the divorce, he remained with his father at Ashorne Hill House, Warwickshire, as the court had given Arthur custody of Ronald. There he was tutored by a convent girl from Cork in Ireland, his governess Kate Walsh, who was also Arthur's partner, the mother of six further half-siblings of Ronald; Dennis (1898–1969), Kathleen (1901–1975), Patrick (1905–1991), James, Gerald and Elizabeth Waring (1914–1991). Arthur and Kate were never married and while Ronald grew up with them at Ashorne Hill, he would have had little or no contact with a Catholic, half-Irish and illegitimate family after Arthur's death in 1914, when Ronald was already at the cusp of adulthood. Dennis, Kathleen and Patrick all had issue including notable architect, Michael Blower.

Tree edited Forum Magazine in New York from 1922, and in 1926 became involved in investment on the New York Stock Exchange, before the Wall Street Crash of 1929.

=== Politics ===
Tree returned to England with his wife, the former Nancy Keene Perkins (the widow of his cousin Henry Marshall Field) in 1927, where they had two sons, artist, Michael Lambert Tree and racehorse trainer, Jeremy Tree, and a daughter, who died at birth. At first the couple took a 10-year repairing lease on Kelmarsh Hall in Northamptonshire (near Market Harborough) which Nancy redecorated with help from Mrs Guy Bethell of Elden Ltd.

In November 1933, Ronald was elected Member of Parliament (MP) for Harborough in Leicestershire. In the same year, the couple bought Ditchley House and Park near Charlbury, Oxfordshire as their home, and it was the decoration of this house which earned Nancy the reputation of having "the finest taste of almost anyone in the world." She worked on it with Lady Colefax and the French decorator Stéphane Boudin of the Paris firm Jansen.

Tree was among a small group who saw the rising Nazi party in Germany as a threat to Britain, and using his home as its base he became friends with the group's leader, Winston Churchill. Churchill and his wife Clementine dined at Ditchley on numerous occasions from 1937.

In February 1938, after Anthony Eden resigned as foreign secretary from Neville Chamberlain over the conduct of foreign policy, Tree himself became a follower of Eden, known then as the "Glamour boys," a pejorative term used by the Conservative Party whips' office, headed by David Margesson.

=== World War II ===
On the outbreak of war, the security forces were concerned by the visibility of Churchill's country house Chartwell, its high topographical location and the fact it was south of London making it an easy target for German bombers returning from raids on the capital. The Prime Minister's official retreat of Chequers was also deemed vulnerable to attack. Churchill had use of the Paddock bunker in Neasden, but only used it on one occasion for a cabinet meeting, before returning to his Cabinet War Room bunker in Whitehall. However, this created additional difficulties on clear nights when a full moon was predicted (or as Churchill romantically termed it 'When the Moon is High') – so the authorities looked for an alternate site north of London. Tree offered Churchill use of Ditchley, which thanks to its tree coverage and no visible access road made it an ideal site with which Churchill was happy. Churchill first went to Ditchley in lieu of Chequers on 9 November 1940, accompanied by Clementine and his daughter Mary. By late 1942, security measures at Chequers had improved, notably including covering the road with turf. The last weekend Churchill attended Ditchley as his official residence was Tree's birthday on 26 September 1942. Churchill's last visit was for lunch in 1943.

Churchill gave Tree a job in the Ministry of Information, where he met a married American co-worker Marietta Peabody FitzGerald and began a romantic relationship.

He left Parliament when, in the election in 1945 at the end of the war, he was defeated by the Labour candidate at Harborough by 204 votes.

=== Marriage to Marietta Peabody ===
Although Tree was bisexual and twenty years older than Marietta, at the end of World War II, Tree and Peabody divorced their respective spouses, and then married on 26 July 1947; they had one child, Penelope (born 1949), who became a celebrated fashion model in the 1960s.

Marietta moved into Ditchley, but found herself bored with English country life. Tree and most of his friends were conservatives, and Democrat Marietta found herself isolated. Recognising his wife's unhappiness, and for the first time in his life short of money due to the taxation of Foreign Trust income enacted by the 1945 Labour Government, Tree sold Ditchley and agreed to return to New York with Marietta, her daughter Frances FitzGerald, their daughter, and his butler Collins.

Marietta immediately joined the Lexington Democratic Club, and two years later was elected the county chairwoman. She was elected to the Democratic State Committee in 1954. In 1952, Marietta became involved in the presidential election campaign of Adlai Stevenson, and in the later 1956 campaign - both defeats. This did not put her off politics, and John F Kennedy appointed her to the United Nations Commission on Human Rights in 1961.

Marietta had started an affair with Adlai Stevenson between his two failed presidential campaigns, but her husband was unfazed by this, as the couple's marriage had largely disintegrated to a friendly separation, with Tree spending much of his time at Heron Bay, his house in Barbados. Marietta had turned down the option of returning to her earlier lover, the director John Huston, even when he had given her a role in his 1960 movie The Misfits. It was while walking in London with Marietta that Adlai suffered a heart attack, and later died at St. George's Hospital. That night in her diary, Marietta wrote, "Adlai is dead. We were together."

Ronald Tree died of a stroke on 14 July 1976 in London, England.

== Houses of Ronald Tree ==
Ronald Tree was, like his grandfather Lambert Tree and his father Arthur, a prominent owner and connoisseur of fine houses, both commissioning, restoring and owning some of the finest houses on both sides of the Atlantic. In his childhood, Ronald would have known both the Tree family house at 94 Cass Street, (now Wabash but since demolished) built to a design by the eminent Henry Hobson Richardson, one of the greatest of American architects in the latter half of the 19th C. and the Tree Studio Building and Annexes, a surviving example of the work of Parfitt Brothers architects and now on the U.S. National Register of Historic Places. In England, Ronald was raised in his parents' Grade II Listed Ashorne Hill House commissioned from the architect Edward Goldie in the style of a grand country house, with a touch of the arts & crafts, but also with a late-Victorian eclectic flourish. Arthur and Ronald also lived for a time at a (now Grade II*) London house in Harrington Gardens designed by the significant Victorian architects of Sir Ernest George and Peto. Following his father and grandfather, Ronald was the owner at various times of two of England's finest historic country houses, Ditchley Park and Kelmarsh Hall. It was at Ditchley where Winston Churchill would sometimes repair during the darkest days of war. With a foot in England and one across the Atlantic, it is not surprising that he enjoyed the warmer climes and relaxed colonial ambience of Barbados - not least escaping post-War austerity - where he founded and built the Sandy Lane resort and hotel towards the end of his life. On the island, he worked closely with Sir Geoffrey Jellicoe on his own island home Heron Bay, built just after the closure of War and one of the finest neo-Palladian mansions of the New World. In New York, he also lived for a time at the Ogden Codman House, a grand town house on the Upper East Side.

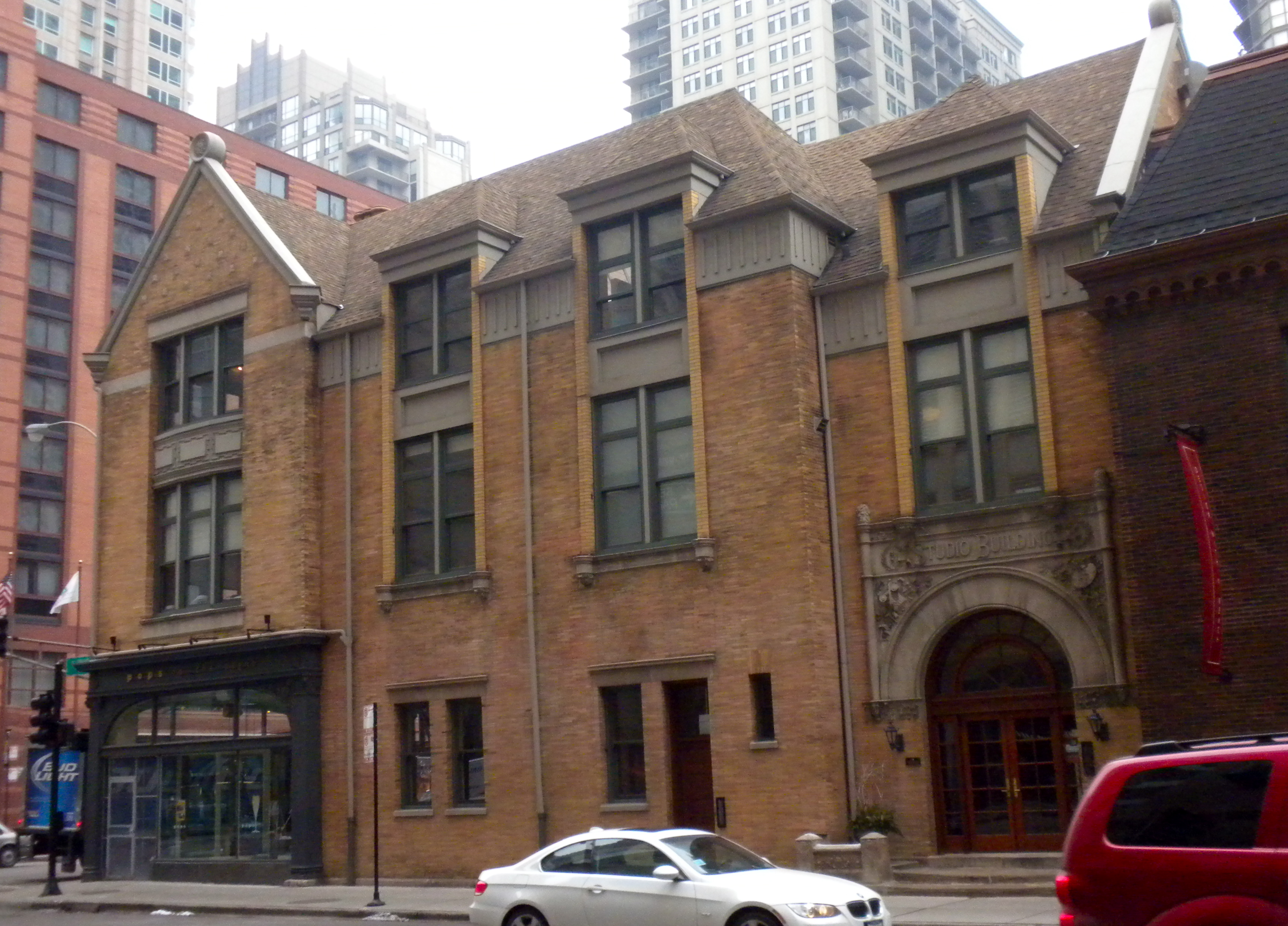
Studio BLG Chicago

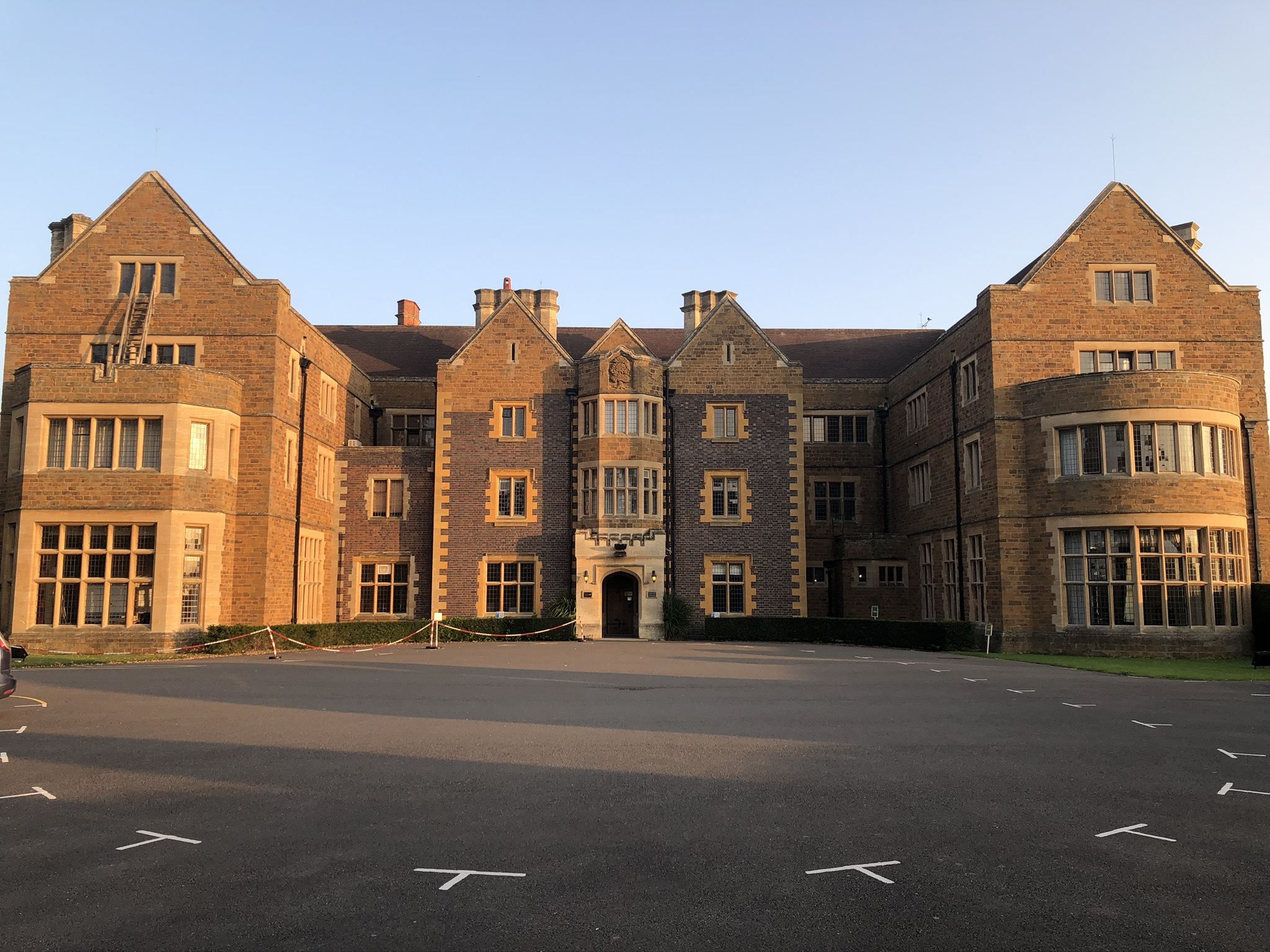
Ashorne HIll House, Ashorne, Warwickshire, North Front

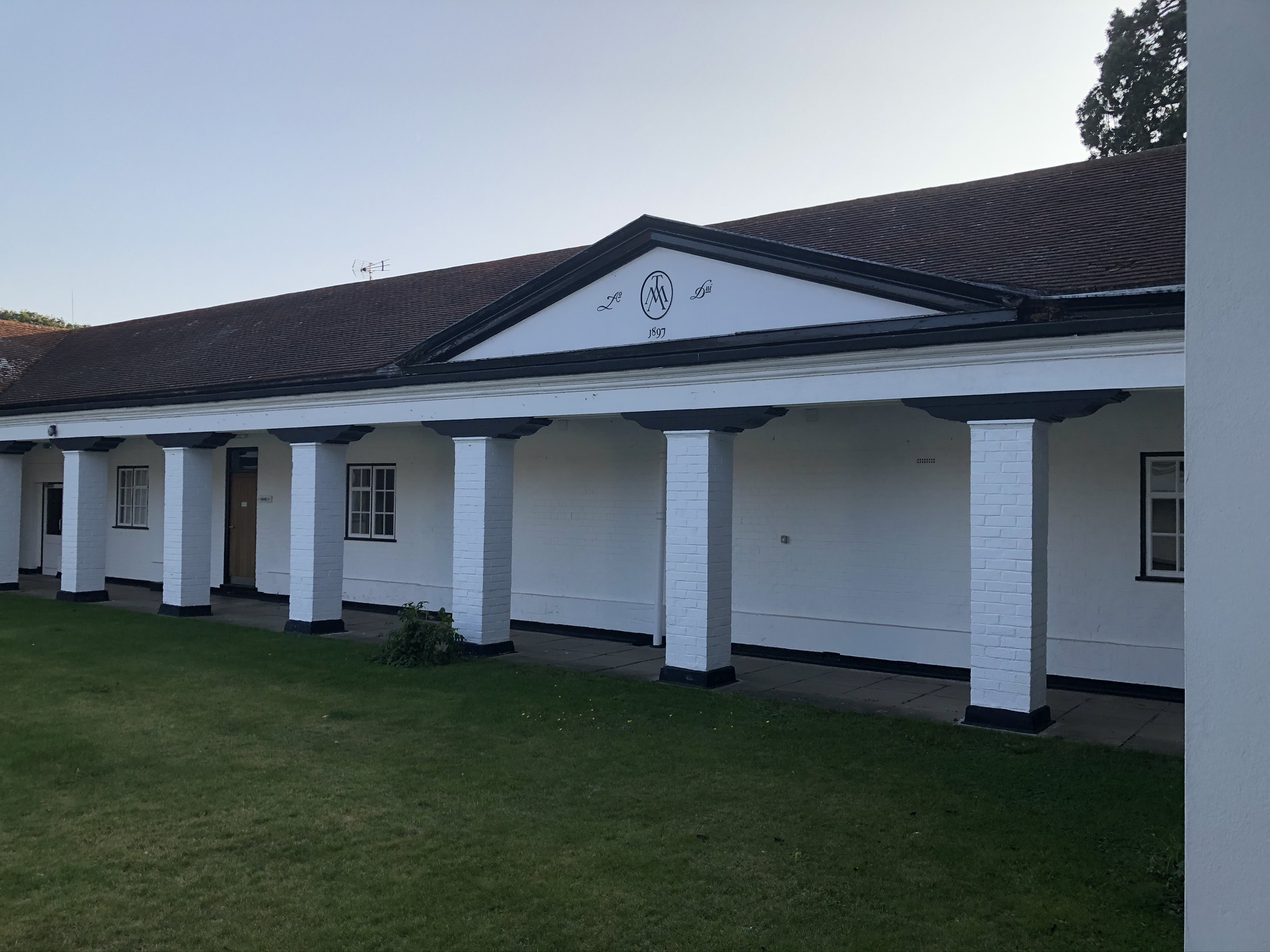
Stable courtyard at Ashorne Hill House, Warwickshire

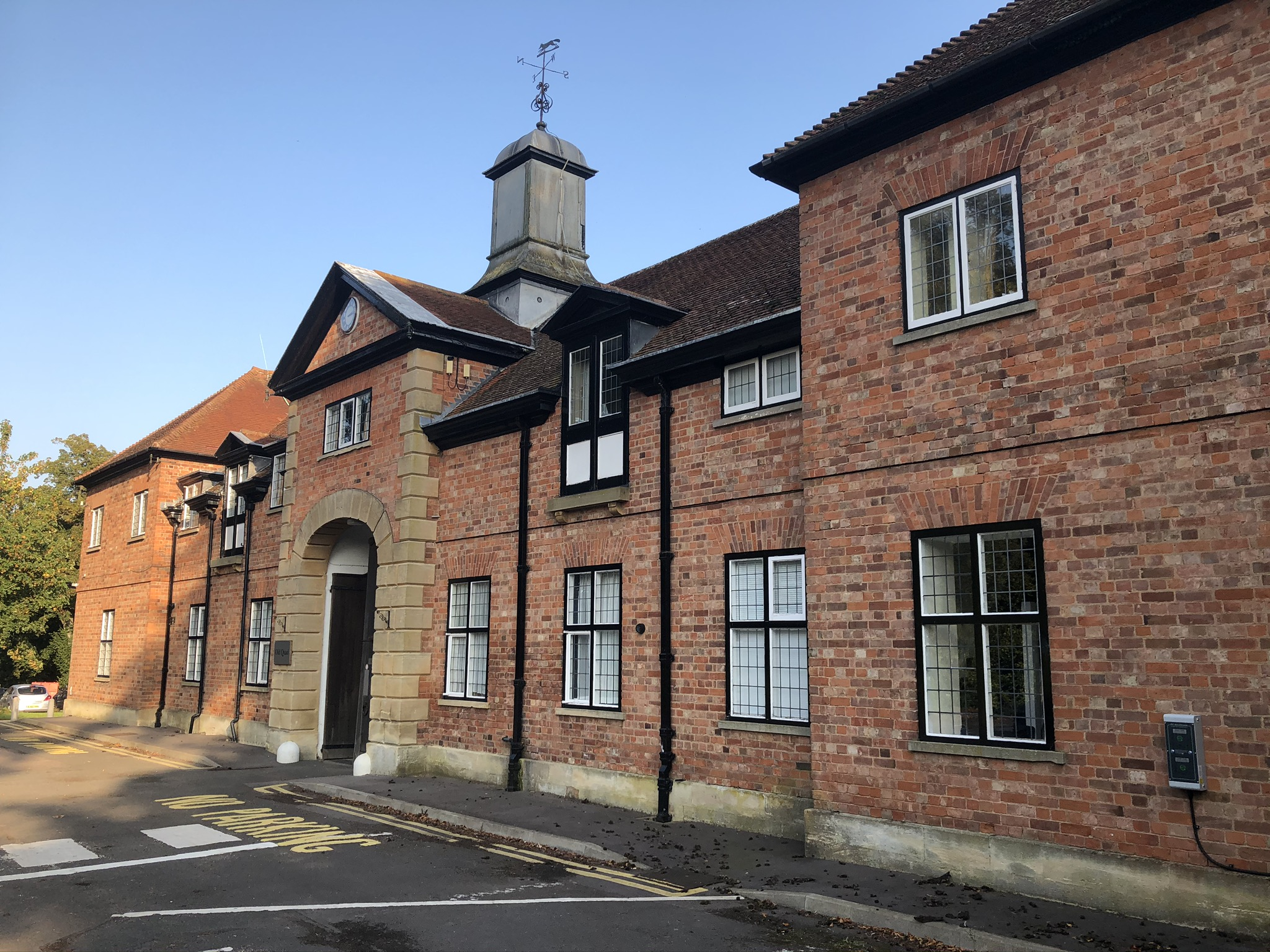
Stables at Ashorne Hill House, Ashorne, Warwickshire

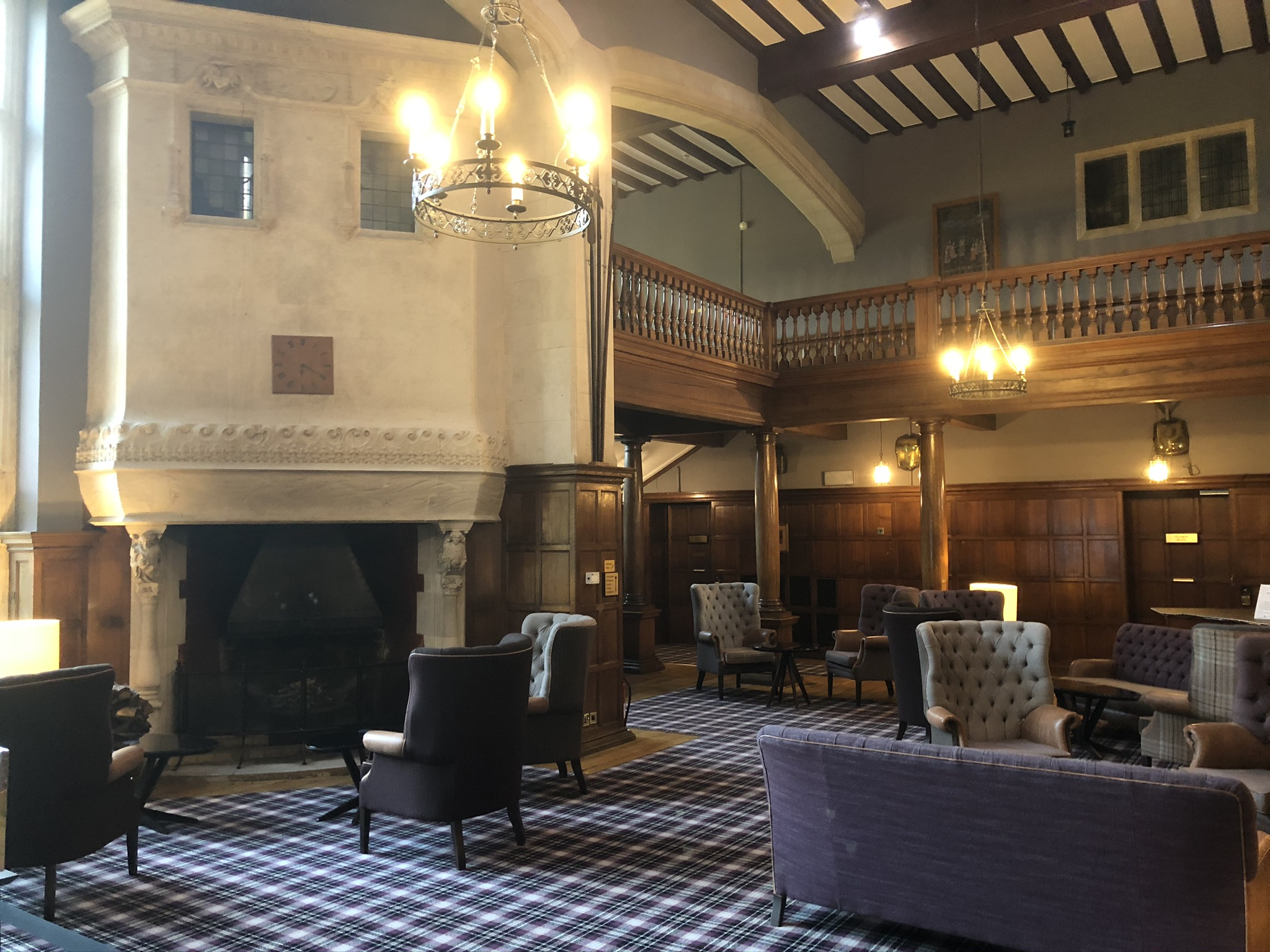
Ashorne Hill House, Ashorne, Warwickshire - The Great Hall

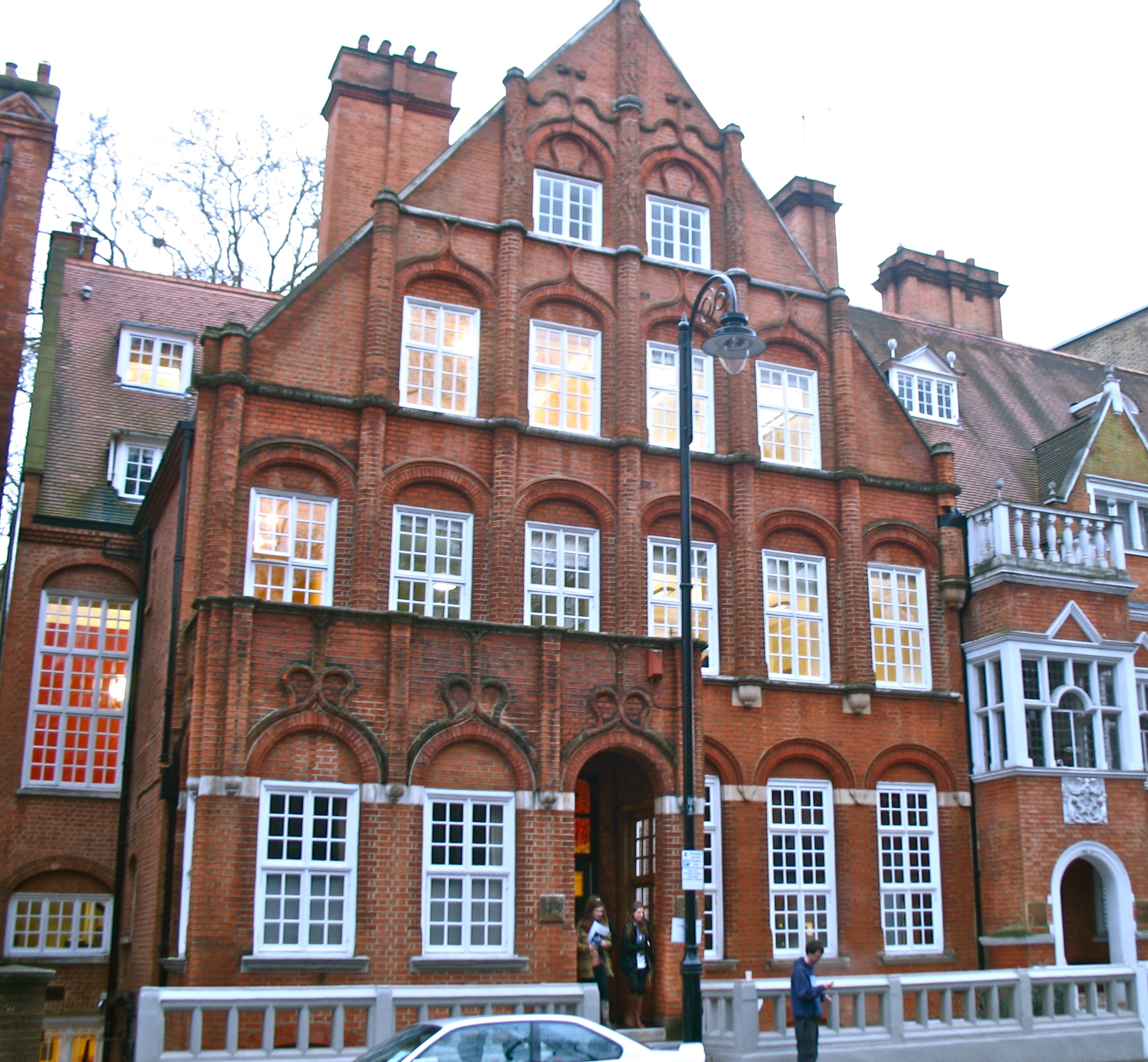
43 Harrington Gardens - BU London

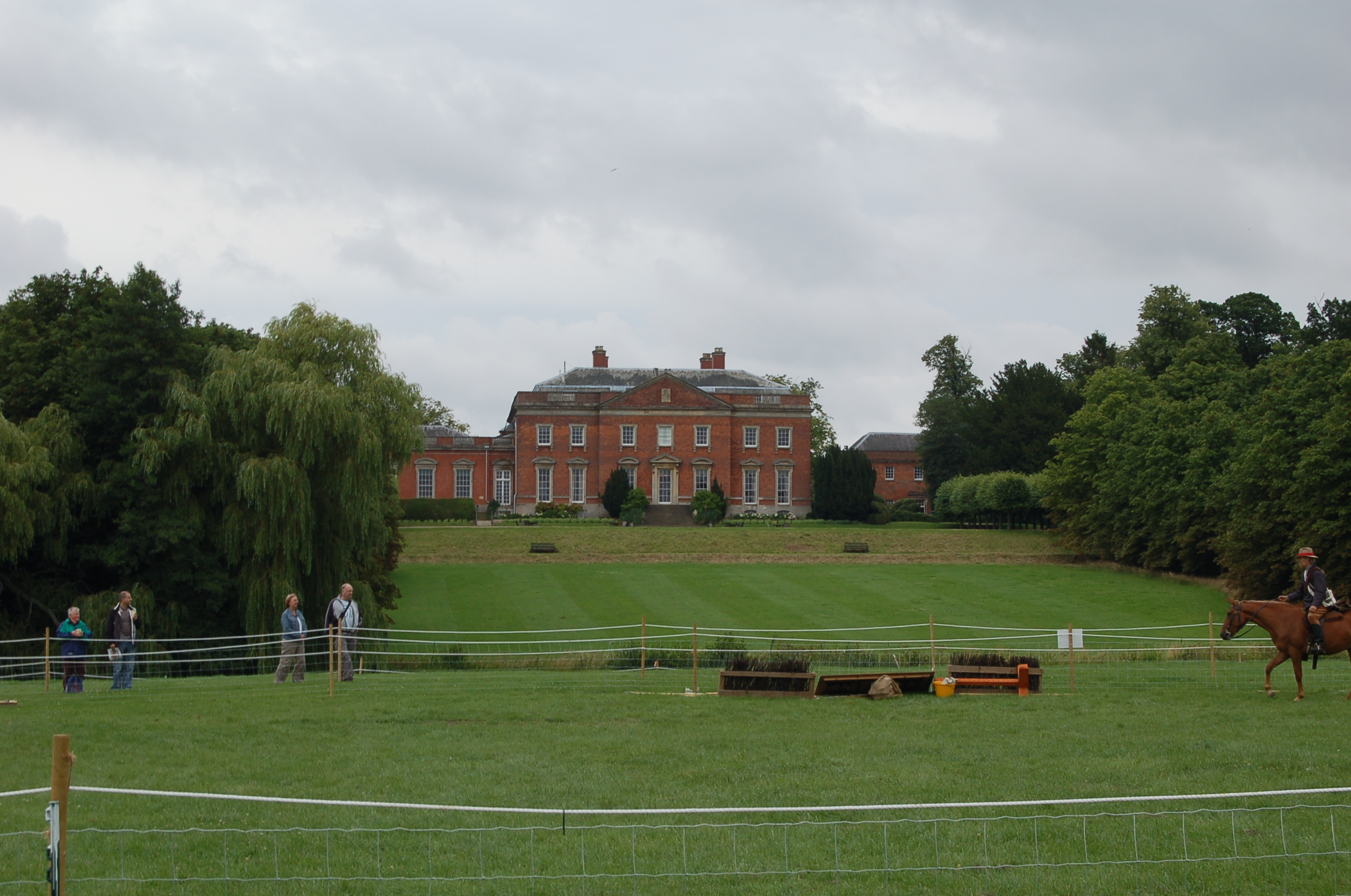
Kelmarsh Hall (2)

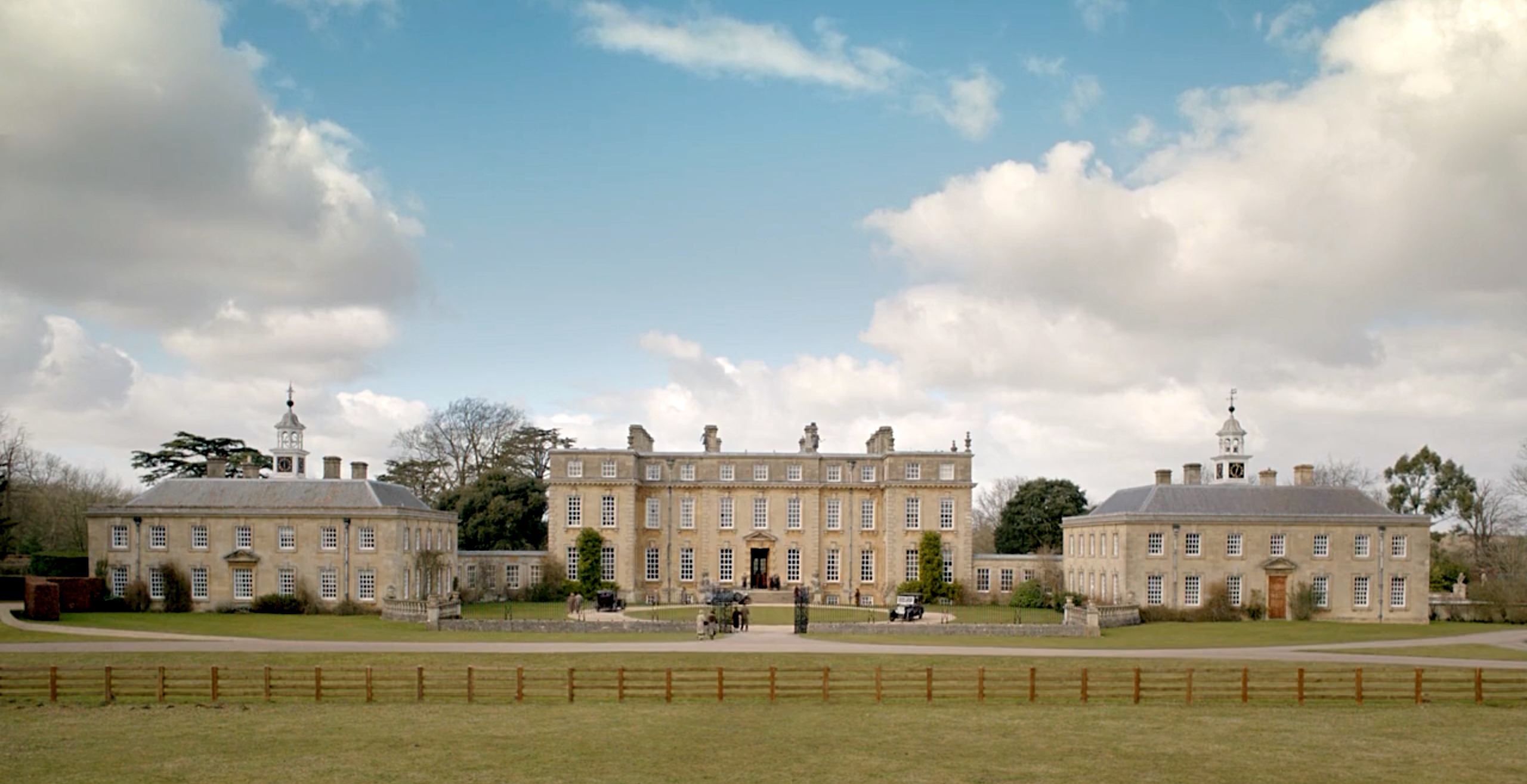
Front view of Ditchley House

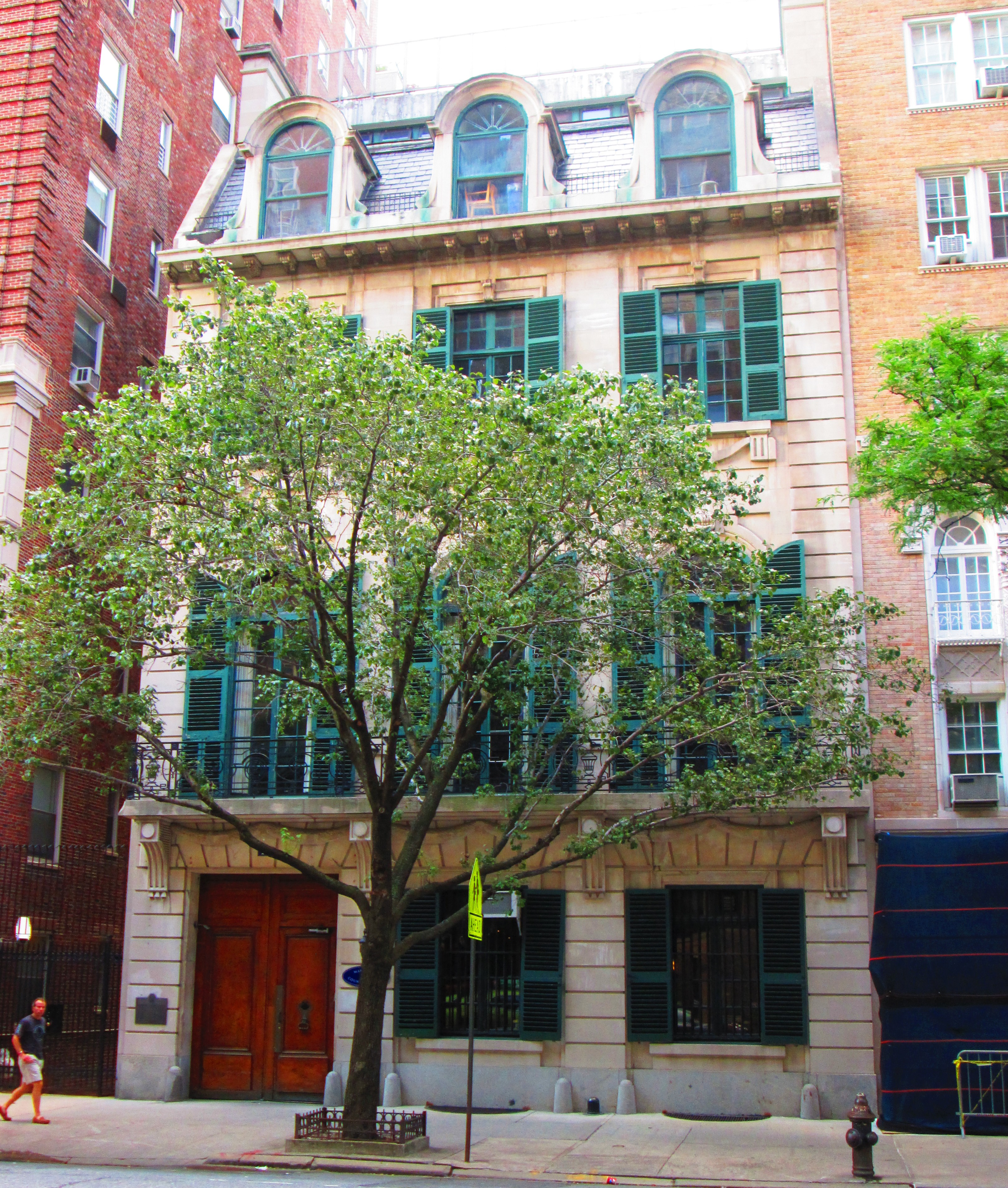
Ogden Codman, Jr. House 7 East 96th Street from east

== Books ==
- A History of Barbados (Rupert Hart-Davis, 1972); revised ed. by E. L. Crozier (1981) ISBN 978-0-246-11036-7
- When the Moon Was High: Memoirs of Peace and War, 1897-1942 (Macmillan, 1975) ISBN 978-0-333-18074-7

Parliament of the United Kingdom
| Preceded by The Earl Castle Stewart | Member of Parliament for Harborough; 1933–1945 | Succeeded by Humphrey Attewell |
