= Edward Garnier =

British barrister and Conservative Party politician

The Right Honourable The Lord Garnier PC KC
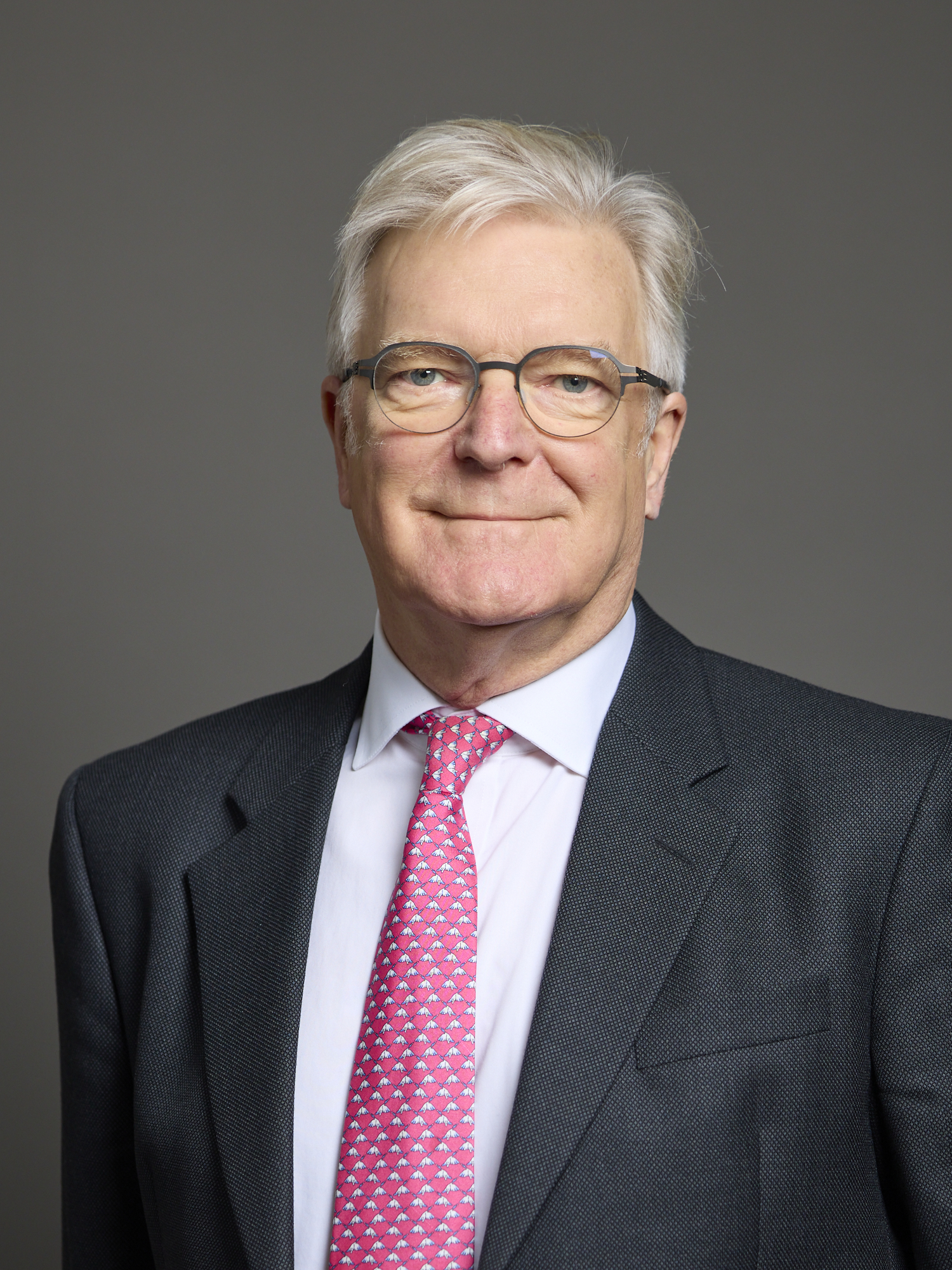
- Official portrait, 2025

Solicitor General for England and Wales
- In office 13 May 2010 – 4 September 2012
- Prime Minister: David Cameron
- Preceded by: Vera Baird
- Succeeded by: Oliver Heald

Shadow Attorney General for England and Wales
- In office 8 September 2009 – 11 May 2010
- Leader: David Cameron
- Preceded by: Dominic Grieve
- Succeeded by: The Baroness Scotland of Asthal
- In office 19 June 1997 – 13 September 2001
- Leader: William Hague; Iain Duncan Smith
- Preceded by: Nicholas Lyell
- Succeeded by: Bill Cash

Shadow Minister for Prisons
- In office 10 May 2005 – 8 September 2009
- Leader: David Cameron
- Preceded by: Jonathan Djanogly
- Succeeded by: Alan Duncan

Member of the House of Lords
- Lord Temporal
- Life peerage 22 June 2018

Member of Parliament for Harborough
- In office 9 April 1992 – 3 May 2017
- Preceded by: John Farr
- Succeeded by: Neil O'Brien

Personal details
- Born: 26 October 1952 (age 73) Wuppertal, West Germany (now Germany)
- Party: Conservative
- Spouse: Anna Mellows
- Education: Wellington College
- Alma mater: Jesus College, Oxford; Inns of Court School of Law
- Website: Official website

Edward Henry Garnier, Baron Garnier, PC, KC (born 26 October 1952) is a British barrister and former Conservative Party politician in the United Kingdom. A former lawyer for The Guardian newspaper, Lord Garnier is on the socially liberal wing of his party and was the Member of Parliament (MP) for Harborough in Leicestershire from 1992 until 2017. He most recently served as Solicitor General for England and Wales from the election of 2010 until the 2012 ministerial reshuffle. He stood down from the House of Commons at the 2017 general election before entering the House of Lords in 2018.

== Early life ==
Edward Garnier was born in Germany, the youngest son of Colonel William d'Arcy Garnier and Lavender née de Grey (eldest daughter of the 8th Baron Walsingham). He was educated at Wellington College. He read Modern History at Jesus College, Oxford, graduating with a Bachelor of Arts (BA) degree in 1974. As per tradition, his BA was promoted to MA (Oxon) in 1976; he then studied for Bar Finals at the Inns of Court School of Law in London.

== Legal career ==
Garnier was called to the Bar at the Middle Temple in 1976. He is a practising barrister specialising in libel. He took silk (became a Queen's Counsel) in 1995, and was appointed as a Crown Court Assistant Recorder in 1998 and as a Recorder (part-time Circuit Judge) in 2000.

He represented Edwina Currie following an article in the Daily Express by Peter Oborne alleging she was the "vilest woman in Britain". Currie won £30,000 in damages in March 2000. In 2013, he also represented Lord McAlpine at the High Court following allegations made on Twitter by Sally Bercow, wife of the Commons speaker.

Garnier represented former Prime Minister John Major in the High Court and UK Supreme Court hearings regarding the prorogation of parliament in September 2019. Major was arguing against the prorogation, which was instigated by Major's successor Boris Johnson.

== House of Commons ==
Garnier unsuccessfully contested the safe Labour seat of Hemsworth in West Yorkshire at the 1987 general election. At the 1992 general election, he was elected MP for Harborough with a majority of 13,543 following the retirement of his Conservative predecessor Sir John Farr, and made his maiden speech just after midnight on 20 May 1992.

In the House of Commons, he served on the home affairs select committee from 1992 until he was appointed as the Parliamentary Private Secretary (PPS) to the Minister of State at the Foreign and Commonwealth Office Alastair Goodlad and David Davis for a year in 1994. In 1996 he became the PPS to the Attorney General Nicholas Lyell and in 1997 he was briefly the PPS to the Chancellor of the Duchy of Lancaster Roger Freeman.

He joined the frontbench under William Hague as a spokesman on the Lord Chancellor's Department in 1997 and entered the Shadow Cabinet in 1999 as the Shadow Attorney General, according to a BBC News report earning wide acclaim for a thoughtful performance in that role, in which he demonstrated his legal expertise without becomingly excessively partisan. He returned to the backbenches after the 2001 general election but became Opposition Spokesman for Home Affairs after the 2005 general election and later Shadow Attorney General. In 2009, he was elected Chair of the newly formed All-Party Parliamentary Group on Privacy.

On 5 February 2013, Garnier voted against in the House of Commons Second Reading vote on the Marriage (Same Sex Couples) Bill.

In April 2017, Garnier announced his intention to retire and not to contest his seat in the upcoming general election, to be held on 8 June 2017, after 25 years as MP for Harborough.

=== Compulsory annuity purchases ===
Garnier has long campaigned against compulsory annuity purchases for sums above the minimum income threshold and has introduced or supported several Private Members Bills on the issue. On 21 November 2002, he came 4th in the ballot for Private Members Bills. With cross-party support from leading backbench pensions experts Sir John Butterfill, Frank Field and LibDem Pensions spokesman Steve Webb he introduced the Retirement Income Reform Bill. This Bill was dropped in July 2003, reintroduced on 7 January 2004 and eventually withdrawn in April 2004.

=== Constituency issues ===
==== Pennbury eco-town ====
Garnier has raised the issue of eco-towns around 20 times in Parliament. One of these, Pennbury, housing 40,000 people, was to be near Stoughton, Leicestershire. Garnier was granted an adjournment debate on 29 January 2008.

Garnier argued that although the eco-town principle was sound, Pennbury - a rural site not a brownfield one - lacked the necessary transport infrastructure and was unlikely to be able to provide jobs. Furthermore, building a suitable road from the M1 motorway, "a distance of about 20 miles ..would cost the thick end of £1 billion". The Pennbury proposal was dropped in July 2009.

==== British United Shoe Machinery ====
Garnier's constituents were amongst 544 British United Shoe Machinery workers who lost their pensions following the company entering Administration in 2000. Workers joined Ros Altmann's company pensions campaign blaming Venture Capitalist Apax Partners for having engineered the collapse and Garnier was the first East Midlands MP to question Apax's role. Apax's chairman at the time was a major donor to the Labour Party and Garnier asked what discussions "Ministers have had with Sir Ronald Cohen ..about the collapse of the pension scheme". Garnier raised the issue again with the new Minister for Pensions Reform Stephen Timms citing the "mysterious circumstances" under which the pensions disappeared. Timms agreed to "look into" the complaints saying that "in recent years, there have been too many instances of that kind." The press expected a proper enquiry but although in September 2005 Timms wrote back to Garnier refusing this, December 2007 saw compensation of £2.9 billion awarded nationally to failed Company Pension Scheme workers. In all Garnier referenced BUSM twelve times, and "was a really valuable advocate in the campaign to recover the pensions".

==== St Luke's hospital Market Harborough ====
In June 2015 Garnier called on Jeremy Hunt to "get a grip on those allegedly in charge of the project" at St Luke's hospital which he said had become a local joke. He claimed the project had been the subject of delays since 1992.

=== Solicitor General ===
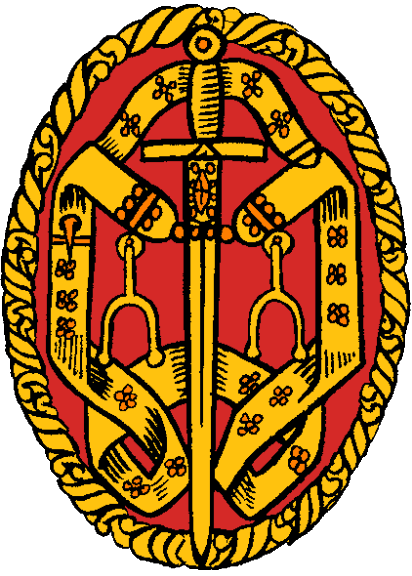
Insignia of Knight Bachelor

Garnier was Solicitor General from May 2010 to September 2012. He was appointed a Knight Bachelor after the reshuffle that ended his time as Solicitor General.

In November 2014, The Daily Telegraph reported allegations that Garnier requested that Simon Danczuk "think very carefully" about what he said to the Home Affairs select committee about Leon Brittan and the missing Westminster paedophile dossier. Danczuk said that Brittan was in poor health, and that Garnier, an old friend, had been asked to intervene by Brittan's wife.

On 30 March 2015, he was appointed to the Privy Council of the United Kingdom and was therefore granted the title The Right Honourable.

=== Brexit ===
Garnier was opposed to Brexit before the 2016 referendum. Following a successful legal challenge to the use of the Royal Prerogative to invoke article 50, Garnier advised against appealing to the Supreme Court. He believed the chances of winning were low, proceeding would have been costly, and it would have provided another "opportunity for ill-motivated people to attack the judiciary to misconstrue the motives of both parties". The former Attorney General Dominic Grieve also thought the appeal was pointless.

== House of Lords ==
On 22 June 2018, Garnier was created a life peer as Baron Garnier, of Harborough in the County of Leicestershire, thus becoming a member of the House of Lords.

== Personal life ==
Garnier married Anna Caroline Mellows on 17 April 1982.

He was a Visiting Fellow of St Antony's College, Oxford in 1996 and is a keen follower of cricket, being a member of Leicestershire CCC. He speaks proficient French and enjoys 19th-century French literature.

His cousin is Mark Garnier who has been the Member of Parliament for Wyre Forest since the 2010 general election.

== Publications ==
- Halsbury's Laws of England contribution by Edward Garnier, 1985, Butterworth ISBN 0-406-03000-6
- Bearing the Standard: Themes for a Fourth Term contribution by Edward Garnier, 1991, Conservative Political Centre ISBN 0-85070-824-9
- Facing the Future by Edward Garnier, 1993

Parliament of the United Kingdom
Preceded by John Farr	Member of Parliament for Harborough; 1992–2017	Succeeded by Neil O'Brien
Political offices
Preceded by Nicholas Lyell	Shadow Attorney General for England and Wales; 1997–2001	Succeeded by Bill Cash
Preceded by Dominic Grieve	Shadow Attorney General for England and Wales; 2009–2010	Succeeded by The Baroness Scotland of Asthal
Preceded by Vera Baird	Solicitor General for England and Wales; 2010–2012	Succeeded by Oliver Heald
Orders of precedence in the United Kingdom
Preceded by The Lord McNicol of West Kilbride	Gentlemen; Baron Garnier	Followed by The Lord Randall of Uxbridge
