= Harborough, Oadby and Wigston =

Parliamentary constituency in the United Kingdom, 1885 onwards

Coordinates: 52.5°N 1.0°W

- County constituency for the House of Commons
- Interactive map of boundaries since 2024
- Location within the East Midlands
- County: Leicestershire
- Electorate: 74,810 (March 2020)
- Major settlements: Market Harborough, Oadby, Wigston

Current constituency
- Created: 1885
- Member of Parliament: Neil O'Brien (Conservative)
- Seats: One
- Created from: South Leicestershire

Harborough, Oadby and Wigston (/ˈhɑːrbərə, -bʌrə/) is a constituency (Note: A county constituency (for the purposes of election expenses and type of returning officer)) covering the south east of Leicestershire (Note: But excluding Blaby District since 1974) represented in the House of Commons of the UK Parliament (Note: As with all constituencies, the constituency elects one Member of Parliament (MP) by the first past the post system of election at least every five years.) since 2017 by Neil O'Brien of the Conservative Party.

It is considered a safe seat for the Conservative Party, as the seat has been represented by a Conservative MP since 1950.

Although the constituency had always, since its creation in 1885, contained the towns of Oadby and Wigston, it was formally known as Harborough up until the 2024 general election. Further to the 2023 review of Westminster constituencies, the Boundary Commission for England recommended that it be renamed Harborough, Oadby and Wigston.

== Constituency profile ==
The Harborough, Oadby and Wigston constituency is located in Leicestershire. It contains the suburban towns of Oadby and Wigston—which lie on the outskirts of the city of Leicester and form part of its wider urban area—the outlying town of Market Harborough and the villages of Great Glen and Kibworth. Oadby and Wigston grew during the 20th century as commuter towns serving Leicester. Wigston has average levels of wealth whilst Oadby is affluent. Market Harborough is a historic market town and is also generally wealthy. House prices in the constituency are similar to national averages and higher than the rest of the East Midlands.

Compared to the rest of the country, residents of the constituency are older and more likely to be homeowners. They have high levels of income and professional employment. White people made up 75% of the population at the 2021 census and Asians, mostly Indians, were the largest ethnic minority group at 18%. The Asian community is concentrated in Oadby, where they make up around half the population. At the local council level, the constituency's three towns are mostly represented by Liberal Democrats whilst the rural areas and villages elected Conservatives. An estimated 52% of voters in the constituency supported leaving the European Union in the 2016 referendum, identical to the nationwide figure.

== Boundaries ==
Map of boundaries 2010–2024

=== Historic (Harborough) ===
1885–1918: The Municipal Borough of Leicester, the Sessional Divisions of Lutterworth and Market Harborough, and parts of the Sessional Divisions of Leicester and East Norton.

1918–1950: The Urban Districts of Market Harborough, Oadby, and Wigston, and the Rural Districts of Blaby, Hallaton, Lutterworth, and Market Harborough.

1950–1955: The Urban Districts of Market Harborough, Oadby, and Wigston, and the Rural Districts of Blaby, Lutterworth, and Market Harborough.

1955–1974: The Urban Districts of Market Harborough and Wigston, and the Rural Districts of Blaby, Lutterworth, and Market Harborough.

1974–1983: The Urban Districts of Market Harborough, Oadby, and Wigston, and the Rural Districts of Billesdon and Market Harborough.

1983–1997: The District of Harborough wards of Billesdon, Bosworth, Easton, Fleckney, Glen, Houghton, Kibworth, Langton, Lubenham, Market Harborough Bowden, Market Harborough North, Market Harborough South, Market Harborough West, Scraptoft, Thurnby, and Tilton, and the Borough of Oadby and Wigston.

1997–2010: The District of Harborough wards of Bosworth, Fleckney, Glen, Kibworth, Langton, Lubenham, Market Harborough Bowden, Market Harborough North, Market Harborough South, and Market Harborough West, and the Borough of Oadby and Wigston wards of All Saints, Bassett, Brocks Hill, Brookside, Central, Fairfield, Grange, St Peter's, St Wolstan's, and Westfield.

2010–2024: The District of Harborough wards of Bosworth, Fleckney, Glen, Kibworth, Lubenham, Market Harborough Great Bowden and Arden, Market Harborough Little Bowden, Market Harborough Logan, and Market Harborough Welland, and the Borough of Oadby and Wigston wards of Oadby Brocks Hill, Oadby Grange, Oadby St Peter's, Oadby Uplands, Oadby Woodlands, South Wigston, Wigston All Saints, Wigston Fields, Wigston Meadowcourt, and Wigston St Wolstan's.

=== Current (Harborough, Oadby and Wigston) ===
Further to the 2023 boundary review, the composition of the constituency is as follows from the 2024 general election (as they existed on 1 December 2020):

- The District of Harborough wards of: Glen; Kibworths; Lubenham; Market Harborough – Great Bowden & Arden; Market Harborough – Little Bowden; Market Harborough – Logan; Market Harborough – Welland.
- The Borough of Oadby and Wigston.

Minor adjustments to take account of ward boundary changes.

The constituency takes its name from the town of Market Harborough, seat of the Harborough local government district, combined with the Borough of Oadby and Wigston which adjoins Leicester.

== History ==
The seat was created in the Redistribution of Seats Act 1885 and in boundary changes in 1974 reflecting the growth in population and electorate of Leicestershire lost a large amount of its territory to the new seat of Blaby.

== Members of Parliament ==
South Leicestershire before 1885

| Election | Member | Party |
|---|---|---|
| 1885 | Thomas Paget | Liberal |
| 1886 | Thomas Tapling | Conservative |
| 1891 by-election | Paddy Logan | Liberal |
| 1904 by-election | Philip Stanhope | Liberal |
| 1906 | R. C. Lehmann | Liberal |
| December 1910 | Paddy Logan | Liberal |
| 1916 by-election | Percy Harris | Liberal |
| 1918 | Sir Keith Fraser | Coalition Conservative |
| 1923 | John Wycliffe Black | Liberal |
| 1924 | Lewis Winby | Conservative |
| 1929 | Arthur Stewart | Conservative |
| 1933 by-election | Ronald Tree | Conservative |
| 1945 | Humphrey Attewell | Labour |
| 1950 | John Baldock | Conservative |
| 1959 | Sir John Farr | Conservative |
| 1992 | Edward Garnier | Conservative |
| 2017 | Neil O'Brien | Conservative |

== Elections ==
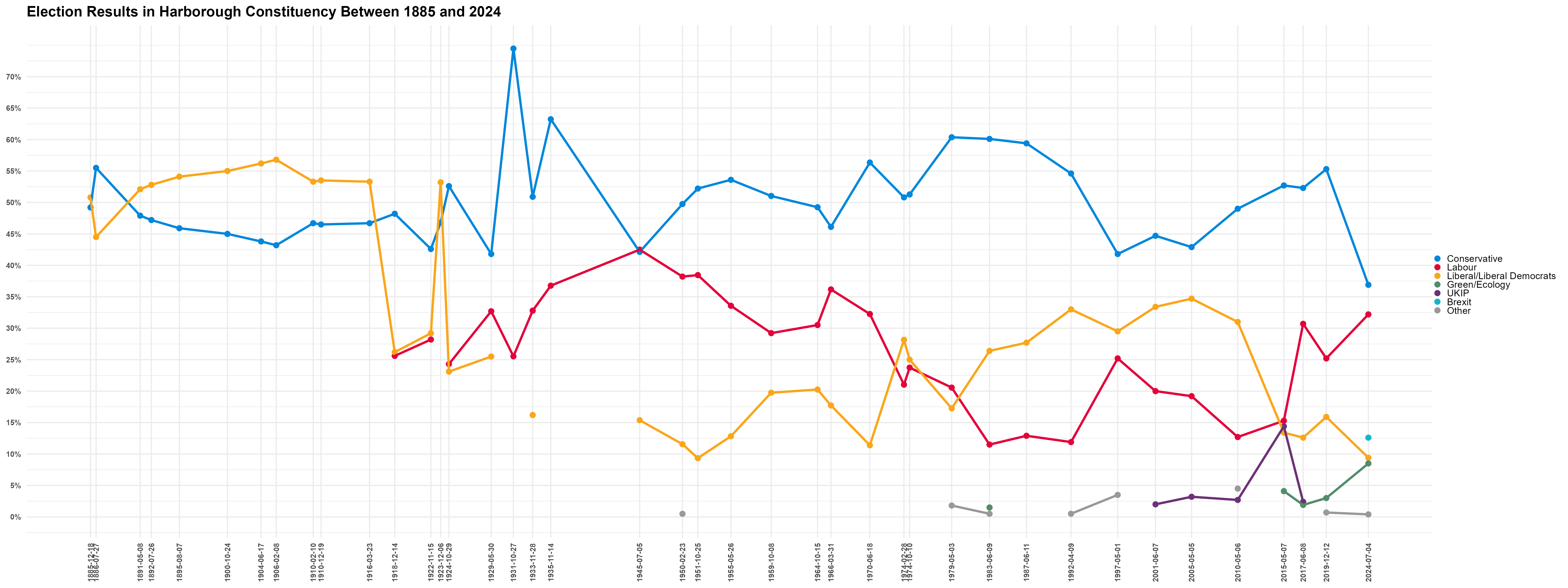
Harborough vote share as a percentage since the seat's formation in 1885.

=== Elections in the 2020s ===
General election 2024: Harborough, Oadby and Wigston
| Party | Candidate | Votes | % | ±% |
|---|---|---|---|---|
| Conservative | Neil O'Brien | 18,614 | 36.9 | −17.6 |
| Labour | Hajira Piranie | 16,236 | 32.2 | +7.4 |
| Reform | Danuta Jeeves | 6,332 | 12.6 | New |
| Liberal Democrats | Phil Knowles | 4,732 | 9.4 | −7.5 |
| Green | Darren Woodiwiss | 4,269 | 8.5 | +5.4 |
| SDP | Robin Lambert | 203 | 0.4 | New |
| Majority | | 2,378 | 4.7 | −25.4 |
| Turnout | | 50,386 | 65.6 | −5.6 |
| Registered electors | | 77,407 | | |
| Conservative hold | | Swing | −12.9 | |

=== Elections in the 2010s ===
General election 2019: Harborough
| Party | Candidate | Votes | % | ±% |
|---|---|---|---|---|
| Conservative | Neil O'Brien | 31,698 | 55.3 | +3.0 |
| Labour | Celia Hibbert | 14,420 | 25.2 | −5.5 |
| Liberal Democrats | Zuffar Haq | 9,103 | 15.9 | +3.3 |
| Green | Darren Woodiwiss | 1,709 | 3.0 | +1.1 |
| Independent | Robin Lambert | 389 | 0.7 | New |
| Majority | | 17,278 | 30.1 | +8.5 |
| Turnout | | 57,319 | 71.2 | −1.9 |
| Conservative hold | | Swing | +4.3 | |

General election 2017: Harborough
| Party | Candidate | Votes | % | ±% |
|---|---|---|---|---|
| Conservative | Neil O'Brien | 30,135 | 52.3 | −0.4 |
| Labour | Andrew Thomas | 17,706 | 30.7 | +15.4 |
| Liberal Democrats | Zuffar Haq | 7,286 | 12.6 | −0.8 |
| UKIP | Teck Khong | 1,361 | 2.4 | −12.0 |
| Green | Darren Woodiwiss | 1,110 | 1.9 | −2.2 |
| Majority | | 12,429 | 21.6 | −15.8 |
| Turnout | | 57,598 | 73.1 | +5.6 |
| Conservative hold | | Swing | −7.92 | |

General election 2015: Harborough
| Party | Candidate | Votes | % | ±% |
|---|---|---|---|---|
| Conservative | Edward Garnier | 27,675 | 52.7 | +3.7 |
| Labour | Sundip Meghani | 8,043 | 15.3 | +2.6 |
| UKIP | Mark Hunt | 7,539 | 14.4 | +11.6 |
| Liberal Democrats | Zuffar Haq | 7,037 | 13.4 | −17.7 |
| Green | Darren Woodiwiss | 2,177 | 4.1 | New |
| Majority | | 19,632 | 37.4 | +19.4 |
| Turnout | | 52,471 | 67.5 | −2.9 |
| Conservative hold | | Swing | +0.6 | |

UKIP originally selected Clive Langley, who was replaced by Mark Hunt in March 2015.

General election 2010: Harborough
| Party | Candidate | Votes | % | ±% |
|---|---|---|---|---|
| Conservative | Edward Garnier | 26,894 | 49.0 | +6.1 |
| Liberal Democrats | Zuffar Haq | 17,017 | 31.0 | −3.6 |
| Labour | Kevin McKeever | 6,981 | 12.7 | −6.6 |
| BNP | Geoff Dickens | 1,715 | 3.1 | New |
| UKIP | Marietta King | 1,462 | 2.7 | −0.5 |
| English Democrat | David Ball | 568 | 1.0 | New |
| Independent | Jeff Stephenson | 228 | 0.4 | New |
| Majority | | 9,877 | 18.0 | +9.9 |
| Turnout | | 54,865 | 70.4 | +6.3 |
| Conservative hold | | Swing | +4.85 | |

=== Elections in the 2000s ===
General election 2005: Harborough
| Party | Candidate | Votes | % | ±% |
|---|---|---|---|---|
| Conservative | Edward Garnier | 20,536 | 42.9 | −1.8 |
| Liberal Democrats | Jill Hope | 16,644 | 34.7 | +1.3 |
| Labour | Peter Evans | 9,222 | 19.2 | −0.8 |
| UKIP | Marietta King | 1,520 | 3.2 | +1.2 |
| Majority | | 3,892 | 8.2 | −3.1 |
| Turnout | | 47,922 | 64.3 | +1.0 |
| Conservative hold | | Swing | −1.6 | |

General election 2001: Harborough
| Party | Candidate | Votes | % | ±% |
|---|---|---|---|---|
| Conservative | Edward Garnier | 20,748 | 44.7 | +2.9 |
| Liberal Democrats | Jill Hope | 15,496 | 33.4 | +3.9 |
| Labour | Raj Jethwa | 9,271 | 20.0 | −5.1 |
| UKIP | David Knight | 912 | 2.0 | New |
| Majority | | 5,252 | 11.3 | −1.0 |
| Turnout | | 46,427 | 63.3 | −12.0 |
| Conservative hold | | Swing | | |

=== Elections in the 1990s ===
General election 1997: Harborough
| Party | Candidate | Votes | % | ±% |
|---|---|---|---|---|
| Conservative | Edward Garnier | 22,170 | 41.8 | −12.8 |
| Liberal Democrats | Mark Cox | 15,646 | 29.5 | −3.5 |
| Labour | Nick Holden | 13,332 | 25.2 | +12.3 |
| Referendum | Neil Wright | 1,859 | 3.5 | New |
| Majority | | 6,524 | 12.3 | −9.3 |
| Turnout | | 53,007 | 75.3 | −6.8 |
| Conservative hold | | Swing | −4.6 | |

General election 1992: Harborough
| Party | Candidate | Votes | % | ±% |
|---|---|---|---|---|
| Conservative | Edward Garnier | 34,280 | 54.6 | −4.8 |
| Liberal Democrats | Mark Cox | 20,737 | 33.0 | +5.3 |
| Labour | C Mackay | 7,483 | 11.9 | −1.0 |
| Natural Law | AP Irwin | 328 | 0.5 | New |
| Majority | | 13,543 | 21.6 | −10.1 |
| Turnout | | 62,828 | 82.1 | +2.8 |
| Conservative hold | | Swing | −5.1 | |

=== Elections in the 1980s ===
General election 1987: Harborough
| Party | Candidate | Votes | % | ±% |
|---|---|---|---|---|
| Conservative | John Farr | 35,216 | 59.4 | −0.7 |
| Liberal | Tim Swift | 16,406 | 27.7 | +1.3 |
| Labour | Philip Harley | 7,646 | 12.9 | +1.4 |
| Majority | | 18,810 | 31.7 | −2.0 |
| Turnout | | 59,268 | 79.3 | +3.4 |
| Conservative hold | | Swing | −1.0 | |

General election 1983: Harborough
| Party | Candidate | Votes | % | ±% |
|---|---|---|---|---|
| Conservative | John Farr | 32,957 | 60.1 | −0.3 |
| Liberal | Tim Swift | 14,472 | 26.4 | +9.1 |
| Labour | Martin Upham | 6,285 | 11.5 | −9.1 |
| Ecology | Brian Fewster | 802 | 1.5 | New |
| BNP | J Taylor | 280 | 0.5 | New |
| Majority | | 18,485 | 33.7 | −6.1 |
| Turnout | | 54,796 | 75.9 | −4.1 |
| Conservative hold | | Swing | −5.2 | |

=== Elections in the 1970s ===
General election 1979: Harborough
| Party | Candidate | Votes | % | ±% |
|---|---|---|---|---|
| Conservative | John Farr | 33,328 | 60.37 | |
| Labour | Peter Soulsby | 11,350 | 20.56 | |
| Liberal | P Weatherall | 9,529 | 17.26 | |
| National Front | A Ashby | 1,002 | 1.81 | New |
| Majority | | 21,978 | 39.81 | |
| Turnout | | 55,209 | 80.03 | |
| Conservative hold | | Swing | | |

General election October 1974: Harborough
| Party | Candidate | Votes | % | ±% |
|---|---|---|---|---|
| Conservative | John Farr | 25,776 | 51.27 | |
| Liberal | NG Reynolds | 12,567 | 25.00 | |
| Labour | RLW Briant | 11,934 | 23.74 | |
| Majority | | 13,209 | 26.27 | |
| Turnout | | 50,277 | 76.35 | |
| Conservative hold | | Swing | | |

General election February 1974: Harborough
| Party | Candidate | Votes | % | ±% |
|---|---|---|---|---|
| Conservative | John Farr | 27,974 | 50.81 | |
| Liberal | N Reynolds | 15,501 | 28.16 | |
| Labour | JW Robinson | 11,579 | 21.03 | |
| Majority | | 12,473 | 22.65 | |
| Turnout | | 55,054 | 84.41 | |
| Conservative hold | | Swing | | |

General election 1970: Harborough
| Party | Candidate | Votes | % | ±% |
|---|---|---|---|---|
| Conservative | John Farr | 44,933 | 56.35 | |
| Labour | Jim Marshall | 25,728 | 32.26 | |
| Liberal | Wilfrid Pickard | 9,079 | 11.39 | |
| Majority | | 19,205 | 24.09 | |
| Turnout | | 79,740 | 77.13 | |
| Conservative hold | | Swing | | |

=== Elections in the 1960s ===
General election 1966: Harborough
| Party | Candidate | Votes | % | ±% |
|---|---|---|---|---|
| Conservative | John Farr | 32,450 | 46.11 | |
| Labour | Wilfred Higgins | 25,453 | 36.17 | |
| Liberal | Jack Galloway | 12,475 | 17.73 | |
| Majority | | 6,997 | 9.94 | |
| Turnout | | 70,378 | 81.65 | |
| Conservative hold | | Swing | | |

General election 1964: Harborough
| Party | Candidate | Votes | % | ±% |
|---|---|---|---|---|
| Conservative | John Farr | 32,905 | 49.24 | |
| Labour | George Perry | 20,389 | 30.51 | |
| Liberal | Edward Rushworth | 13,533 | 20.25 | |
| Majority | | 12,516 | 18.73 | |
| Turnout | | 66,827 | 83.41 | |
| Conservative hold | | Swing | | |

=== Elections in the 1950s ===
General election 1959: Harborough
| Party | Candidate | Votes | % | ±% |
|---|---|---|---|---|
| Conservative | John Farr | 29,281 | 51.03 | |
| Labour | John Mably | 16,767 | 29.22 | |
| Liberal | Edward Rushworth | 11,333 | 19.75 | |
| Majority | | 12,514 | 21.81 | |
| Turnout | | 57,381 | 84.65 | |
| Conservative hold | | Swing | | |

General election 1955: Harborough
| Party | Candidate | Votes | % | ±% |
|---|---|---|---|---|
| Conservative | John Baldock | 27,257 | 53.60 | |
| Labour | Robert Hales | 17,073 | 33.57 | |
| Liberal | Edward Rushworth | 6,524 | 12.83 | |
| Majority | | 10,184 | 20.03 | |
| Turnout | | 50,854 | 83.34 | |
| Conservative hold | | Swing | | |

General election 1951: Harborough
| Party | Candidate | Votes | % | ±% |
|---|---|---|---|---|
| Conservative | John Baldock | 29,395 | 52.21 | |
| Labour | Christopher Boyd | 21,648 | 38.45 | |
| Liberal | Henry Bazeley | 5,258 | 9.34 | |
| Majority | | 7,747 | 13.76 | |
| Turnout | | 56,301 | 87.58 | |
| Conservative hold | | Swing | | |

General election 1950: Harborough
| Party | Candidate | Votes | % | ±% |
|---|---|---|---|---|
| Conservative | John Baldock | 27,842 | 49.75 | |
| Labour | Humphrey Attewell | 21,381 | 38.21 | |
| Liberal | Henry Bazeley | 6,467 | 11.56 | |
| Independent | NH Symington | 273 | 0.49 | New |
| Majority | | 6,461 | 11.54 | N/A |
| Turnout | | 55,963 | 89.01 | |
| Conservative gain from Labour | | Swing | | |

=== Elections in the 1940s ===
General election 1945: Harborough
| Party | Candidate | Votes | % | ±% |
|---|---|---|---|---|
| Labour | Humphrey Attewell | 23,353 | 42.50 | |
| Conservative | Ronald Tree | 23,149 | 42.13 | |
| Liberal | Wilfrid Kirby | 8,451 | 15.38 | New |
| Majority | | 204 | 0.37 | N/A |
| Turnout | | 54,953 | 75.99 | |
| Labour gain from Conservative | | Swing | | |

General Election 1939–40:

Another general election was required to take place before the end of 1940, however this did not happen due to the Second World War. The political parties had been making preparations for an election to take place from 1939 and by the end of this year, the following candidates had been selected:

- Conservative: Ronald Tree
- Labour: A E Bennett

=== Elections in the 1930s ===
General election 1935: Harborough
| Party | Candidate | Votes | % | ±% |
|---|---|---|---|---|
| Conservative | Ronald Tree | 25,308 | 63.23 | |
| Labour | Ronald McKinnon Wood | 14,718 | 36.77 | |
| Majority | | 10,590 | 26.46 | |
| Turnout | | 40,026 | 72.25 | |
| Conservative hold | | Swing | | |

1933 Harborough by-election
| Party | Candidate | Votes | % | ±% |
|---|---|---|---|---|
| Conservative | Ronald Tree | 19,320 | 50.9 | −23.6 |
| Labour | William Bennett | 12,460 | 32.8 | +7.3 |
| Liberal | W Wilson | 6,144 | 16.2 | New |
| Majority | | 6,860 | 18.1 | −30.8 |
| Turnout | | 37,924 | | |
| Conservative hold | | Swing | | |

General election 1931: Harborough
| Party | Candidate | Votes | % | ±% |
|---|---|---|---|---|
| Conservative | Arthur Stuart | 29,790 | 74.47 | |
| Labour | Frederick Wise | 10,212 | 25.53 | |
| Majority | | 19,578 | 48.94 | |
| Turnout | | 40,002 | 78.09 | |
| Conservative hold | | Swing | | |

=== Elections in the 1920s ===
General election 1929: Harborough
| Party | Candidate | Votes | % | ±% |
|---|---|---|---|---|
| Unionist | Arthur Stuart | 16,164 | 41.8 | −10.8 |
| Labour | Frederick Wise | 12,620 | 32.7 | +8.4 |
| Liberal | George Nicholls | 9,846 | 25.5 | +2.4 |
| Majority | | 3,544 | 9.1 | −19.2 |
| Turnout | | 38,630 | 81.9 | +0.9 |
| Registered electors | | 47,196 | | |
| Unionist hold | | Swing | −9.7 | |

General election 1924: Harborough
| Party | Candidate | Votes | % | ±% |
|---|---|---|---|---|
| Unionist | Lewis Phillips Winby | 13,024 | 52.6 | +5.8 |
| Labour | J. S. Hyder | 6,032 | 24.3 | New |
| Liberal | John Wycliffe Black | 5,726 | 23.1 | −30.1 |
| Majority | | 6,992 | 28.3 | N/A |
| Turnout | | 24,782 | 81.0 | +11.9 |
| Registered electors | | 30,602 | | |
| Unionist gain from Liberal | | Swing | +18.0 | |

General election 1923: Harborough
| Party | Candidate | Votes | % | ±% |
|---|---|---|---|---|
| Liberal | John Wycliffe Black | 10,841 | 53.2 | +24.0 |
| Unionist | Keith Fraser | 9,537 | 46.8 | +4.2 |
| Majority | | 1,304 | 6.4 | N/A |
| Turnout | | 20,378 | 69.1 | −7.8 |
| Registered electors | | 29,505 | | |
| Liberal gain from Unionist | | Swing | +9.9 | |

W.J. Baker

General election 1922: Harborough
| Party | Candidate | Votes | % | ±% |
|---|---|---|---|---|
| Unionist | Keith Fraser | 9,356 | 42.6 | −5.6 |
| Liberal | John Wycliffe Black | 6,427 | 29.2 | +3.0 |
| Labour | Walter Baker | 6,205 | 28.2 | +2.6 |
| Majority | | 2,929 | 13.4 | −8.6 |
| Turnout | | 21,988 | 76.9 | +13.6 |
| Registered electors | | 28,594 | | |
| Unionist hold | | Swing | −4.3 | |

=== Elections in the 1910s ===
General election 1918: Harborough
| Party | | Candidate | Votes | % | ±% |
|---|---|---|---|---|---|
| C | Unionist | Keith Fraser | 8,465 | 48.2 | +1.5 |
| | Liberal | Percy Harris | 4,608 | 26.2 | −27.1 |
| | Labour | Walter Baker | 4,495 | 25.6 | New |
| Majority | | | 3,857 | 22.0 | N/A |
| Turnout | | | 17,568 | 63.3 | −22.1 |
| Registered electors | | | 27,742 | | |
| | Unionist gain from Liberal | | Swing | +14.3 | |
C indicates candidate endorsed by the coalition government.

== Election results 1885–1918 ==
=== Elections in the 1880s ===
General election 1885: Harborough
| Party | Candidate | Votes | % | ±% |
|---|---|---|---|---|
| Liberal | Thomas Paget | 5,502 | 50.8 | |
| Conservative | Thomas Tapling | 5,336 | 49.2 | |
| Majority | | 166 | 1.6 | |
| Turnout | | 10,838 | 86.9 | |
| Registered electors | | 12,476 | | |
| Liberal win (new seat) | | | | |

Tapling

General election 1886: Harborough
| Party | Candidate | Votes | % | ±% |
|---|---|---|---|---|
| Conservative | Thomas Tapling | 5,708 | 55.5 | +6.3 |
| Liberal | James Harris Sanders | 4,570 | 44.5 | −6.3 |
| Majority | | 1,138 | 11.0 | N/A |
| Turnout | | 10,278 | 82.4 | −4.5 |
| Registered electors | | 12,476 | | |
| Conservative gain from Liberal | | Swing | +6.3 | |

=== Elections in the 1890s ===
Logan

1891 Harborough by-election
| Party | Candidate | Votes | % | ±% |
|---|---|---|---|---|
| Liberal | Paddy Logan | 5,982 | 52.1 | +7.6 |
| Conservative | Gerald Holbech Hardy | 5,493 | 47.9 | −7.6 |
| Majority | | 489 | 4.2 | N/A |
| Turnout | | 11,475 | 86.3 | +3.9 |
| Registered electors | | 13,291 | | |
| Liberal gain from Conservative | | Swing | +7.6 | |

General election 1892: Harborough
| Party | Candidate | Votes | % | ±% |
|---|---|---|---|---|
| Liberal | Paddy Logan | 6,244 | 52.8 | +8.3 |
| Conservative | Francis Lowe | 5,588 | 47.2 | −8.3 |
| Majority | | 656 | 5.6 | N/A |
| Turnout | | 11,832 | 86.5 | +4.1 |
| Registered electors | | 13,676 | | |
| Liberal gain from Conservative | | Swing | +8.3 | |

General election 1895: Harborough
| Party | Candidate | Votes | % | ±% |
|---|---|---|---|---|
| Liberal | Paddy Logan | 6,699 | 54.1 | +1.3 |
| Conservative | Cecil Powney | 5,673 | 45.9 | −1.3 |
| Majority | | 1,026 | 8.2 | +2.6 |
| Turnout | | 12,372 | 85.7 | −0.8 |
| Registered electors | | 14,440 | | |
| Liberal hold | | Swing | +1.3 | |

=== Elections in the 1900s ===
General election 1900: Harborough
| Party | Candidate | Votes | % | ±% |
|---|---|---|---|---|
| Liberal | Paddy Logan | 7,269 | 55.0 | +0.9 |
| Conservative | Charles Harvey Dixon | 5,946 | 45.0 | −0.9 |
| Majority | | 1,323 | 10.0 | +1.8 |
| Turnout | | 13,215 | 81.9 | −3.8 |
| Registered electors | | 16,128 | | |
| Liberal hold | | Swing | +0.9 | |

Stanhope

1904 Harborough by-election
| Party | Candidate | Votes | % | ±% |
|---|---|---|---|---|
| Liberal | Philip Stanhope | 7,843 | 56.2 | +1.2 |
| Conservative | Charles Harvey Dixon | 6,110 | 43.8 | −1.2 |
| Majority | | 1,733 | 12.4 | +2.4 |
| Turnout | | 13,953 | 82.9 | +1.0 |
| Registered electors | | 16,829 | | |
| Liberal hold | | Swing | +1.2 | |

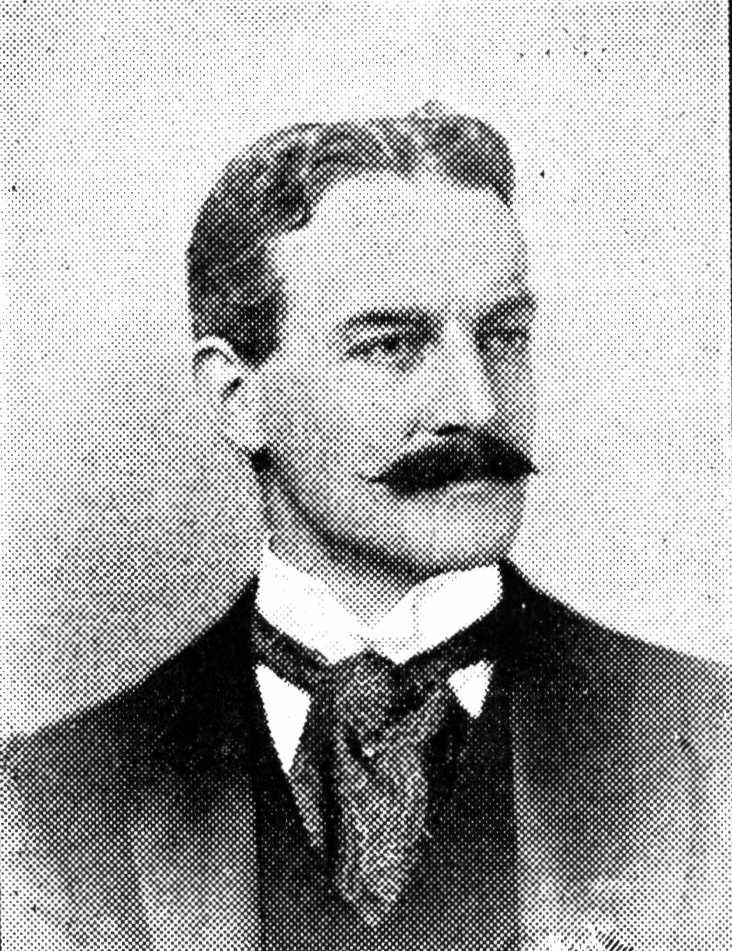
R. C. Lehmann

General election 1906: Harborough
| Party | Candidate | Votes | % | ±% |
|---|---|---|---|---|
| Liberal | R. C. Lehmann | 8,380 | 56.8 | +1.8 |
| Conservative | Charles Harvey Dixon | 6,382 | 43.2 | −1.8 |
| Majority | | 1,998 | 13.6 | +3.6 |
| Turnout | | 14,762 | 85.7 | +3.8 |
| Registered electors | | 17,227 | | |
| Liberal hold | | Swing | +1.8 | |

=== Elections in the 1910s ===
General election January 1910: Harborough
| Party | Candidate | Votes | % | ±% |
|---|---|---|---|---|
| Liberal | R. C. Lehmann | 8,632 | 53.3 | −3.5 |
| Conservative | Joseph Marshall | 7,561 | 46.7 | +3.5 |
| Majority | | 1,071 | 6.6 | −7.0 |
| Turnout | | 16,193 | 90.4 | +4.7 |
| Registered electors | | 17,921 | | |
| Liberal hold | | Swing | −3.5 | |

General election December 1910: Harborough
| Party | Candidate | Votes | % | ±% |
|---|---|---|---|---|
| Liberal | Paddy Logan | 8,192 | 53.5 | +0.2 |
| Conservative | Joseph Marshall | 7,115 | 46.5 | −0.2 |
| Majority | | 1,077 | 7.0 | +0.4 |
| Turnout | | 15,307 | 85.4 | −5.0 |
| Registered electors | | 17,921 | | |
| Liberal hold | | Swing | +0.2 | |

General Election 1914–15:

Another General Election was required to take place before the end of 1915, however this was not held due to the First World War. The political parties had been making preparations for an election to take place and by July 1914, the following candidates had been selected:

- Liberal: Percy Harris
- Conservative: Unknown

1916 Harborough by-election
| Party | Candidate | Votes | % | ±% |
|---|---|---|---|---|
| Liberal | Percy Harris | 7,826 | 67.8 | +14.3 |
| Leicestershire Attested Married Men's Protest Society | Thomas Gibson Bowles | 3,711 | 32.2 | New |
| Majority | | 4,115 | 35.6 | +28.6 |
| Turnout | | 11,537 | | |
| Liberal hold | | Swing | N/A | |

== See also ==
- List of parliamentary constituencies in Leicestershire and Rutland

== Sources ==
- Craig, F. W. S. (1983) [1969]. British parliamentary election results 1918–1949 (3rd ed.). Chichester: Parliamentary Research Services. ISBN 0-900178-06-X.
