= Neil O'Brien =

British Conservative politician

Neil O'Brien OBE MP
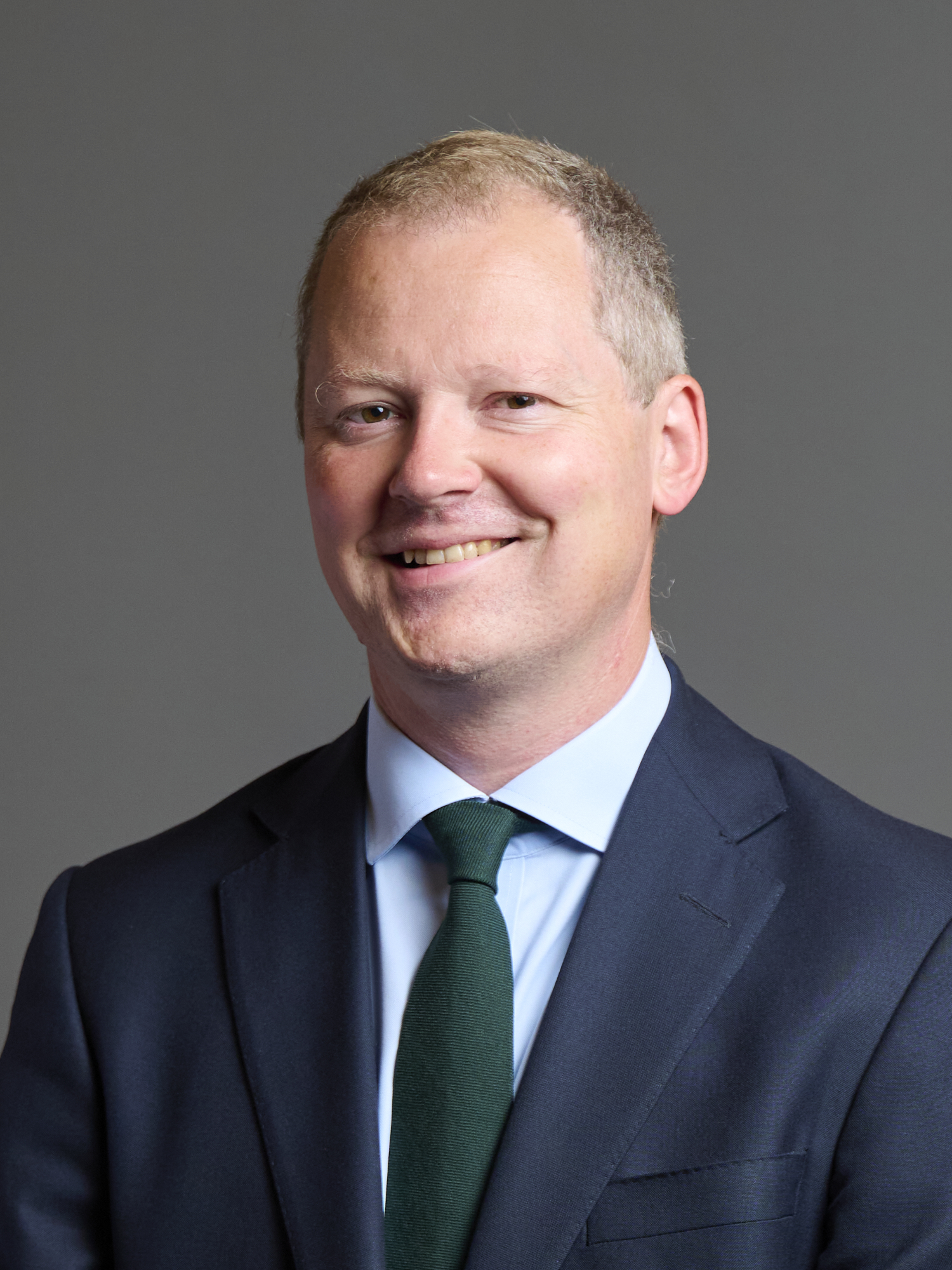
- Official portrait, 2024

Shadow Minister for Policy Renewal and Development
- Incumbent
- Assumed office 22 July 2025
- Leader: Kemi Badenoch
- Preceded by: Office established

Shadow Minister for Education
- In office 4 November 2024 – 23 July 2025
- Leader: Kemi Badenoch
- Preceded by: Gagan Mohindra
- Succeeded by: Saqib Bhatti

Parliamentary Under-Secretary of State for Primary Care and Public Health
- In office 8 September 2022 – 13 November 2023
- Prime Minister: Liz Truss; Rishi Sunak
- Preceded by: James Morris (Primary Care); Maggie Throup (Public Health)
- Succeeded by: Andrea Leadsom

Parliamentary Under-Secretary of State for Levelling Up, The Union and Constitution
- In office 17 September 2021 – 6 July 2022
- Prime Minister: Boris Johnson
- Preceded by: Office established
- Succeeded by: Lia Nici

Member of Parliament for Harborough, Oadby and Wigston Harborough (2017–2024)
- Incumbent
- Assumed office 8 June 2017
- Preceded by: Sir Edward Garnier
- Majority: 2,378 (4.7%)

Personal details
- Born: Neil John O'Brien; 6 November 1978 (age 47) Huddersfield, West Yorkshire, England
- Party: Conservative
- Education: Christ Church, Oxford (BA)
- Website: www.neilobrien.org.uk

Neil John O'Brien OBE (born 6 November 1978) is a British Conservative Party politician who has been the Member of Parliament (MP) for Harborough, Oadby and Wigston, previously Harborough, since 2017. He has served as Shadow Minister for Policy Renewal and Development since July 2025. He was the Parliamentary Under-Secretary of State for Primary Care and Public Health from September 2022 to November 2023. He was previously a special adviser to Chancellor of the Exchequer George Osborne from 2012 to 2016 and Theresa May during the first year of her tenure as Prime Minister.

== Early life and career ==
Neil O'Brien was born on 6 November 1978 in Huddersfield. He was educated at All Saints High School and Greenhead College, both in Huddersfield, before studying philosophy, politics and economics at Christ Church, Oxford. He graduated with a first-class degree. Before entering politics, O'Brien conducted outreach work with homeless people and was a chair of school governors.

Between 2000 and 2003, O'Brien worked for the 'No' campaign against Britain joining the Euro. He led the "Vote 2004" group which campaigned for a referendum on the EU's proposed constitution. Between 2005 and 2008, he was director of Open Europe, a Eurosceptic think tank. He was appointed director of the centre-right Policy Exchange in August 2008, succeeding Anthony Browne and Nick Boles in this role.

In 2009, O'Brien was ranked at number 14 in a Total Politics poll of the top 50 political influencers in Britain, named in The Daily Telegraph as one of the "Top 100 Most Influential people on the Right", described in the Sunday Times as one of the "New Political Elite" and listed in the Evening Standard as one of the "Power 1000 of London's New Influentials".

O'Brien served as a special adviser to George Osborne from November 2012 to July 2016, in relation to Osborne's role as Chancellor of the Exchequer. Subsequently, O'Brien was made a special adviser to Theresa May on the economy and industrial strategy upon her appointment as Prime Minister of the United Kingdom.

== Parliamentary career ==
O'Brien was elected as MP for the safe Conservative seat of Harborough at the 2017 general election with a majority of 12,429 and 52.3% of the vote.

In May 2018, he founded the new think tank Onward, together with Will Tanner and Nick Faith. It is chaired by Daniel Finkelstein, the Conservative peer and columnist for The Times.

Between August 2018 and July 2019, O'Brien was Parliamentary Private Secretary (PPS) to ministers at the Department for Business, Energy and Industrial Strategy. In August 2019, he was appointed as PPS to Justice Minister Robert Buckland.

At the 2019 general election, O'Brien was re-elected as MP for Harborough with an increased majority of 17,278 and 55.3% of the vote.

A co-founder of the hawkish China Research Group, on 26 March 2021, it was announced that O'Brien was one of five MPs to be sanctioned by China for spreading what it called "lies and disinformation" about the country. He was subsequently banned from entering China, Hong Kong and Macau, and Chinese citizens and institutions were prohibited from doing business with him. The sanctions were lifted on 30 January 2026 during a visit by Prime Minister Keir Starmer to China.

During the COVID-19 pandemic, O'Brien was highly critical of several commentators in the UK who were, in his opinion, playing down the impact of the virus. He was a vocal proponent of lockdowns in order to suppress the coronavirus. However, he also promoted the UK government's "Eat Out to Help Out" scheme during summer 2020, which was subsequently labelled "epidemiologically illiterate" by some epidemiologists.

During 2021, O'Brien and a number of other lockdown proponents authored a website they described as attempting to fight misinformation put out into the public debate by lockdown sceptics styling themselves as 'information warriors'.

In May 2021, O'Brien was appointed as Prime Minister Boris Johnson's adviser on levelling up the UK. He had in September 2020 produced a detailed report setting out the case for levelling up.

On 17 September 2021, O'Brien was appointed Parliamentary Under-Secretary of State at the Department for Levelling Up, Housing and Communities, during the second cabinet reshuffle of the second Johnson ministry. The role focused on the government's Levelling Up policy.

On 6 July 2022, O'Brien resigned from the government, citing a lack of confidence in the leadership of Boris Johnson. He resigned in a joint statement with Kemi Badenoch, Alex Burghart, Lee Rowley, and Julia Lopez. He later supported Badenoch in the July 2022 Conservative leadership election

On 7 September 2022, O'Brien was appointed Parliamentary Under-Secretary of State at the Department of Health and Social Care, as Minister for Social Care.

On 28 October 2022, O'Brien was re-appointed Parliamentary Under-Secretary of State at the Department of Health and Social Care, as Minister for Primary Care and Public Health.

On 13 November 2023, O'Brien resigned during the 2023 cabinet reshuffle.

Due to the 2023 Periodic Review of Westminster constituencies, O'Brien's constituency of Harborough was abolished, and replaced with Harborough, Oadby and Wigston. At the 2024 general election, O'Brien was elected to Parliament as MP for Harborough, Oadby, and Wigston with 36.9% of the vote and a majority of 2,378. In spite of his support for Badenoch in 2022, he chose to endorse Robert Jenrick in the 2024 Conservative leadership election. Despite this, upon Badenoch's victory against Jenrick, O'Brien was appointed Shadow Minister for Education. In July 2025, O'Brien was appointed Shadow Minister for Policy Renewal and Development, a new position that attends Shadow Cabinet meetings.

== Publications ==
In March 2010, O'Brien co-authored with Ross Clark a wide-ranging book called The Renewal of Government. It was praised by Michael Gove, then Shadow Secretary of State for Children, Schools and Families, and later Secretary of State for Education, who said that it "lays down with admirable clarity and form a set of radical policies ... which in the field of education I think are peerless".

In June 2018, O'Brien published a report on reforming housing and planning policy, "Green, Pleasant and Affordable". The report argued that reforms to planning law are needed to change where new homes are built, avoid piecemeal development, and ensure that developers pay more towards the costs of the infrastructure that is needed to support new development. It also proposed a new form of affordable rented housing for young people in work.

In January 2019, together with Will Tanner and Guy Miscampbell, he published a report on reform of higher education, "A Question Of Degree". It proposed that graduate repayments should be halved, with the cost of this funded by reducing the number of students on what the report called "low value" courses - courses from which graduates do not earn enough of a premium to repay the cost of their study. The BBC reported that "The Onward report urges the government to halve repayments on students loans, by introducing a tax cut for graduates worth 50p in every pound owed" and quoted O'Brien saying: "We should steer people away from courses that don't lead to good outcomes."

In May 2019, O'Brien published "Firing On All Cylinders", a wide-ranging report on economic policy which argued for a new fiscal rule, and a somewhat looser fiscal policy, to enable more investment in public services, particularly in schools and the criminal justice system. The report argued for tax reductions and radically more generous capital allowances to boost investment and tackle Britain's productivity problem. It argued for "bottom up growth" and more generous work allowances in Universal Credit to boost the incomes of low earners and increase employment. The report was praised by several of the contenders in the Conservative Party leadership race which was underway at the time the report was published.

"Small schools and village schools" were the subject of a research note published by O'Brien in July 2019. O’Brien also led a debate in Westminster Hall on the same issue in that month. In Parliament, O'Brien stated that "In 1980 there were 11,464 small primary schools with fewer than 200 pupils, but in 2018 there were just 5,406." He called for increases to the "lump sum" element within the National Funding Formula for Schools in order to support smaller schools, particularly those in rural areas.

The same month, he published a research note on prolific criminals, drawing on answers obtained from a series of Parliamentary Questions. The research note, "Super Prolific Criminals, The Case For Action", highlighted that roughly half of all crime in England and Wales is committed by just 10% of offenders. It called for a review of sentencing policy to increase prison sentences and imprisonment rates among offenders with many previous convictions who re-offend.

== Personal life ==
O'Brien lives in his Harborough constituency, and is married with two children.

Parliament of the United Kingdom
| Preceded by Sir Edward Garnier | Member of Parliament for Harborough; 2017–2024 | Constituency abolished |
| New constituency | Member of Parliament for Harborough, Oadby and Wigston; 2024–present | Incumbent |
