= Lewis Winby =

British politician & army officer (1874–1956)

Lieutenant-Colonel Lewis Phillips Winby (17 January 1874 – 27 January 1956) was the Conservative Party Member of Parliament (MP) for Harborough from 1924 to 1929.

Educated at Brighton College and Trinity College, Cambridge, where he studied engineering, Winby served in the Royal Engineers during the Second Boer War and the First World War.

== Sources ==
- Leigh Rayment's Historical List of MPs
- Whitaker's Almanack, 1925 to 1929 editions
- Craig, F.W.S. British Parliamentary Election Results
