= John Ganzoni =

John Ganzoni may refer to:

- John Ganzoni, 1st Baron Belstead, British politician and peer
- John Ganzoni, 2nd Baron Belstead, his son, British politician and peer
