= 1914 Ipswich by-election =

1914 UK parliamentary by-election

← 1910	23 May 1914	1918 →

Candidate	Ganzoni	Masterman	Scurr
Party	Unionist	Liberal	Socialist
Popular vote	6,406	5,874	395
Percentage	50.6%	46.3%	3.1%
MP before election
Horne
Liberal
Subsequent MP
Ganzoni
Unionist

The 1914 Ipswich by-election was a Parliamentary by-election held on 23 May 1914. The constituency returned two Members of Parliament (MP) to the House of Commons of the United Kingdom, elected by the first past the post voting system.

== Vacancy ==
Silvester Horne had been one of the Liberal MPs for the dual member seat of Ipswich since the January 1910 election. In 1914, returning from New York, he was taken ill suddenly and died.

== Previous result ==
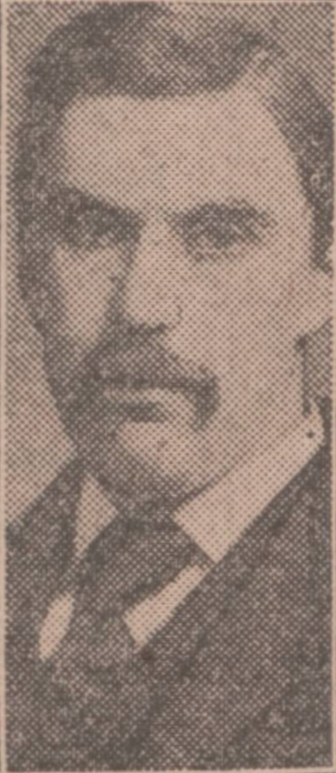
Horne

General election December 1910
Party	Candidate	Votes	%	±%
Liberal	Daniel Ford Goddard	5,931	26.2	+0.1
Liberal	Silvester Horne	5,791	25.7	+0.2
Conservative	Arthur Churchman	5,447	24.1	−0.2
Conservative	Bunnell Henry Burton	5,409	24.0	−0.1
Majority		140	0.5	
Majority		344	1.6	+0.4
Turnout		22,578	89.9	−3.4
Liberal hold		Swing	+0.2	
Liberal hold		Swing	+0.2	

In terms of a purely party vote, the votes cast for the party ticket were as follows;

General election December 1910
Party	Candidate	Votes	%	±%
Liberal	Goddard/Horne	5,757	52.0	
Conservative	Churchman/Burton	5,318	48.0	

== Candidates ==
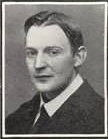
Masterman

- 41-year-old Charles Masterman was chosen as the Liberal candidate. In 1914 he was appointed to the Cabinet as Chancellor of the Duchy of Lancaster. However under the law at the time, any MP nominated as minister was legally required to recontest their seat in a by-election. Masterman lost his own seat at Bethnal Green, though this was not uncommon, and sought a return to parliament here.
- 32-year-old London Barrister John Ganzoni was chosen by the Unionists as their candidate. He had been in place long enough to effectively nurse the constituency. He claimed to have had a haircut in every Barber's Shop in Ipswich.
- 38-year-old Australian John Scurr stood as a Socialist candidate. In 1913 he was a Socialist candidate at the Chesterfield by-election. He had also stood as Socialist candidate against Masterman at Bethnal Green. Scurr was Chairman of the London District Committee of the Dock, Wharf, Riverside and General Labourers' Union.

Masterman had personal misgiving about contesting Ipswich; "It was an area of small employers, hostile to Insurance. It was a very Protestant area, reluctant about Home Rule. The local Liberals were enthusiastic and pressed hard for him to come, and Mr. Illingworth (Liberal Chief Whip) did not see how to refuse them."

== Campaign ==
The campaign was dominated by the National Insurance Act introduced by Masterman in 1911. Both the Unionist and Socialist candidates attacked the Act. On 22 May 1914 David Lloyd George a close ally of Masterman, visited the constituency to speak for the Liberal campaign. He attacked the Unionists for their behaviour over Ulster which he considered a threat to constitutional government. Unionists had given support to a possible call to arms to resist the introduction of the Liberals Irish Home Rule Bill. He also emphasised the benefits of National Insurance and Old Age Pensions.

== Result ==
This was the last contested by-election to take place before the outbreak of the Great War, after which the main political parties agreed an electoral truce.

Ganzoni

By-election 23 May 1914
Party	Candidate	Votes	%	±%
Unionist	John Ganzoni	6,406	50.6	+2.6
Liberal	Charles Masterman	5,874	46.3	−5.7
Socialist	John Scurr	395	3.1	New
Majority		532	4.3	N/A
Turnout		12,675	91.4	+1.5
Unionist gain from Liberal		Swing	+8.3	

- Change of vote share and swing calculated from the 1910 party ticket vote.

Scurr threatened that he would continue to harass Masterman by standing against him wherever he was a candidate. He never stood against Masterman again.

== Aftermath ==
Masterman's defeat forced him to resign from the Government. At the 1918 elections he unsuccessfully fought West Ham Stratford. A general election was due to take place by the end of 1915. By the autumn of 1914, the following candidates had been adopted to contest that election. Due to the outbreak of war, the election never took place.

General election 1914/15: Ipswich
Party	Candidate	Votes	%	±%
Unionist	John Ganzoni			
Liberal	Daniel Ford Goddard			

At the 1918 general election, Scurr unsuccessfully contested the Conservative Party safe seat of Buckingham. The Ipswich constituency had its representation cut from two to one member.

General election 14 December 1918: Ipswich
Party	Candidate	Votes	%	±%
Unionist	John Ganzoni	13,553	53.5	+2.9
Labour	Robert Jackson	8,143	32.1	+29.0
Liberal	George Hay Morgan	3,663	14.4	−31.9
Majority		5,410	21.4	+17.1
Turnout		25,359	67.9	−23.5
Unionist hold		Swing		

- Ganzoni was the endorsed candidate of the Coalition Government.
