= 1911 Bethnal Green South West by-election =

UK Politics

| ← Dec. 1910 | 29 July 1911 | 1914 → |

| Candidate | Masterman | Hoffgaard | Scurr |
| Party | Liberal | Conservative | Labour |
| Popular vote | 2,745 | 2,561 | 134 |
| Percentage | 50.4% | 47.1% | 2.5% |
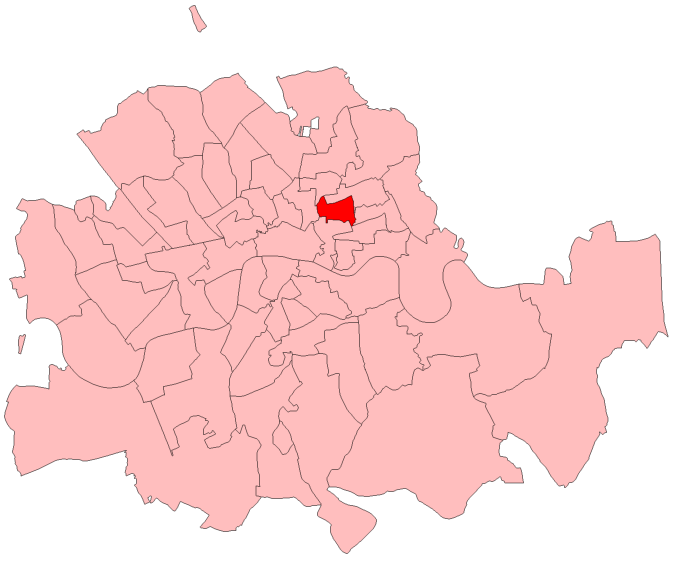
MP before election
Edward Pickersgill
Liberal
Subsequent MP
Mathew Wilson
Unionist

The 1911 Bethnal Green South West by-election was a Parliamentary by-election held on 29 July 1911. It returned one Member of Parliament (MP) to the House of Commons of the Parliament of the United Kingdom, elected by the first past the post voting system.

== Vacancy ==
Edward Pickersgill, the sitting Liberal MP for Bethnal Green South West, resigned from the House of Commons in July 1911; in order to take up a post as a stipendary magistrate.

== Electoral history ==
Pickersgill had been the MP for Bethnal Green South West since 1906, having previously represented the seat from its creation in 1885 until 1900. During the six-year period where Pickersgill did not represent the seat, it was represented by a Conservative. At the previous general election in December 1910, Pickersgill had been comfortably re-elected with a majority of 682 votes.

Pickersgill

General Election December 1910
| Party | Candidate | Votes | % | ±% |
|---|---|---|---|---|
| Liberal | Edward Pickersgill | 2,768 | 57.0 | −1.6 |
| Conservative | Eric Alfred Hoffgaard | 2,086 | 43.0 | +1.6 |
| Majority | | 682 | 14.0 | −3.2 |
| Turnout | | 4,854 | 68.3 | −11.6 |
| Liberal hold | | Swing | -1.6 | |

== Candidates ==
Following Pickersgill's re-election in December 1910, he had informed his local Liberal Association that he planned to leave politics to become a magistrate. In anticipation of Pickersgill's resignation, the local association selected Percy Harris as their candidate. Harris had previously stood as a Liberal Party candidate for parliament elsewhere on two occasions. However, he was a local man who had represented the constituency on the London County Council since 1907. Charles Masterman had been Liberal MP for West Ham North until he was forced out by the courts early in 1911 when his December 1910 victory was declared void. Despite this disruption to his parliamentary status, he had continued in the government post of Under-Secretary of State for the Home Department. During this period, he was responsible for the passage through parliament of the National Insurance Act 1911. The Liberal Party leadership was keen to get Masterman back into parliament as soon as possible. They told Pickersgill that his appointment as a magistrate was conditional upon him supporting Masterman rather than Harris as his successor. The party leadership and Pickergill put pressure on Harris to withdraw as candidate in favour of Masterman, which he did.

Eric Hoffgaard, who had been the Conservative Party candidate at the previous general election, was again selected to contest the seat. An Australian-born socialist John Scurr made it a three-way fight. When Masterman was selected as the official Liberal candidate, some of Harris' supporters decided to campaign in support of Scurr.

== Campaign ==
Polling Day was fixed for the 29 July.

== Result ==
The Liberals retained the seat with a decreased majority:

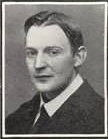
Masterman

Bethnal Green South West By-Election 1911
| Party | Candidate | Votes | % | ±% |
|---|---|---|---|---|
| Liberal | Charles Masterman | 2,745 | 50.4 | −6.6 |
| Conservative | Eric Alfred Hoffgaard | 2,561 | 47.1 | +4.1 |
| Independent Labour | John Scurr | 134 | 2.5 | New |
| Majority | | 184 | 3.3 | −10.7 |
| Turnout | | 5,440 | 76.8 | +8.5 |
| Liberal hold | | Swing | -5.3 | |

== Aftermath ==
In February 1914, Masterman was appointed Chancellor of the Duchy of Lancaster, and required to resign and fight another by-election and this time was defeated.

Bethnal Green South West By-Election 1914
| Party | Candidate | Votes | % | ±% |
|---|---|---|---|---|
| Unionist | Mathew Wilson | 2,828 | 47.6 | +0.5 |
| Liberal | Charles Masterman | 2,804 | 47.1 | −3.3 |
| Socialist | John Scurr | 316 | 5.3 | +2.8 |
| Majority | | 24 | 0.5 | N/A |
| Turnout | | 5,948 | 83.5 | +6.7 |
| Unionist gain from Liberal | | Swing | +1.9 | |
