= Sir Christopher Harris, 3rd Baronet =

New Zealand businessman (1934–2022)

Sir Christopher Harris Bt
- Born: Christopher John Ashford Harris; 26 August 1934; Wellington, New Zealand
- Died: 26 April 2022 (aged 87); Masterton, New Zealand
- Occupation: Businessman
- Spouse: Anna Karen de Malmanche (m. 1957)
- Children: 3
- Father: Jack Harris
- Relatives: Frieda Harris (grandmother); Percy Harris (grandfather); Matthew Taylor (nephew)

Sir Christopher John Ashford Harris, 3rd Baronet (26 August 1934 – 26 April 2022) was a New Zealand businessman, and the third baronet of the Harris Baronetcy of Bethnal Green, County of London, which was created for his grandfather, Percy Harris, in 1932.

== Biography ==
Born in Wellington on 26 August 1934, Harris was the son of Jack Wolfred Ashford Harris and Patricia Penman. His mother was a feminist and writer, while his father was a businessman who succeeded as the 2nd Baronet Harris, of Bethnal Green, County of London, in 1952. The baronetcy was created for Jack Harris's father, the British Liberal Party politician, Percy Harris, in 1932.

Harris was educated at Wanganui Collegiate School from 1948 to 1952. On 24 April 1957, he married Anna Karen de Malmanche, and the couple went on to have three children.

Harris joined the family business, Bing, Harris and Co., a New Zealand general importing and exporting company established in 1858 by his great-grandfather, Wolf Harris (1858–1926), and ran it for many years. He was also a director of Todd Corporation. Harris was a long-time member of the National Party, and was in charge of Stephen Franks' unsuccessful campaign for the Wellington Central at the 2008 general election. Harris was involved in the "Vote For Change" group that campaigned against the MMP voting system in the 2011 New Zealand voting system referendum.

An enthusiast of James Cook, Harris advocated, unsuccessfully, over a number of years for State Highway 1 to be renamed the Captain Cook Highway. He was active as a yachtsman, and was a member of the Royal Port Nicholson Yacht Club. He took his yacht Chinchilla out during the Wahine disaster in 1968, in an attempt to rescue survivors.

Harris died in Masterton on 26 April 2022. In 2023, his son, Andrew Frederick Ashford Harris, proved succession to the baronetcy.

Baronetage of the United Kingdom
Preceded by Jack Harris	Baronet (of Bethnal Green); 2009–2022	Succeeded by Andrew Frederick Ashford Harris
