= Bethnal Green South West (London County Council constituency) =

London County Council constituency

- Former constituency for the London County Council

Former constituency
- Created: 1889
- Abolished: 1949
- Member(s): 2
- Replaced by: Bethnal Green

Bethnal Green South West was a constituency used for elections to the London County Council between 1889 and 1949. The seat shared boundaries with the UK Parliament constituency of the same name.

== Councillors ==
Year	Name	Party	Name	Party
1889	James Branch	Progressive	Charles Harrison	Progressive
1898	James Branch	Progressive	Frank Costelloe	Progressive
1899	James Branch	Progressive	Thomas Wiles	Progressive
1907	Percy Harris	Progressive	Stewart Headlam	Progressive
1925	Percy Harris	Progressive	Ronald Jones	Progressive
1934	John Edward Anthony King	Labour	Reginald Stamp	Labour
1944	John Edward Anthony King	Communist	Reginald Stamp	Labour
1946	Percy Harris	Liberal	Edward Martell	Liberal

== Election results ==
1889 London County Council election: Bethnal Green South West
Party	Candidate	Votes	%	±%
Progressive	James Branch	2,406		
Progressive	Charles Harrison	2,366		
Moderate	Thomas Watson Francis	975		
Moderate	Alfred Ewin	835		
Independent	Isaac C. Walton	677		
Progressive win (new seat)				
Progressive win (new seat)				

1892 London County Council election: Bethnal Green South West
Party	Candidate	Votes	%	±%
Progressive	Charles Harrison	2,462		
Progressive	James Branch	2,443		
Moderate	Carlton Roberts	1,089		
Moderate	Henry Collins Gould	1,037		
Progressive hold		Swing		
Progressive hold		Swing		

1895 London County Council election: Bethnal Green South West
Party	Candidate	Votes	%	±%
Progressive	James Branch	1,765		
Progressive	Charles Harrison	1,752		
Moderate	W. A. Statham	880		
Moderate	N. J. Synnott	865		
Progressive hold		Swing		
Progressive hold		Swing		

1898 London County Council election: Bethnal Green South West
Party	Candidate	Votes	%	±%
Progressive	James Branch	2,275		
Progressive	Frank Costelloe	2,155		
Moderate	Percy Braby	1,397		
Moderate	H. H. Finch	1,374		
Independent	A. D. Jones	54		
Progressive hold		Swing		
Progressive hold		Swing		

1901 London County Council election: Bethnal Green South West
Party	Candidate	Votes	%	±%
Progressive	James Branch	2,401	32.2	
Progressive	Thomas Wiles	2,365	31.7	
Conservative	Archibald Hay	1,358	18.2	
Conservative	Frederick Joseph Coltman	1,329	17.8	
Progressive hold		Swing		
Progressive hold		Swing		

1904 London County Council election: Bethnal Green South West
Party	Candidate	Votes	%	±%
Progressive	James Branch	2,490		
Progressive	Thomas Wiles	2,458		
Conservative	J. H. Keeling	955		
Conservative	A. Maconachie	955		
Progressive hold		Swing		
Progressive hold		Swing		

1907 London County Council election: Bethnal Green South West
Party	Candidate	Votes	%	±%
Progressive	Stewart Headlam	2,995		
Progressive	Percy Harris	2,762		
Municipal Reform	F. Sebag-Montefiore	1,774		
Municipal Reform	Frank Brinsley-Harper	1,643		
Labour	J. H. Harley	512		
Majority				
Progressive hold		Swing		
Progressive hold		Swing		

1910 London County Council election: Bethnal Green South West
Party	Candidate	Votes	%	±%
Progressive	Stewart Headlam	2,684	29.0	
Progressive	Percy Harris	2,618	28.2	
Municipal Reform	Eric Alfred Hoffgaard	2,060	22.2	
Municipal Reform	Horace Alfred Medway	1,900	20.5	
Majority		558	6.0	
Progressive hold		Swing		
Progressive hold		Swing		

1913 London County Council election: Bethnal Green South West
Party	Candidate	Votes	%	±%
Progressive	Stewart Headlam	2,369	30.9	+1.9
Progressive	Percy Harris	2,359	30.8	+2.6
Municipal Reform	Malcolm Campbell-Johnston	1,487	19.4	−2.8
Municipal Reform	L. Tyfield	1,441	18.8	−1.7
Majority		872	11.4	+5.4
Progressive hold		Swing	+2.7	
Progressive hold		Swing		

1919 London County Council election: Bethnal Green South West
Party	Candidate	Votes	%	±%
Progressive	Stewart Headlam	1,599	42.0	
Progressive	Percy Harris	1,446	38.0	
Labour	Joe Vaughan	393	10.3	
Labour	H. Fitt	371	9.7	
Majority		1,053	27.6	
Progressive hold		Swing		
Progressive hold		Swing		

1922 London County Council election: Bethnal Green South West
Party	Candidate	Votes	%	±%
Progressive	Stewart Headlam	3,178		
Progressive	Percy Harris	3,049		
Labour	Joe Vaughan	2,244		
Labour	J. Valentine	2,148		
Majority				
Progressive hold		Swing		
Progressive hold		Swing		

1925 London County Council election: Bethnal Green South West
Party	Candidate	Votes	%	±%
Progressive	Percy Harris	3,675		
Progressive	Ronald Jones	3,369		
Labour	Joe Vaughan	2,569		
Labour	Sam Elsbury	2,276		
Majority				
Progressive hold		Swing		
Progressive hold		Swing		

1928 London County Council election: Bethnal Green South West
Party	Candidate	Votes	%	±%
Liberal	Percy Harris	3,753		
Liberal	Ronald Potter Jones	3,412		
Communist	Joe Vaughan	1,976		
Communist	J. King	1,829		
Labour	Skene Mackay	794		
Labour	Jack Oldfield	789		
Municipal Reform	J. A. Baker	454		
Municipal Reform	H. Malone	450		
Majority				
Liberal hold		Swing		
Liberal hold		Swing		

1931 London County Council election: Bethnal Green South West
Party	Candidate	Votes	%	±%
Liberal	Percy Harris	3,761		
Liberal	Ronald Potter Jones	3,537		
Labour	H. McNulty	2,180		
Labour	Maurice Orbach	2,104		
Majority				
Liberal hold		Swing		
Liberal hold		Swing		

1934 London County Council election: Bethnal Green South West
Party	Candidate	Votes	%	±%
Labour	John Edward Anthony King	3,202		
Labour	Reginald Stamp	3,115		
Liberal	Percy Harris	2,979		
Liberal	Ronald Potter Jones	2,824		
Communist	Joe Vaughan	617		
Communist	Dave Springhall	542		
Majority				
Labour gain from Liberal		Swing		
Labour gain from Liberal		Swing		

1937 London County Council election: Bethnal Green South West
Party	Candidate	Votes	%	±%
Labour	John Edward Anthony King	5,202		
Labour	Reginald Stamp	5,109		
Liberal	Ronald Potter Jones	3,628		
Liberal	G. T. Holmes	3,615		
Majority				
Labour hold		Swing		
Labour hold		Swing		

1946 London County Council election: Bethnal Green South West
Party	Candidate	Votes	%	±%
Liberal	Percy Harris	3,020		
Liberal	Edward Martell	2,890		
Labour	Reginald Stamp	2,093		
Labour	M. Finlay	2,060		
Majority				
Liberal gain from Labour		Swing		
Liberal gain from Labour		Swing		
