= Harborough by-election =

Harborough by-election may refer to:

- 1891 Harborough by-election
- 1904 Harborough by-election
- 1916 Harborough by-election
- 1933 Harborough by-election
