= Harris baronets =

Baronetcy in the Baronetage of the United Kingdom

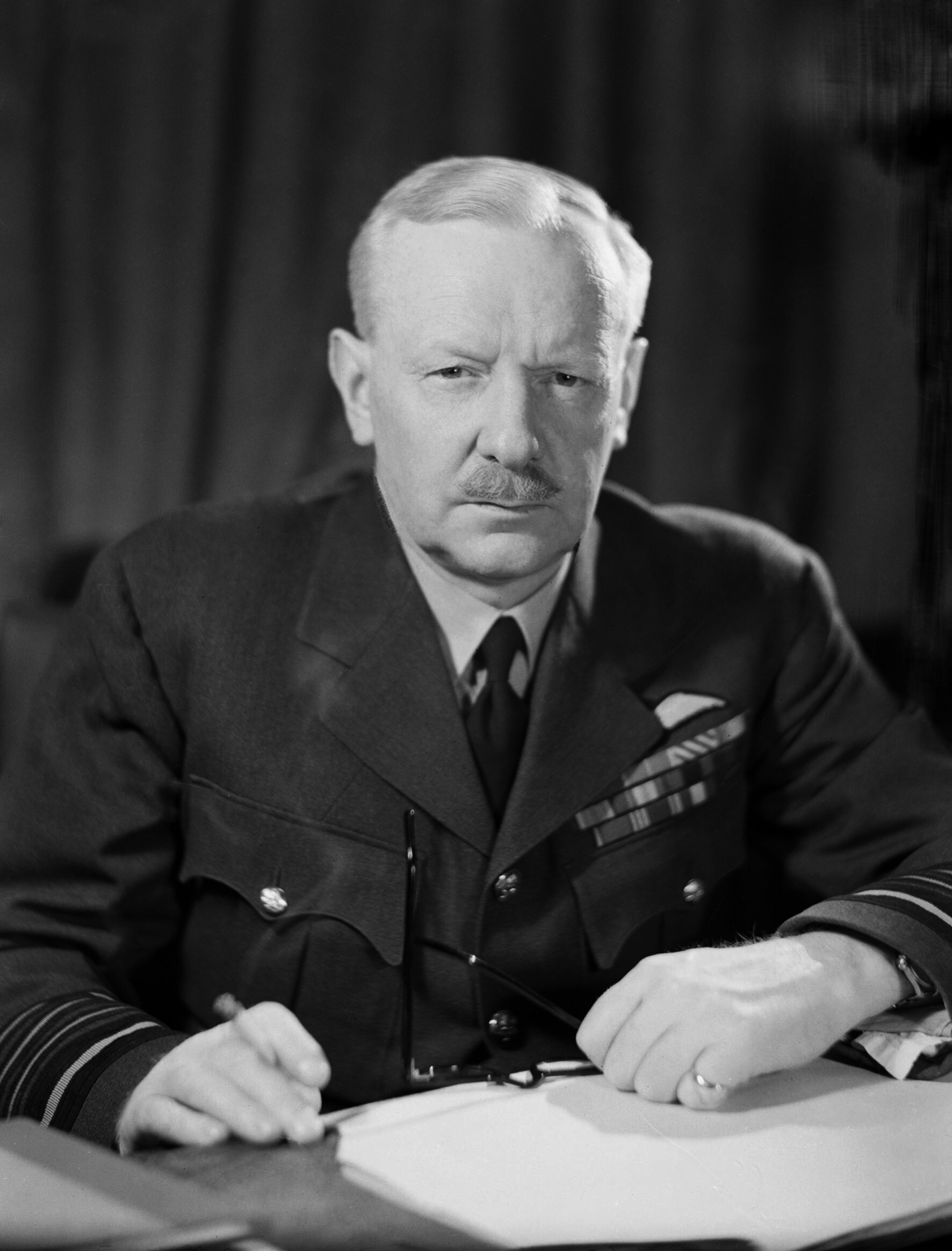
Sir Arthur Harris, 1st Baronet, of Chepping Wycombe

There have been four Baronetcies created for persons with the surname Harris, two in the Baronetage of England and two in the Baronetage of the United Kingdom. One creation is extant as of 2010.

The Harris Baronetcy, of Boreatton in the County of Shropshire, was created in the Baronetage of England on 22 December 1622 for Thomas Harris.The title became extinct on the death of the seventh Baronet in 1693.

The Harris Baronetcy, of Stowford, near Launceston, in the County of Devon, was created in the Baronetage of England on 1 December 1673 for Arthur Harris, Member of Parliament for Okehampton between 1671 and 1681. The Harris residence was at Hayne House, Stowford. The title became extinct on his death in 1686.

The Harris Baronetcy, of Bethnal Green in the County of London, was created in the Baronetage of the United Kingdom on 14 January 1932 for Percy Harris, Liberal Member of Parliament for Harborough and Bethnal Green South West.

The Harris Baronetcy, of Chepping Wycombe in the County of Buckingham, was created in the Baronetage of the United Kingdom on 24 January 1953 for the Second World War commander of RAF Bomber Command Sir Arthur Harris. He had refused a peerage in 1946. The title became extinct on the death of the second Baronet in 1996.

== Harris baronets, of Boreatton (1622) ==
- Sir Thomas Harries, 1st Baronet (died 1628)
- Sir Paul Harris, 2nd Baronet (1595–1644)
- Sir Thomas Harris, 3rd Baronet (c. 1629 – c. 1661)
- Sir George Harris, 4th Baronet (1631 – c.1664)
- Sir Paul Harris, 5th Baronet (1634–1666)
- Sir Roger Harris, 6th Baronet (1601–1685)
- Sir Robert Harris, 7th Baronet (1612–1693)

== Harris baronets, of Stowford (1673) ==
- Sir Arthur Harris, 1st Baronet (c. 1650 – 1686)

== Harris baronets, of Bethnal Green (1932) ==
- Sir Percy Alfred Harris, 1st Baronet (1876–1952)
- Sir Jack Wolfred Ashford Harris, 2nd Baronet (1906–2009)
- Sir Christopher John Ashford Harris, 3rd Baronet (1934–2022)
- Sir Andrew Frederick Ashford Harris, 4th Baronet (born 1958)

The heir presumptive is the present holder's cousin Paul Percy Ashford Harris (born 1945). The heir presumptive's heir apparent is his son Mark Percy Harris (born 1970).

== Harris baronets, of Chepping Wycombe (1953) ==
- Sir Arthur Travers Harris, 1st Baronet (1892–1984)
- Sir Anthony Kyrle Travers Harris, 2nd Baronet (1918–1996)

== See also ==
- Earl of Malmesbury, a title belonging to bearers of the name Harris
- Viscount FitzHarris, a subsidiary title of the above
