= Sir Percy Harris, 1st Baronet =

British politician (1876–1952)

The Right Honourable Sir Percy Alfred Harris Bt., PC
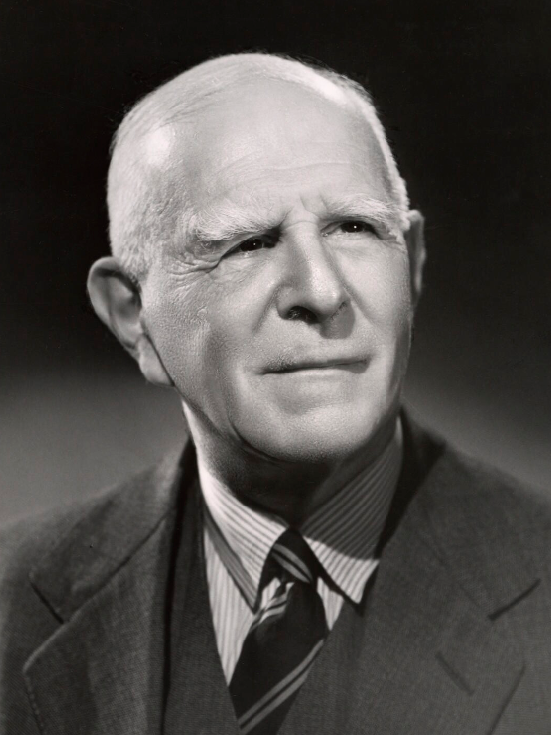
- Sir Percy Harris in 1946

Deputy Leader of the Liberal Party
- In office May 1940 – 26 July 1945
- Leader: Archibald Sinclair
- Preceded by: Francis Dyke Acland (1939)
- Succeeded by: Megan Lloyd George (1949)

Liberal Chief Whip
- In office 27 November 1935 – 26 July 1945
- Leader: Archibald Sinclair
- Preceded by: Walter Rea
- Succeeded by: Tom Horabin

Member of Parliament for Bethnal Green South West
- In office 15 November 1922 – 26 July 1945
- Preceded by: Sir Matthew Wilson
- Succeeded by: Percy Holman

Member of Parliament for Harborough
- In office 23 March 1916 – 14 December 1918
- Preceded by: Paddy Logan
- Succeeded by: Keith Fraser

Personal details
- Born: 6 March 1876 Kensington, London, England
- Died: 28 June 1952 (aged 76)
- Party: Liberal Party
- Spouse: Marguerite Frieda Bloxam (m. 1901–1952)
- Children: 2
- Parent: Wolf Harris (father)
- Relatives: Jack Harris (son)
- Education: Harrow School
- Alma mater: Trinity Hall, Cambridge

Sir Percy Alfred Harris, 1st Baronet, PC (6 March 1876 – 28 June 1952) was a British Liberal Party politician. He was Liberal Chief Whip and Deputy Leader of the Liberal Parliamentary Party.

== Political positions ==
Percy Harris was regarded as a radical Liberal with a strong social conscience, which grew from representing a working-class area of the East End of London. He was particularly interested in the issue of social housing, a major responsibility of the London County Council. Harris sided with H. H. Asquith against David Lloyd George in 1918–23. Thereafter, he sought unity within the Liberal Party. When the Liberal Party split in 1931 over the issue of free trade, he sided with Sir Herbert Samuel and against the Liberal National breakaway led by Sir John Simon. Under the leadership of Sir Archie Sinclair, he rose to prominence in the party. Harris was a strong supporter of the social policies advocated by Sir William Beveridge and was key to getting Beveridge to run for the Liberals.

== Background ==
Harris was born in Kensington, the second son of Wolf Harris (1833–1926), a Polish immigrant. He was educated at Harrow and Trinity Hall, Cambridge. Harris was called to the bar by Middle Temple in 1899. In 1901 he married occultist Marguerite Frieda Bloxam (1877–1962). They had two sons including Jack Harris (23 July 1906 – 26 August 2009). A great-grandson is the former Liberal Democrat Member of Parliament Matthew Taylor—which Taylor, who was adopted, discovered in 2008.

== Political career ==
Harris first stood for election at the 1906 general election when he was the Liberal candidate for the Ashford Division of Kent. Ashford was a safe Conservative seat that they had won at every election since the seat was created in 1885. He was not expected to win and in an election that saw the Liberals sweep the country Harris came within 400 votes of toppling his Conservative opponent.

Harris next contested the 1907 London County Council election for the Progressive Party, the municipal wing of the Liberal Party. He contested Bethnal Green South West alongside his running mate Stewart Headlam and they were both elected.

In 1910, Harris contested the January 1910 general election as Liberal candidate for the Harrow division of Middlesex. Harrow was a safe Conservative seat that had been unexpectedly won by the Liberal James Gibb in 1906. Gibb had decided to retire and Harris was given the hard task of defending the seat. Harris had attended school in Harrow so knew the area a little. In a tougher year for the Liberals, Harrow was retaken by the Conservatives.

Harris did not contest the December 1910 general election. When the Liberal MP for Bethnal Green South West resigned his seat in 1911, Harris was keen to win the Liberal nomination for the 1911 Bethnal Green South West by-election, however, he withdrew in favour of Charles Masterman. He then focused on his duties at the London County Council. In 1912, Harris was appointed as the Chief Whip for the Progressives. He retained his seat on the London County Council until 1934. Harris's London and its Government (1913) was the standard work on metropolitan municipal government.

=== Harborough ===
In 1914, Harris was adopted as prospective Liberal candidate for the Harborough division of Leicestershire for the general election expected to take place either in 1914 or 1915. Harborough was a Liberal seat where the elderly sitting member had decided to retire at the next election. However, the outbreak of war postponed the general election. In 1915, Harris was elected Deputy Chairman of the London County Council. In the meantime, the health of the Liberal MP for Harborough deteriorated and he resigned from parliament causing the 1916 Harborough by-election. Harris was readopted by the local Liberals and his candidacy was also officially endorsed by both the Unionist and Labour parties, due to the wartime electoral truce. However, Harris faced a strong opponent in the by-election who received much Unionist support as well as strong support from prominent newspaper barons. Despite this, Harris was elected to Parliament. In May 1918, when H. H. Asquith challenged Prime Minister David Lloyd George in the Maurice Debate, Harris sided with Asquith and went into the division lobby against the Coalition Government. As a result, he lost his seat at the 1918 general election when his Unionist opponent was endorsed by the Coalition Government. In 1919, Harris was engaged in correspondence with John Wycliffe Black, Chairman of the Harborough Divisional Liberal Association, about the amount of money Harris was expected to contribute if he wished to remain as Parliamentary candidate. In the end Harris was not able to meet the requirements of the divisional Liberal association and sought another constituency. Black was then adopted by Harborough Liberals as their candidate.

=== Bethnal Green South West ===
The split with the Harborough Liberals gave Harris the freedom to pursue a parliamentary career in Bethnal Green South West, the seat he represented on the LCC. The parliamentary seat had a chequered history; the Liberals had won the seat on eight occasions but had lost it three times. At the last election in 1918, the Liberal candidate had finished third with just 24%, behind a socialist candidate supported by the National Federation of Discharged and Demobilized Sailors and Soldiers. At the 1922 general election, Harris faced the Unionist MP who had taken the seat from the Liberals in 1914 and a Communist who had Labour Party support. The sitting Unionist member finished third and Harris regained the seat polling over 40% of the vote. Harris repeated his victory in 1923 when his Communist opponent ran as an official Labour Party candidate and in 1924 when that opponent once more ran as a Communist. The 1924 election was a very bad election for the Liberals nationwide but Harris's support had held up very well. During the 1924–29 parliament which was dominated by a Unionist majority, Harris worked closely with a group of radical Liberal MPs that included William Wedgwood Benn, Frank Briant, Joseph Kenworthy and Horace Crawfurd to provide opposition to the government. Harris avoided getting involved in the Liberal Party in-fighting of the time and supported the radical policy platforms of the party presented under Lloyd George's leadership. At the 1929 general election he was easily returned, thanks in part to both the Communist and Labour parties running candidates.

=== National Government ===
When the Liberal Party split in 1931 over the National Government, Harris supported Sir Herbert Samuel who wanted the party to stay in the National Government and fight strongly for Free Trade. At the 1931 general election, the Conservatives, who had come fourth in 1929, did not bother to run a candidate against him. Harris was re-elected with nearly 60% of the vote against an opposition split between Labour and Communist. On 14 January 1932, Harris was created a Baronet, as Sir Percy Harris of London. When the Liberal Party left the National Government following the defeat on Free Trade, Harris followed into opposition. At the 1935 general election, he faced just one opponent, a Labour Party candidate who was also opposed to the National Government. Harris held his seat with a reduced majority in a tough election for the Liberals which saw their Leader, Sir Herbert Samuel, lose his seat. In 1935, the new Liberal Leader Sir Archie Sinclair appointed Sir Percy Liberal Chief Whip in succession to Walter Rea, who had also lost his seat at the recent general election.

=== Wartime Government ===
In 1940, when Liberal Leader Sir Archie Sinclair took up a cabinet position in the Churchill Coalition Government he appointed Harris as Deputy Leader of the Liberal Parliamentary Party in addition to being Chief Whip. The deputy position had been vacant since Sinclair had become leader in 1935. At the same time Harris was appointed a Privy Counsellor. On his shoulders fell much of the responsibility of leading the party in the Commons and in organising the party in the country. The Liberal Party was invigorated by the recruitment to its ranks of Sir William Beveridge, author of the Beveridge Report and optimistically met the electorate at the 1945 general election. However, the election was a disappointment for the party and particularly for Harris who lost his seat in the Labour Party tide.

=== Latter years ===
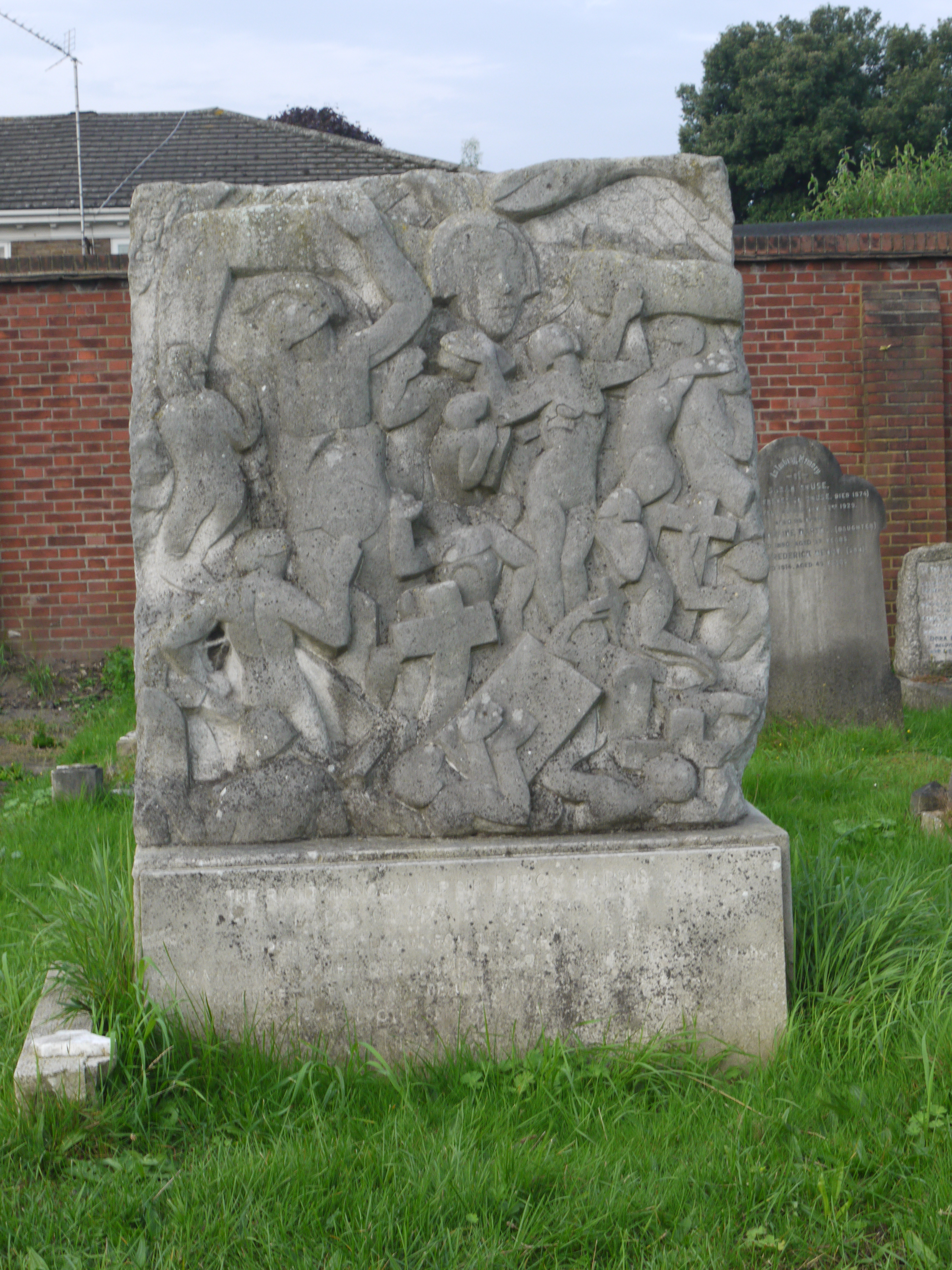
Sir Percy Harris's tombstone in Chiswick

In 1946 Harris published his autobiography, Forty Years In and Out of Parliament. After the loss of his parliamentary seat, he remained politically active and won his old London County Council seat back from the Labour Party in 1946. Harris played a key role in the formation of Liberal International in 1947 and was President of the British Council of LI. He was re-elected in the 1949 London County Council Elections, but found himself to be the only Liberal on the Council and briefly holding the balance of power between Labour and Conservative. In 1950, Harris sought a similar return to parliament for the new merged seat of Bethnal Green, but in a bad year for the Liberals, finished a distant second.

Harris died in Kensington aged 76 in 1952. His monument in the churchyard of St Nicholas Church, Chiswick is Grade II* listed. The relief carving by Edward Bainbridge Copnall depicts the resurrection of the dead. It was carved in the late 1920s and acquired by Harris for display in his garden at Morton House, Chiswick Mall.

=== Electoral record ===
1906 general election: Ashford
Party	Candidate	Votes	%	±%
Conservative	Laurence Hardy	5,994	51.6	
Liberal	Percy Harris	5,614	48.4	
Majority		380	3.2	
Turnout			83.7	
Conservative hold		Swing		

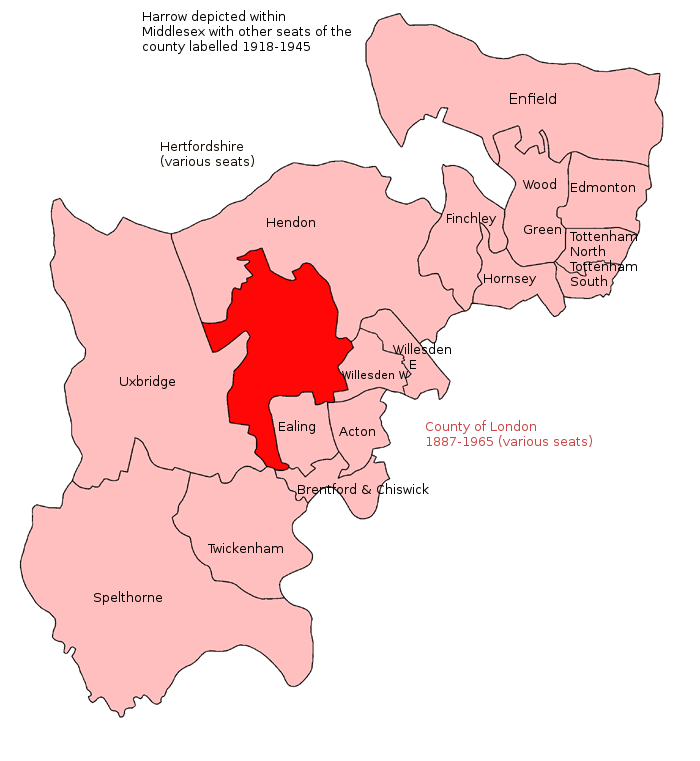
Harrow in Middlesex 1910

January 1910 general election: Harrow
Party	Candidate	Votes	%	±%
Conservative	Harry Mallaby-Deeley	16,761	55.3	+6.2
Liberal	Percy Harris	13,575	44.7	−6.2
Majority		3,186	10.6	12.4
Turnout			85.7	
Conservative gain from Liberal		Swing	+6.2	

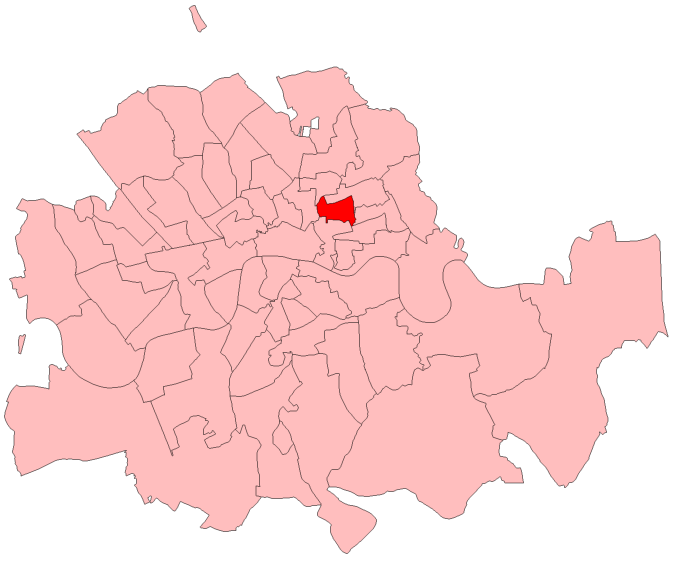
Bethnal Green South West in London 1885–1918

London County Council election, 1910: Bethnal Green South West
Party	Candidate	Votes	%	±%
Progressive	✓ Stewart Headlam	2,684	29.0	
Progressive	✓ Percy Harris	2,618	28.2	
Municipal Reform	Eric Alfred Hoffgaard	2,060	22.2	
Municipal Reform	H A Meadway	1,900	20.5	
Majority		558	6.0	
Progressive hold		Swing		
Progressive hold		Swing		

London County Council election, 1913: Bethnal Green South West
Party	Candidate	Votes	%	±%
Progressive	✓ Stewart Headlam	2,369	30.9	+1.9
Progressive	✓ Percy Harris	2,359	30.8	+2.6
Municipal Reform	Malcolm Campbell-Johnston	1,487	19.4	−2.8
Municipal Reform	L Tyfield	1,441	18.8	−1.7
Majority		872	11.4	+5.4
Progressive hold		Swing	+2.7	

1916 Harborough by-election
Party	Candidate	Votes	%	±%
Liberal	Percy Harris	7,826	67.8	
Independent	Thomas Gibson Bowles	3,711	32.2	n/a
Majority		4,115	35.6	
Turnout				
Liberal hold		Swing	n/a	

1918 general election
Party	Candidate	Votes	%	±%
Unionist	Keith Fraser	8,465	48.2	
Liberal	Percy Harris	4,608	26.2	
Labour	Walter Baker	4,495	25.6	n/a
Majority		3,857	22.0	
Turnout			63.3	
Unionist gain from Liberal		Swing		

London County Council election, 1919: Bethnal Green South West
Party	Candidate	Votes	%	±%
Progressive	✓ Stewart Headlam	1,599	42.0	
Progressive	✓ Percy Harris	1,446	38.0	
Labour	Joe Vaughan	393	10.3	
Labour	H. Fitt	371	9.7	
Majority		1,053	27.6	
Progressive hold		Swing		

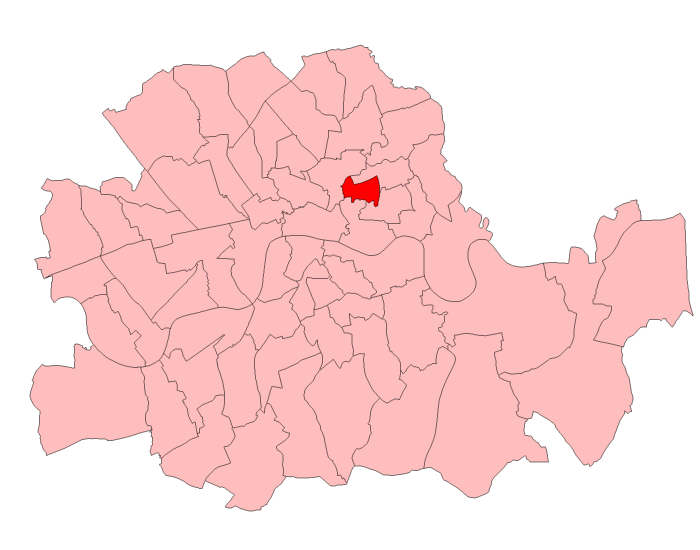
Bethnal Green South West in London 1918–50

1922 general election: Bethnal Green South West
Party	Candidate	Votes	%	±%
Liberal	Percy Harris	5,152	40.7	+12.3
Communist	Joe Vaughan	4,034	31.9	n/a
Unionist	Mathew Wilson	3,474	27.4	−24.9
Majority		1,118	8.8	37.2
Turnout		21,129	59.9	+18.3
Liberal gain from Unionist		Swing	n/a	

1923 general election: Bethnal Green South West
Party	Candidate	Votes	%	±%
Liberal	Percy Harris	5,735	43.3	+2.6
Labour	Joe Vaughan	5,251	39.6	+7.7
Unionist	John Leigh	2,267	17.1	−10.3
Majority		484	3.7	−5.1
Turnout		21,320	62.2	+2.3
Liberal hold		Swing	-2.5	

1924 general election: Bethnal Green South West
Party	Candidate	Votes	%	±%
Liberal	Percy Harris	6,236	42.3	−1.0
Communist	Joe Vaughan	6,024	40.9	+1.3
Unionist	C.P. Norman	2,467	16.8	−0.3
Majority		212	1.4	−2.3
Turnout		21,522	68.4	+6.2
Liberal hold		Swing	-1.1	

1929 general election: Bethnal Green South West
Party	Candidate	Votes	%	±%
Liberal	Percy Harris	8,109	45.9	+3.6
Labour	Christopher John Kelly	6,849	38.7	n/a
Communist	Robert Dunstan	1,368	7.7	−33.2
Unionist	Herbert John Malone	1,365	7.7	−9.1
Majority		1,260	7.2	+5.8
Turnout		27,895	64.1	−4.3
Liberal hold		Swing	n/a	

1931 general election: Bethnal Green South West
Party	Candidate	Votes	%	±%
Liberal	Percy Harris	10,176	59.6	+13.7
Labour	W.J. Humphreys	3,923	23.0	−14.3
Communist	Joe Vaughan	2,970	17.4	+9.7
Majority		6,253	36.6	+29.4
Turnout		27,895	61.2	−2.9
Liberal hold		Swing	+14.0	

1935 general election: Bethnal Green South West
Party	Candidate	Votes	%	±%
Liberal	Percy Harris	9,011	53.1	−6.5
Labour	George Jeger	7,945	46.9	+23.9
Majority		1,066	6.2	−30.4
Turnout		27,484	61.7	+0.5
Liberal hold		Swing	-15.2	

1945 general election: Bethnal Green South West
Party	Candidate	Votes	%	±%
Labour Co-op	Percy Holman	6,669	57.3	10.4
Liberal	Percy Harris	4,213	36.2	−16.9
National Liberal	O. Howard Leicester	750	6.5	n/a
Majority		2,456	21.1	27.3
Labour gain from Liberal		Swing	+13.6	

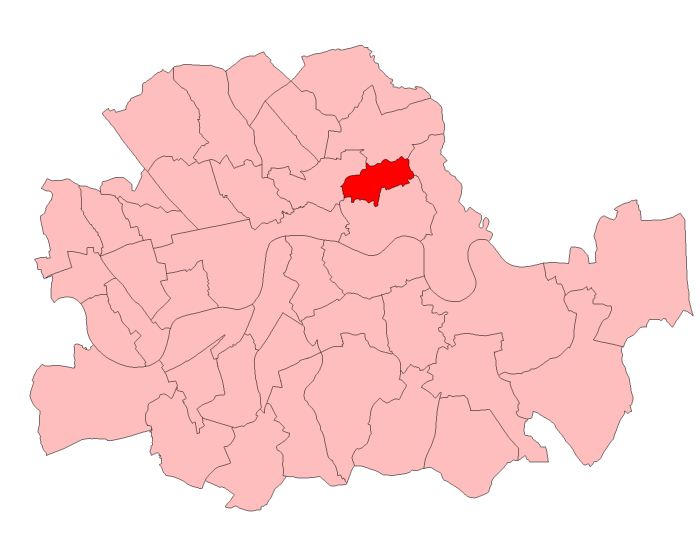
Bethnal Green in London 1950

1950 general election: Bethnal Green
Party	Candidate	Votes	%	±%
Labour	Percy Holman	20,519	63.3	n/a
Liberal	Percy Harris	9,715	30.0	n/a
Conservative	Dorothy E. Welfare	1,582	4.9	n/a
Communist	Jeffrey J. Mildwater	610	1.9	n/a
Majority		10,804	33.3	n/a
Turnout		31,816	76.9	n/a
Labour win				

== Bibliography ==
- Oxford Dictionary of National Biography
- Obituary, Jewish Chronicle, 4 July 1952

Parliament of the United Kingdom
Preceded by Paddy Logan	Member of Parliament for Harborough; 1916 – 1918	Succeeded by Sir Keith Fraser
Preceded by Sir Mathew Wilson	Member of Parliament for Bethnal Green South West; 1922 – 1945	Succeeded by Percy Holman
Party political offices
Preceded by Walter Rea	Liberal Chief Whip; 1935–1945	Succeeded by Tom Horabin
Vacant Title last held by Francis Dyke Acland	Deputy Leader of the Liberal Party; 1940–1945	Vacant Title next held by Megan Lloyd George
Baronetage of the United Kingdom
New title	Baronet (of London); 1932–1952	Succeeded by Jack Harris
