= Lord Rochester =

Lord Rochester may refer to:

- Earl of Rochester
  - Henry Wilmot, 1st Earl of Rochester (1612–1658), English soldier
  - John Wilmot, 2nd Earl of Rochester (1647–1680), English poet and courtier
  - Laurence Hyde, 1st Earl of Rochester (1642–1711), English statesman, uncle of Queen Anne
  - Henry Hyde, 4th Earl of Clarendon, 2nd Earl of Rochester (1672–1753), English politician
- Viscount Rochester
- Baron Rochester
