= Daniel Ford Goddard =

British politician

Goddard circa 1916

Rt Hon. Sir Daniel Ford Goddard PC JP (17 January 1850 – 6 May 1922) was a British civil engineer, businessman and Liberal Party politician who served as a Member of Parliament (MP) for Ipswich from 1895 to 1918. He was also Mayor of Ipswich from 1891 to 1892.

== Background ==
Goddard was the son of Ebenezer Goddard, C.E., J.P., of Ipswich, Suffolk, and his wife Annie, née Ford. He was educated privately at Ipswich and then at Hastings under Dr Martin Reed. He married Lucy Corsbie in 1874. She died in 1875, and in 1877 he married Elizabeth Harwood. Both his father and grandfather occupied the post of engineer for the Ipswich Gas Company.

== Professional career ==
In 1867 Goddard was articled to Messrs E. R. and J. Turner, engineers, Ipswich. He was an associate member of the Institution of Civil Engineers. He studied Chemistry with Professors Sibson and Heisch in London and Newcastle. He worked as an Assistant Engineer from 1872 to 1877 and then succeeded his father as Engineer and Secretary of the Ipswich Gas Company from 1877 to 1887. He was a director of several companies. He was Chairman of Directors for the Ipswich Gas Company from 1887. In 1896 he founded and built the Ipswich Social Settlement.

== Political career ==
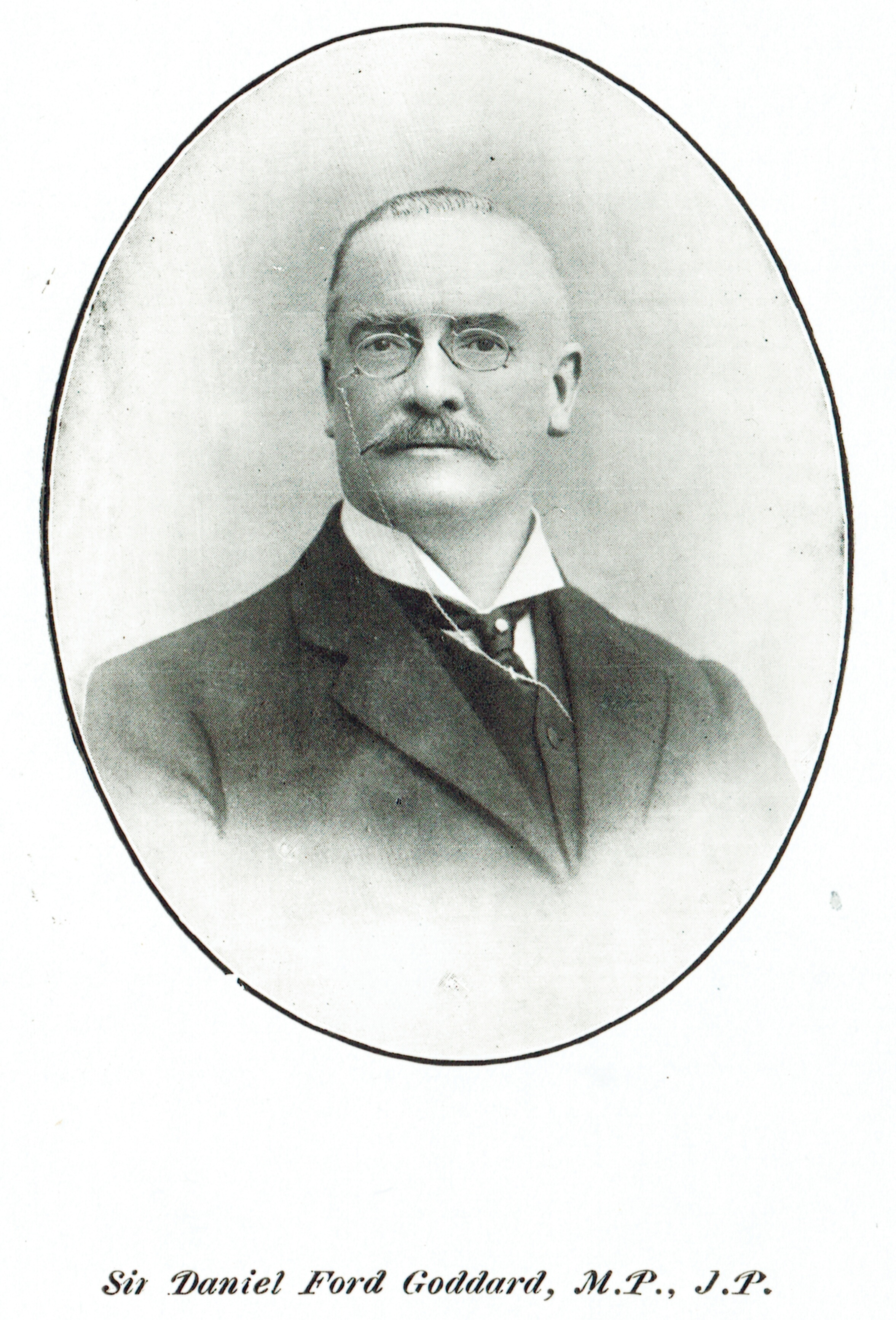
Sir Daniel Ford Goddard c.1911

Goddard was first elected to Ipswich Borough Council in 1886 serving until 1895. He was appointed an alderman of Ipswich in 1895, and served as the town's mayor from 1891 to 1892. In 1892 he was appointed as a Justice of the peace for Ipswich.

At the 1892 general election, he stood for Parliament as one of two Liberal candidates in the dual member constituency of Ipswich. He stood in tandem with Arthur Soames. The Liberals had not won Ipswich since 1885. They failed to dislodge either of Ipswich's two Conservative MPs. He won the seat in 1895.

Unsurprisingly, as a local man and former city mayor, Goddard polled 167 votes more than his running mate, Soames. Three years later, Goddard and Soames had another opportunity to unseat the Conservatives at the 1895 general election. Goddard was successful, topping the poll, but Soames was third, 43 votes behind the leading Conservative. At the 1900 general election, Goddard sought re-election and this time had a new Liberal running mate in Noel Buxton. Goddard again topped the poll but again, the sitting Conservative MP came second ahead of Buxton. For the 1906 general election, Goddard stood again as Liberal candidate and again with a new Liberal running mate in Felix Cobbold. Unlike Soames and Buxton, Cobbold had stronger ties to Ipswich, making him a better fit as candidate. Goddard and Cobbold were both easily elected in the year of the Liberal landslide. Once again, Goddard topped the poll. In 1907 Dod's Parliamentary Companion described him as being in favour of electoral reform, poor law reform, licensing reform, the disestablishment of the State Church in Wales and the abolition of the House of Lords veto.

Goddard was knighted on 16 December 1907

His Ipswich colleague Felix Cobbold died in December 1909 just weeks before the January 1910 general election. The Liberals selected Silvester Horne to run with Goddard at the election. Both seats were retained with Goddard at the top of the poll. The two repeated their January 1910 election victory at the general election of December 1910, with Goddard topping the poll.

In 1914, Silvester Horne died suddenly causing a vacancy. The 1914 Ipswich by-election was set to elect his replacement. The Liberals chose government minister Charles Masterman as candidate. Masterman, who had no connection with Ipswich, had lost his seat earlier in the year and was in a hurry to get back into parliament. However, the by-election went badly for the Liberals and a Unionist won the seat.

Sir Daniel Ford Goddard, shortly before his death

Another general election was required to take place before the end of 1915. He had been re=selected to run again as Liberal candidate for Ipswich. However, due to the outbreak of war in 1914, the election was deferred. He was sworn in as a Privy Councillor on 27 Jan 1916.

He continued as an MP until the 1918 general election, when Ipswich's parliamentary representation was reduced to one seat and he did not seek re-election. Although only 68, he did not stand for parliament again, and died four years later.

=== Electoral record ===
General election 1892: Ipswich
Party	Candidate	Votes	%	±%
Conservative	Charles Dalrymple	4,350	26.2	−0.4
Conservative	Hugo Charteris	4,277	25.8	−0.9
Liberal	Daniel Ford Goddard	4,054	24.5	+1.0
Liberal	Arthur Wellesley Soames	3,888	23.5	+0.3
Turnout		8,417 (est)	89.7	+7.9
Registered electors		9,619		
Majority		223	1.3	−1.8
Conservative hold		Swing	-0.7	
Conservative hold		Swing	-0.6	

Goddard in 1895

General election 1895: Ipswich
Party	Candidate	Votes	%	±%
Liberal	Daniel Ford Goddard	4,396	25.6	+1.1
Conservative	Charles Dalrymple	4,293	25.0	−1.2
Liberal	Arthur Wellesley Soames	4,250	24.8	+1.3
Conservative	Hugo Charteris	4,219	24.6	−1.2
Turnout		8,696 (est)	90.4	+0.7
Registered electors		9,619		
Majority		177	1.0	n/a
Liberal gain from Conservative		Swing	+1.2	
Majority		43	0.2	−1.1
Conservative hold		Swing	-1.3	

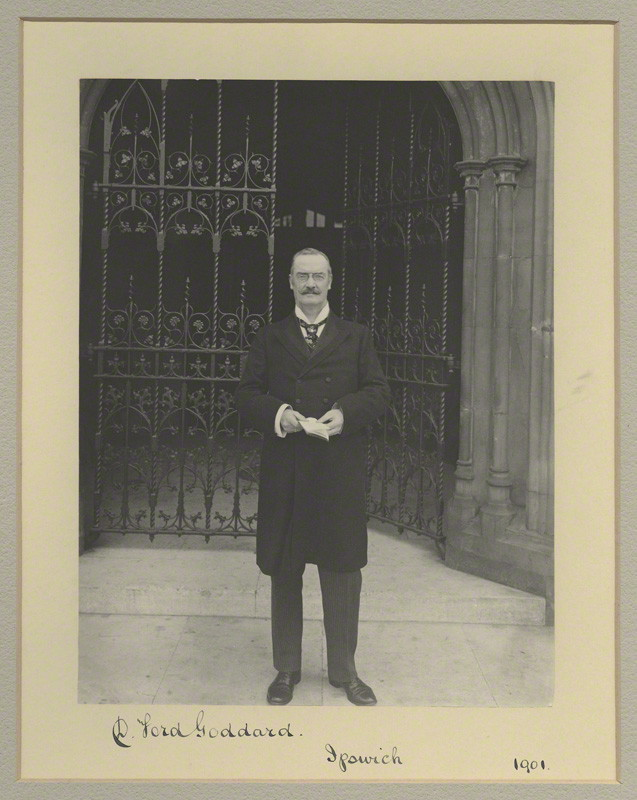
Goddard in 1901 at entrance to parliament

General election 1900: Ipswich
Party	Candidate	Votes	%	±%
Liberal	Daniel Ford Goddard	4,557	25.9	+0.3
Conservative	Charles Dalrymple	4,527	25.8	+0.8
Liberal	Noel Buxton	4,283	24.4	−0.4
Conservative	J. F. P. Rawlinson	4,207	23.9	−0.7
Turnout			83.6	−6.8
Registered electors		10,646		
Majority		350	2.0	+1.0
Liberal hold		Swing	-0.5	
Majority		244	1.4	+1.2
Conservative hold		Swing	+0.6	

Cobbold & Goddard 1906 postcard

General election 1906: Ipswich
Party	Candidate	Votes	%	±%
Liberal	Daniel Ford Goddard	6,396	29.8	+3.9
Liberal	Felix Cobbold	6,290	29.2	+3.8
Conservative	Charles Dalrymple	4,591	21.3	−4.5
Conservative	Samuel Hoare	4,232	19.7	−4.2
Majority		1,699	7.9	+5.9
Turnout			89.4	+5.8
Registered electors		12,146		
Liberal hold		Swing	+4.2	
Liberal gain from Conservative		Swing	+4.2	

Goddard & Horne January 1910 postcard

General election January 1910: Ipswich (2 seats)
Party	Candidate	Votes	%	±%
Liberal	Daniel Ford Goddard	6,120	26.1	−3.7
Liberal	Silvester Horne	5,958	25.5	−3.7
Conservative	Arthur Churchman	5,690	24.3	+3.0
Conservative	Bunnell Henry Burton	5,645	24.1	+4.4
Turnout			93.3	+3.9
Registered electors		12,641		
Majority		268	1.2	−6.7
Liberal hold		Swing	-3.4	
Liberal hold		Swing	-4.1	

General election December 1910: Ipswich (2 seats)
Party	Candidate	Votes	%	±%
Liberal	Daniel Ford Goddard	5,931	26.2	+0.1
Liberal	Silvester Horne	5,791	25.7	+0.2
Conservative	Arthur Churchman	5,447	24.1	−0.2
Conservative	Bunnell Henry Burton	5,409	24.0	−0.1
Turnout			89.9	−3.4
Registered electors		12,641		
Majority		344	1.6	+0.4
Liberal hold		Swing	+0.2	
Liberal hold		Swing	+0.2	

Parliament of the United Kingdom
Preceded by Lord Elcho; Sir Charles Dalrymple	Member of Parliament for Ipswich; 1895 – 1918; With: Sir Charles Dalrymple 1886–1906; Felix Cobbold 1906–1910; Silvester Horne 1910–1914; John Ganzoni 1914–1918	Succeeded by John Ganzoni
