= Wilson baronets of Eshton Hall (1874) =

The Wilson baronetcy, of Eshton Hall in the County of York, was created in the Baronetage of the United Kingdom on 16 March 1874 for the Liberal politician Mathew Wilson. He represented Clitheroe, West Riding of Yorkshire North and Skipton in the House of Commons.

The 4th Baronet sat as Unionist Member of Parliament for Bethnal Green South West from 1914 to 1922. The 6th Baronet, Tony Wilson, was a brigadier of the British Army, commanding the 5th Infantry Brigade in the Falklands War of 1982. He lived in the United States and published travel books. He died in 2019 and was succeeded in the baronetcy by his only son.

== Wilson baronets, of Eshton Hall (1874) ==
- Sir Mathew Wilson, 1st Baronet (1802–1891)
- Sir Mathew Wharton Wilson, 2nd Baronet (1827–1909)
- Sir Mathew Amcotts Wilson, 3rd Baronet (1853–1914)
- Sir Mathew Richard Henry Wilson, 4th Baronet, CSI, DSO (1875–1958)
- Sir (Mathew) Martin Wilson, 5th Baronet (1906–1991)
- Sir Mathew John Anthony Wilson, 6th Baronet, OBE, MC (1935–2019)
- Sir Mathew Edward Amcotts Wilson (born 1966), 7th Baronet

The heir apparent is Matthew Titus Henry Wilson (born 1998), son of the present holder.
