= Baron Belstead =

Extinct barony in the Peerage of the United Kingdom

Baron Belstead, of Ipswich in the County of Suffolk, was a title in the Peerage of the United Kingdom. It was created on 27 January 1938 for the Conservative politician Sir John Ganzoni, 1st Baronet. He had already been created a Baronet, of Ipswich in the County of Suffolk, in the Baronetage of the United Kingdom on 22 March 1929. He was succeeded by his son John, the second Baron. He was also a Conservative politician and served as Leader of the House of Lords from 1988 to 1990. After the passing of the House of Lords Act 1999, Lord Belstead was created a life peer as Baron Ganzoni, of Ipswich in the County of Suffolk, on 17 November 1999, in order to allow him to remain in the House of Lords. He never married and the titles became extinct on his death in 2005.

== Barons Belstead (1938) ==
- Francis John Childs Ganzoni, 1st Baron Belstead (1882–1958)
- John Julian Ganzoni, 2nd Baron Belstead (1932–2005)

== Coat of arms ==
Coat of arms of Baron Belstead
Notes Coat of arms of the Ganzoni family Coronet A coronet of a Baron Crest A Demi Lion Or supporting a Gentian Plant as in the Arms Escutcheon Per fess Azure and Argent a Gentian Plant flowered and eradicated proper between in chief a Mullet and an Increscent both Or Supporters On either side a Seahorse proper gorged with a Collar pendent therefrom a Portcullis chained Or Motto Fidelitas Vincit (Fidelity overcomes)
