= Sir Jack Harris, 2nd Baronet =

New Zealand businessman (1906–2009)

Jack Wolfred Ashford Harris 2nd Baronet
- Born: 23 July 1906; London, England
- Died: 26 August 2009 (aged 103); Porirua, New Zealand
- Education: Shrewsbury School
- Alma mater: Trinity Hall, Cambridge
- Occupation: Businessman
- Parents: Sir Percy Harris (father); Marguerite Frieda Bloxam (mother)
- Relatives: Christopher Harris (son)

Sir Jack Wolfred Ashford Harris, 2nd Baronet (23 July 1906 – 26 August 2009) was a New Zealand businessman, and the second baronet of the Harris Baronetcy of Bethnal Green, County of London which was created for his father Sir Percy Harris (1876–1952) in 1932. Frieda Harris was his mother. He succeeded to the title in 1952.

Harris was born in London, and educated at Shrewsbury School and Trinity Hall, Cambridge where he received a BA. He came to New Zealand in 1926.

Harris was chief executive (1936–1970) of Bing, Harris and Co., a New Zealand general importing and exporting company established in 1858 by his grandfather, Wolf Harris (1858–1926). He later lived in Waikanae near Wellington. He died aged 103 on 26 August 2009 at a rest home in the suburb of Whitby in Porirua. Upon his death, he was succeeded as baronet by his son, Christopher John Ashford Harris, as 3rd Baronet.

Baronetage of the United Kingdom
Preceded by Percy Harris	Baronet (of London); 1952–2009	Succeeded by Christopher Harris
