= Silvester Horne =

Congregational minister (1865–1914)

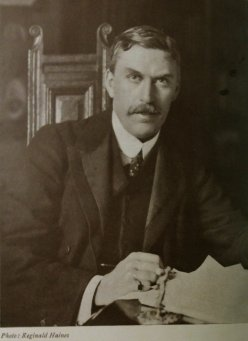
- Silvester Horne in book published 1920

Member of Parliament for Ipswich
- In office 15 January 1910 – 2 May 1914
- Preceded by: Felix Cobbold
- Succeeded by: John Ganzoni

Personal details
- Born: Charles Silvester Horne; 15 April 1865 Cuckfield, Sussex
- Died: 2 May 1914 (aged 49) Canada
- Party: Liberal
- Relations: Herbert Cozens-Hardy (father-in-law); Ronald Gordon (grandson)
- Children: Kenneth Horne
- Education: Mansfield College, Oxford

Charles Silvester Horne (15 April 1865 – 2 May 1914) was a Congregational minister, Liberal MP for Ipswich, and a noted orator. He was the father of Kenneth Horne. Horne authored several books, including a history of the London Missionary Society and its global work.

== Childhood ==
Born in Cuckfield, Sussex, on 15 April 1865, he was the youngest child of Charles Horne, minister of Cuckfield Congregational Church, and Harriet Silvester Simpson.

When he was six weeks old, his family relocated to Newport, Shropshire. Here, Charles Horne left the ministry to become editor of the local newspaper, the Newport Advertiser and partnered with his wife's uncle, Charles Silvester, in a printing and bookselling business. Horne spent the remainder of his childhood in Newport and was educated at Adams' Grammar School, where Tom Collins served as headmaster. The family newspaper was a shared enterprise, with every family member contributing at various times.

The family attended the Newport Congregational Chapel, described by Horne's biographer as "The most considerable Nonconformist place of worship in the town." It was through this church that Horne first began preaching, leading him to consider the Congregational ministry.

== Early adult years ==
He earned a MA from the University of Glasgow in 1886 and subsequently studied theology at Mansfield College, Oxford, joining the first intake of students at the new Congregational college. He began his career as Minister of Kensington Congregational Chapel. During this period, he married Katharine, the eldest daughter of Herbert Cozens-Hardy, who served as Master of the Rolls from 1907 to 1918.

January 1910 Liberal Election Postcard

== Fame grows ==
His reputation as a preacher and author grew after he took over Whitefield's Tabernacle, Tottenham Court Road in 1903, which he rebuilt as Whitefield's Central Mission. He also wrote hymns that are still sung today. His cantata "Livingstone the pilgrim" was performed by a chorus of 300 voices in the Royal Albert Hall at the Centenary celebrations for the birth of David Livingstone,

He was elected as one of the two Liberal MPs for Ipswich at the General Election of January 1910, serving until his death. He used his position as an MP to gain a national platform for his views.

== Death ==
In 1914, while on holiday in Canada, returning from Niagara Falls, Horne became suddenly ill while travelling on a steamer and died, aged forty-nine, before reaching Toronto. His body was returned home and buried in the cemetery at Cunnery Road, Church Stretton, Shropshire. Tributes were received from many, and his memorial service was attended by David Lloyd George. His wife and all but one of his children, Herbert, outlived him by over half a century; his last surviving children lived until 1984. One of his grandchildren, Ronald Gordon, served as Bishop of Portsmouth from 1975 to 1984.

== Family ==
He married Katharine Cozens-Hardy, daughter of Herbert Cozens-Hardy, in Kensington, London, in 1892. They had seven children:

Born in Kensington, London:

- Dorothy (1893 – 1959), married Sir Archibald Gordon; mother of Archibald Ronald McDonald Gordon
- Herbert Oliver (1894 – 1946)
- Margaret Bridget (1897 – 1984)
- Joan Silvester (1899/1900 – 1984)
- Ronald Cozens-Hardy (1902 – 1983)

Born in St. Pancras, London:

- Ruth Audrey (1905 – 1981)
- Charles Kenneth (1907 – 1969)

== Silvester Horne Institute ==
In Church Stretton, the Silvester Horne Institute, a notable community building serving as the town council's meeting place, is named after him. During his life, he also built the White House on Sandford Avenue in the town as the family home, which later became a nursing home before its demolition in 2006.

== Bibliography ==
- Binfield, Clyde. "Horne, (Charles) Silvester". Oxford Dictionary of National Biography (online ed.). Oxford University Press. doi:10.1093/ref:odnb/37569. (Subscription, Wikipedia Library access or UK public library membership required.)
- The life of Charles Silvester Horne, M.A., M.P. ([1920]) Author: Selbie, W.B. University of California Libraries Details of Biography
- The romance of preaching / Author: Horne, Charles Silvester, Publisher: New York : Fleming H. Revell Company, London James Clarke & Co Volumes of Sermons held in Iowa Libraries
- A Modern Heretic, novel- Horne, C.S. British Library Cataloguing
- Life of David Livingstone-Horne, C.S. List of Livingstone Biographies

Parliament of the United Kingdom
| Preceded by Felix Cobbold and Sir Daniel Ford Goddard | Member of Parliament for Ipswich; 1910–1914; With: Sir Daniel Ford Goddard | Succeeded by John Ganzoni and Sir Daniel Ford Goddard |
