= Felix Cobbold =

British banker, barrister, and politician

Felix Cobbold

Felix Thornley Cobbold (8 September 1841 – 6 December 1909) was a British banker, barrister and Liberal Party politician. He was a member of the Ipswich Cobbold brewing family but not a brewer himself.

== Life ==
Felix was born in Holywells Mansion, Ipswich. He was the son of John Cobbold, Member of Parliament for Ipswich, and his wife Lucy, daughter of Henry Patteson (sometime Rector of Drinkstone and of Wortham, Suffolk). John Cobbold, Thomas Cobbold and Nathaniel Cobbold, grandfather of Cameron Cobbold, 1st Baron Cobbold, were his elder brothers. He was educated at King's College, Cambridge, and returned to the college as a senior fellow in 1871, serving as the estates bursar until 1876. Cobbold also sat as member of parliament for Stowmarket in Suffolk between 1885 and 1886, and for Ipswich between 1906 and his death. Although he opposed Irish Home Rule originally, he returned to the Liberal Party as an advanced Radical. In 1895 he presented Christchurch Mansion to the town of Ipswich as part of an arrangement to preserve the mansion and surrounding Christchurch Park from development. He also bequeathed Gippeswyk Park to Ipswich. Cobbold died in December 1909, aged 68.

== See also ==
- Baron Cobbold

Parliament of the United Kingdom
New constituency	Member of Parliament for Stowmarket; 1885–1886	Succeeded by Edward Greene
Preceded by Charles Dalrymple; Daniel Ford Goddard	Member of Parliament for Ipswich; 1906– 6 December 1909 (death); With: Daniel Ford Goddard	Succeeded by Daniel Ford Goddard; Silvester Horne
