= Paddy Logan (politician) =

British politician (1845–1925)

Paddy Logan

John William Logan (1845 – 25 May 1925), known as Paddy Logan, was a civil engineering contractor and Liberal Member of Parliament (MP) for Harborough in Leicestershire.

He was the son of John Logan of Newport, Monmouthshire and educated at King's School, Gloucester. J. W. Logan was a successful railway contractor with the civil engineering firm of Logan and Hemingway. He moved to Leicestershire in 1876 to supervise a railway contract and lived near Market Harborough at East Langton Grange, where he gave the village a cricket ground and a hall. He also maintained a cottage home for the children of men killed on his works.

His health was poor following a hunting accident and he resigned as MP on two occasions. Logan had won Harborough from the Tories at a by-election on 8 May 1891 and held it until his resignation on 1 June 1904. He returned at the second general election of 1910, only to resign again six years later. His political career was devoted to improving the lot of agricultural labourers, and it was in their interests that he had agreed to stand for parliament on the second occasion, but the strain proved too great, forcing him to retire permanently from public life.

During his election campaigns, he was often denied the use of public halls and held his meetings under canvas in what he called the "free speech tent".

He was appointed as both Steward of the Manor of Northstead and Steward of the Chiltern Hundreds, as a means of resigning from the House of Commons. He was appointed to the former post in 1904 and to the latter in 1916.

J. W. Logan was a prominent sportsman and one of the founding fathers of the British racing pigeon fancy, writing Logan’s Pigeon Racer’s Handbook. He was president of Leicestershire County Cricket Club and his son, Hugh, played a single first-class cricket match for Leicestershire.

On his death at the age of 80 in 1925, he was buried at East Langton, where he had lived for 50 years. During his life he also visited Australia and New Zealand.

Logan Street in Market Harborough and the electoral ward of Market Harborough Logan in Harborough District is named after him. His children's names were used to name a couple of the cottages in Back Lane, East Langton.

Parliament of the United Kingdom
Preceded by Thomas Tapling	Member of Parliament for Harborough; 1891–1904	Succeeded by Philip Stanhope
Preceded by R. C. Lehmann	Member of Parliament for Harborough; 1910–1916	Succeeded by Percy Harris
