= Samuel Ridley =

British industrialist and politician (1864–1944)

Forde Ridley, before 1910.

Samuel Forde Ridley (1864 – 17 November 1944) was a British industrialist and Conservative Party politician.

== Biography ==
Born 1864, he was son of Samuel Edwin Ridley of St Helens, Isle of Wight and his wife Nona Jackson Kent. After education at Clifton College he entered the family firm of Ridley, Whitley and Company, linoleum manufacturers.

He first entered politics in 1895, when he was an unsuccessful candidate for the Conservative-backed Moderate Party in the London County Council elections of that year. In September 1900, he was selected as Conservative and Unionist candidate to contest the parliamentary seat of Bethnal Green South West, held by the prominent Liberal MP, Edward Pickersgill. Ridley's pro war stance saw him unexpectedly take the seat from Pickersgill at the general election of that year. Six years later there was a swing to the Liberals and they regained the Bethnal Green seat. In 1907, the local Conservative association chose a different candidate to contest the constituency at the next general election, with Ridley being rejected due to his views on tariff reform. He was instead chosen to contest the Kent borough of Rochester. He was able to unseat the sitting Liberal MP when an election was held in January 1910, but was himself defeated when a further election was held in December of the same year. In the following year he indicated that he would not contest the seat again.

He died at "Pantiles", Budleigh Salterton, Devon on 17 November 1944.

Parliament of the United Kingdom
Preceded by Edward Pickersgill	Member of Parliament for Bethnal Green South West; 1900–1906	Succeeded by Edward Pickersgill
Preceded by Ernest Lamb	Member of Parliament for Rochester; January 1910–December 1910	Succeeded by Ernest Lamb
