= Hugh Logan (cricketer) =

English cricketer

Personal information
- Full name: Hugh Logan
- Born: 10 May 1885; East Langton, Leicestershire, England
- Died: 24 February 1919 (aged 33); Tournai, Hainaut, Belgium
- Batting: Right-handed
- Relatives: William Everard (brother-in-law)

Domestic team information
- Years: Team
- 1903: Leicestershire

Career statistics
Competition	First-class
Matches	1
Runs scored	13
Batting average	6.50
100s/50s	–/–
Top score	12
Balls bowled	–
Wickets	–
Bowling average	–
5 wickets in innings	–
10 wickets in match	–
Best bowling	–
Catches/stumpings	–/–
- Source: Cricinfo, 1 March 2012

Hugh Logan (10 May 1885 − 24 February 1919) was an English cricketer. Logan was a right-handed batsman. The son of Liberal Party politician John William Logan and Maud Logan, he was born at East Langton Grange, East Langton, Leicestershire, and was educated at Westminster School.

Logan made a single first-class appearance for Leicestershire against the Gentlemen of Philadelphia at Aylestone Road in 1903. The Gentlemen of Philadelphia won the toss and elected to bat, making 200 in their first-innings. In response, Leicestershire made 164 runs in their first-innings, with Logan being dismissed for a single run by Percy Clark. The Gentlemen of Philadelphia made 287 runs in their second-innings, leaving Leicestershire with a target of 325 for victory. They fell short of their target, eventually being dismissed for 222, with Logan scoring 12 runs before he was dismissed by Bart King.

Logan served in World War I with the Leicestershire Yeomanry, holding the rank of lieutenant. He died following the Armistice at Tournai, Hainaut, Belgium, on 24 February 1919. He was survived by his wife, Phyllis Logan. His father served as President of Leicestershire County Cricket Club, while his brother-in-law, William Everard, also played first-class cricket for Leicestershire.
