= Ernest Lamb, 1st Baron Rochester =

British politician (1876–1955)

Ernest Henry Lamb, 1st Baron Rochester, CMG (4 September 1876 – 13 January 1955) was a British Liberal and National Labour politician who served as Paymaster General from 1931 to 1935 in the National Government of Ramsay MacDonald.

The eldest son of Benjamin Lamb of Yorkshire, Ernest was educated at Dulwich College and Wycliffe College before training as an electrical engineer. He specialised in the new technology of telephony, travelling extensively in Europe in this twenties. He returned to England and formed the New System Private Telephone Company, and was also chairman of the family firm of transport contractors, Lamb Sons and Company.

He entered public life when he was elected to the common council of the City of London, later becoming a deputy alderman and lieutenant of the city. He subsequently became a member of the Port of London Authority and chairman of the Chatham and District Water Board.

He then turned to national politics and was elected to parliament for Rochester in 1906 as a Liberal. He lost his seat in the January 1910 general election, but regained the seat in the December 1910 general election. He continued to hold this seat until the constituency was abolished in 1918.

Lamb was appointed a Companion of the Order of St Michael and St George (CMG) in 1907, and was knighted in 1914.

Lamb joined the Labour Party in 1929. On 23 January 1931, he was raised to the peerage as Baron Rochester, of Rochester in the County of Kent. He was a supporter of Ramsay MacDonald after the latter formed the National Government in August 1931 and his subsequent expulsion from the Labour Party, and became a member of the National Labour Organisation, founded the same year by supporters of MacDonald. In November 1931 MacDonald appointed him Paymaster General in the National Government. He continued to hold this post until 1935, and during the same period also represented the Ministry of Labour in the House of Lords.

After 1935, he took little further part in politics, devoting himself to religious and philanthropic activities. A Methodist, Rochester had acted as lay preacher since the nineteenth century. in 1941 he was elected vice president of the Methodist Conference. He served for many years on the board of the National Children's Home and Orphanage, was secretary of the Wesleyan Temperance and Social Welfare Department and vice president of the British and Foreign Bible Society.

He married Rosa Dorothea Hurst, daughter of William John Hurst of Drumaness, County Down, in 1913, and they had six children. He died at his home in Croydon, Surrey, in January 1955, aged 78, and was succeeded in the barony by his eldest son Foster Charles Lowry Lamb.

Parliament of the United Kingdom
Preceded by Charles Tuff	Member of Parliament for Rochester; 1906–January 1910	Succeeded by Samuel Forde Ridley
Preceded by Samuel Forde Ridley	Member of Parliament for Rochester; December 1910–1918	constituency abolished
Political offices
Preceded by Sir Tudor Walters	Paymaster General; 1931–1935	Succeeded by The Lord Hutchison of Montrose
Peerage of the United Kingdom
New creation	Baron Rochester; 1931–1955	Succeeded by Foster Charles Lowry Lamb
