= Gippeswyk Park =

Park in Ipswich, United Kingdom

Coordinates: 52.0517°N 1.1350°E

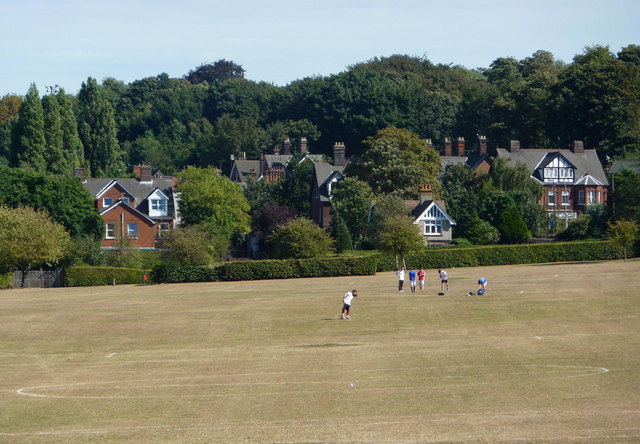
Gippeswyk Park, August 2009

Gippeswyk Park is a park in the South West of Ipswich in England. It was bequeathed to Ipswich by the MP Felix Cobbold. The park is located very close to the train station and the park's primary use is for recreation and includes numerous football pitches as well as two tennis courts which are always popular during the summer months.
