= Sir Paul Harris, 2nd Baronet =

Sir Paul Harris, 2nd Baronet (December 1595 – July 1644) was an English baronet and Surveyor of the Ordnance.

He was the second son of Sir Thomas Harris, 1st Baronet, of Shropshire, whom he succeeded as 2nd Baronet in January 1628/9 after the early death of his elder brother John. He was educated at Shrewsbury School and knighted in 1625.

In 1628 he was appointed Surveyor of the Ordnance, responsible for checking deliveries of new arms and other ordnance to the crown. He was appointed High Sheriff of Shropshire for 1637–38.

At the outbreak of the English Civil War Sir Paul declared for the Royalists and signed the Declaration and Protestation of the Gentlemen of Salop in 1642. He was replaced as Surveyor in 1643 by Parliamentary appointees and had his lands confiscated by Parliament for his loyalty to the deposed king.

He died in 1644 and was buried at Baschurch, Shropshire. He had married twice; firstly Anne, daughter of William Brett of Rotherby, Leicestershire and widow of Richard Paul and secondly Anne, the daughter of William Caulfeild. By his first wife he had 4 sons and 4 daughters, including his heir and successor Sir Thomas Harris, 3rd Baronet.

Military offices
Preceded by Sir Thomas Bludder	Surveyor of the Ordnance; 1628–1643	Succeeded by George Payler
Political offices
Preceded by Robert Corbet	High Sheriff of Shropshire; 1637	Succeeded by William Pierrepont
Baronetage of England
Preceded by Thomas Harris	Baronet (of Boreatton); 1629–1644	Succeeded by Thomas Harris
