= Sir Mathew Wilson, 4th Baronet =

British politician

Lieutenant-Colonel Sir Mathew Richard Henry Wilson, 4th Baronet, CSI, DSO (25 August 1875 – 17 May 1958) was a British landowner, soldier, and Unionist politician.

== Biography ==
Mathew Wilson was the son of Sir Matthew Amcotts Wilson, 3rd Baronet (1853–1914), and his wife Georgina Mary Lee. He was educated at Harrow School and Downing College, Cambridge. He fought in the Second Boer War and the First World War, and was Military Secretary to the Commander-in-Chief, India.

His nickname in London society was 'Scatters'.

He inherited the baronetcy in 1914 and was elected MP in the same year for Bethnal Green South West, winning the by-election by a slim majority of 24 votes. He was reelected with a larger majority of 2,299 in 1918, but lost his seat to the Liberal candidate Percy Harris in 1922.

Matthew Wilson married Barbara Lister (1880–1943), a daughter of Thomas Lister, 4th Baron Ribblesdale, on 7 September 1905. They had three children:

- Sir Mathew Martin Wilson, 5th Baronet (1906–1991)
- Anthony Thomas Wilson (1908–1979)
- Peter Cecil Wilson (1913–1984)

Parliament of the United Kingdom
Preceded by Charles Masterman	Member of Parliament for Bethnal Green South West; 1914–1922	Succeeded by Percy Harris
Baronetage of the United Kingdom
Preceded by Mathew Amcotts Wilson	Baronet; 1914–1958	Succeeded by Mathew Martin Wilson
