= John Ganzoni, 1st Baron Belstead =

British politician

The Right Honourable The Lord Belstead DL FRGS
- Ganzoni in 1914

Member of Parliament for Ipswich
- In office 23 May 1914 – 6 December 1923
- Preceded by: Silvester Horne and Daniel Ford Goddard
- Succeeded by: Robert Jackson
- In office 29 October 1924 – 27 January 1938
- Preceded by: Robert Jackson
- Succeeded by: Richard Stokes

Member of the House of Lords Lord Temporal
- In office 28 January 1938 – 15 August 1958; Hereditary Peerage
- Preceded by: Peerage created
- Succeeded by: The 2nd Lord Belstead

Personal details
- Born: 19 January 1882
- Died: 15 August 1958 (aged 76)
- Party: Conservative
- Education: Christ Church, Oxford

Francis John Childs Ganzoni, 1st Baron Belstead, DL, FRGS (19 January 1882 – 15 August 1958) was a Conservative Party politician in England.

== Personal life ==
Born to Julius Charles Ganzoni and Mary Frances Childs, Ganzoni was educated at Tonbridge School and Christ Church, Oxford, from which he received a Master of Arts in 1906. In that same year he became a barrister with membership of the Inner Temple.

On 31 May 1930, he married Gwendolen Gertrude Turner. He was the father of John Ganzoni, 2nd Baron Belstead.

== Public service ==
Ganzoni served in the First World War with the 4th Battalion of the Suffolk Regiment; he rose to the rank of Captain. On 23 May 1914 he won a by-election to become the Conservative Member of Parliament (MP) for the formerly Liberal constituency of Ipswich, a position he would hold, with the exception of a brief period from 1923 to 1924, until 1938.

During his parliamentary career he held other positions. He served as Chairman of the Private Bills Committee from 1923 to 1938. In 1924 he became Parliamentary Private Secretary to the Postmaster-General, retaining that position until 1929. He held the office of Deputy Lieutenant (DL) of Suffolk.

== Honours and arms ==
=== Honours ===
Ganzoni was knighted in the 1921 New Year Honours. On 1 March 1929, his baronetcy was announced and he was created a Baronet, of Ipswich, in the County of Suffolk for "political and public services" on 30 March 1929. In the 1938 New Year Honours, his barony for "political and public services" was announced and he was raised to the peerage as Baron Belstead, of Ipswich, Suffolk, on 28 January 1938. He was invested as a Fellow of the Royal Geographical Society (FRGS).

=== Coat of arms ===
Coat of arms of John Ganzoni, 1st Baron Belstead

Notes
Coat of arms of the Ganzoni family
Coronet
A coronet of a Baron
Crest
A Demi Lion Or supporting a Gentian Plant as in the Arms
Escutcheon
Per fess Azure and Argent a Gentian Plant flowered and eradicated proper between in chief a Mullet and an Increscent both Or
Supporters
On either side a Seahorse proper gorged with a Collar pendent therefrom a Portcullis chained Or
Motto
Fidelitas Vincit (Fidelity overcomes)

Parliament of the United Kingdom
Preceded by Silvester Horne and Sir Daniel Ford Goddard	Member of Parliament for Ipswich; 1914–1923; With: Sir Daniel Ford Goddard	Succeeded by Robert Jackson
Preceded by Robert Jackson	Member of Parliament for Ipswich; 1924–1938	Succeeded by Richard Stokes
Peerage of the United Kingdom
New creation	Baron Belstead; 1938–1958	Succeeded by John Ganzoni
Baronetage of the United Kingdom
New creation	Baronet (of Ipswich); 1929–1958	Succeeded by John Ganzoni
