= John Ganzoni, 2nd Baron Belstead =

British politician (1932–2005)

The Right Honourable The Lord Belstead PC

Paymaster General
- In office 28 November 1990 – 11 April 1992
- Prime Minister: John Major
- Preceded by: Richard Ryder
- Succeeded by: John Cope

Minister of State for Northern Ireland
- In office 28 November 1990 – 14 April 1992
- Prime Minister: John Major
- Preceded by: John Cope
- Succeeded by: Robert Atkins

Leader of the House of Lords Lord Keeper of the Privy Seal
- In office 10 January 1988 – 28 November 1990
- Prime Minister: Margaret Thatcher
- Preceded by: The Viscount Whitelaw (Leader of Lords); John Wakeham (Lord Privy Seal)
- Succeeded by: The Lord Waddington

Deputy Leader of the House of Lords
- In office June 1983 – January 1988
- Prime Minister: Margaret Thatcher
- Preceded by: The Earl Ferrers
- Succeeded by: The Earl Ferrers

Minister of State for Environment
- In office 13 June 1987 – 10 January 1988
- Prime Minister: Margaret Thatcher
- Preceded by: William Waldegrave
- Succeeded by: The Earl of Caithness

Minister of State for Agriculture, Fisheries and Food
- In office 13 June 1983 – 13 June 1987
- Prime Minister: Margaret Thatcher
- Preceded by: Alick Buchanan-Smith
- Succeeded by: John Gummer

Minister of State for Foreign and Commonwealth Affairs
- In office 5 April 1982 – 13 June 1983
- Prime Minister: Margaret Thatcher
- Preceded by: Richard Luce
- Succeeded by: Richard Luce

Parliamentary Under-Secretary of State for Home Affairs
- In office 7 May 1979 – 5 April 1982
- Prime Minister: Margaret Thatcher
- Preceded by: Shirley Summerskill
- Succeeded by: The Lord Elton

Parliamentary Under-Secretary of State for Northern Ireland
- In office 5 June 1973 – 4 March 1974
- Prime Minister: Edward Heath
- Preceded by: The Lord Windlesham (Minister of State)
- Succeeded by: The Lord Donaldson of Kingsbridge

Parliamentary Under-Secretary of State for Education and Science
- In office 24 June 1970 – 5 June 1973
- Prime Minister: Edward Heath
- Preceded by: Joan Lestor
- Succeeded by: Timothy Raison

Member of the House of Lords
- Lord Temporal
- Hereditary peerage 15 August 1958 – 11 November 1999
- Preceded by: The 1st Baron Belstead
- Succeeded by: Seat abolished
- Life peerage 17 November 1999 – 3 December 2005

Personal details
- Born: 30 September 1932
- Died: 3 December 2005 (aged 73)
- Party: Conservative
- Education: Christ Church, Oxford

John Julian Ganzoni, 2nd Baron Belstead, Baron Ganzoni, PC (30 September 1932 – 3 December 2005) was a British Conservative politician and peer who served as Leader of the House of Lords under Margaret Thatcher from 1988 to 1990.

== Background and education ==
Ganzoni was the only son of Sir John Ganzoni, a barrister and Conservative MP for Ipswich who was created Baron Belstead in 1938, and his wife Gwendolen Gertrude Turner, daughter of Arthur Turner, of Ipswich. He went to Eton before reading History at Christ Church, Oxford.

== Political career ==
Belstead showed little interest in politics at first, and waited six years after succeeding to the peerage on his father's death in 1958 before making his maiden speech. In 1970, Edward Heath appointed him to become Parliamentary Under-Secretary to Margaret Thatcher at the Department of Education and Science; he was moved in the same rank to the Northern Ireland Office three years later.

When Margaret Thatcher led the Tories back to power in 1979, she sent him to the Home Office. He was then made Minister at the Foreign Office when Lord Carrington and his team resigned after the Falklands invasion. In 1980, he was interviewed by the BBC's Panorama current affairs programme about Britain's preparations for a nuclear attack.

He next moved to the Ministry of Fisheries and Food, and went back to the Education Department again before becoming Deputy Leader to William Whitelaw as Leader of the House of Lords. He succeeded Whitelaw in that post in 1988, taking the sinecure post of Lord Privy Seal at the same time.

After losing his Cabinet seat, which he had gained when he became Lord Privy Seal, in 1990 he became Paymaster General and Northern Ireland Minister under John Major, retiring from the Government to become Chairman of the Parole Board in 1992.

In the 1983 New Year Honours, he was sworn of the Privy Council. After the House of Lords Act 1999 removed the automatic right of hereditary peers to sit in the House of Lords, he was created a life peer (an honour given to all former Leaders of the House of Lords) as Baron Ganzoni, of Ipswich in the County of Suffolk on 17 November 1999. He also gave his name to the new "Belstead Centre" at Woodbridge School.

== Personal life ==
Lord Belstead never married. He died in December 2005, aged 73, when both the hereditary peerage and the baronetcy became extinct. He is buried in the churchyard of St Mary's, Great Bealings, Suffolk.

He was an active Freemason and president of the Board of General Purposes for the United Grand Lodge of England. He was appointed to be a Deputy Lieutenant of the County of Suffolk on 2 April 1979.

== Coat of arms ==
Coat of arms of John Ganzoni, 2nd Baron Belstead

Notes
Coat of arms of the Ganzoni family
Coronet
A coronet of a Baron
Crest
A Demi Lion Or supporting a Gentian Plant as in the Arms
Escutcheon
Per fess Azure and Argent a Gentian Plant flowered and eradicated proper between in chief a Mullet and an Increscent both Or
Supporters
On either side a Seahorse proper gorged with a Collar pendent therefrom a Portcullis chained Or
Motto
Fidelitas Vincit (Fidelity overcomes)

Political offices
Preceded by The Earl Ferrers	Deputy Leader of the House of Lords; 1983–1988	Succeeded by The Earl Ferrers
Preceded by The Viscount Whitelaw	Leader of the House of Lords; 1988–1990	Succeeded by The Lord Waddington
Preceded by John Wakeham	Lord Privy Seal; 1988–1990	Succeeded by The Lord Waddington
Preceded by Richard Ryder	Paymaster General; 1990–1992	Succeeded by John Cope
Party political offices
Preceded by The Viscount Whitelaw	Leader of the Conservative Party in the House of Lords; 1988–1990	Succeeded by The Lord Waddington
Honorary titles
Preceded by Joshua Rowley	Lord Lieutenant of Suffolk; 1994–2003	Succeeded by The Lord Tollemache
Peerage of the United Kingdom
Preceded by John Ganzoni	Baron Belstead; 1958–2005	Extinct
