= Robert Jackson (Ipswich MP) =

British politician

Member of Parliament for Ipswich
- In office 6 December 1923 – 29 October 1924
- Preceded by: John Ganzoni
- Succeeded by: John Ganzoni

Personal details
- Born: Robert Frederick Jackson; 28 May 1880
- Died: 28 January 1951 (aged 70)
- Party: Labour

Robert Frederick Jackson (28 May 1880 – 28 January 1951) was a Labour Party politician in the United Kingdom. He was the first Labour Member of Parliament (MP) for Ipswich in Suffolk from 1923 to 1924.

Jackson contested the Ipswich seat at the 1922 general election, significantly increasing the Labour vote, but failing to unseat the sitting Conservative MP, John Ganzoni. At the 1923 general election, he won the seat, with a majority of only 1.4% of the votes. However, Ganzoni retook the seat in 1924 with a 10.8% majority, and although Jackson stood again in 1929, 1931 and 1935, he was never re-elected to the House of Commons.

Jackson was one of 64 MPs who sat only in the January–October 1924 Parliament.

Jackson also served as a Labour councillor on Ipswich Borough Council, serving as Mayor of Ipswich in 1933/34 and 1940/41.

Parliament of the United Kingdom
Preceded by John Ganzoni	Member of Parliament for Ipswich; 1923–1924	Succeeded by John Ganzoni
