= Baron Rochester =

Barony in the Peerage of the United Kingdom

Baron Rochester, of Rochester in the County of Kent, is a title in the Peerage of the United Kingdom. It was created in 1931 for the Liberal and National Labour politician, Ernest Lamb. He served as Paymaster General from 1931 to 1935. As of 2017 the title is held by his grandson, the third Baron, who succeeded in 2017.

The Hon. Tim Lamb, Chief Executive of the England and Wales Cricket Board from 1997 to 2004, is the younger son of the second Baron Rochester.

== Barons Rochester (1931) ==
- Ernest Henry Lamb, 1st Baron Rochester (1876–1955)
- Foster Charles Lowry Lamb, 2nd Baron Rochester (1916–2017)
- David Charles Lamb, 3rd Baron Rochester (b. 1944)

The heir apparent is the present holder's son the Hon. Daniel Lamb (b. 1971).
