= Edward Pickersgill =

English politician (1850–1911)

Edward Pickersgill

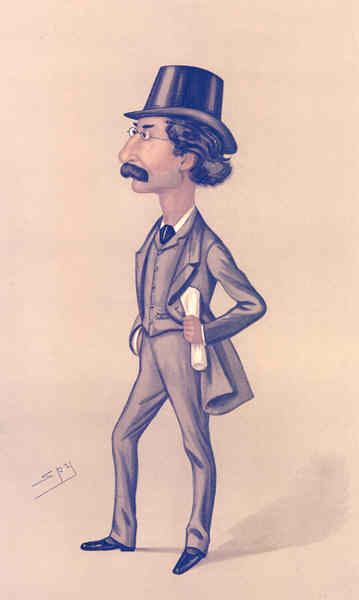
"Bethnal Green". Caricature by Spy published in Vanity Fair in 1888.

Edward Hare Pickersgill (1850 – 13 October 1911) was an English Liberal Party politician who sat in the House of Commons from 1885 to 1911.

== Biography ==
Pickersgill was the son of Thomas Pickersgill, an architect of York. He was educated at York Grammar School before entering employment at age 18 as a clerk in Savings Bank Department of the Post Office, remaining there until 1885. He graduated with a B.A. from London University in 1872 and was called to the bar at the Inner Temple in 1884, and practiced as a Treasury counsel at the Old Bailey.

At the 1885 general election Pickersgill was elected Member of Parliament for Bethnal Green South West. He was regarded as being on the Radical wing of the Liberal Party, and campaigned for reform of criminal law, in particular seeking to end imprisonment for non-payment of debt. He also sought the abolition of the death penalty and the ending of flogging as a punishment. From 1892 to 1895, he was a Progressive Party member of the London County Council representing Hackney Central. At the "khaki" general election of 1900 he lost his seat to a Unionist opponent, but regained it six years later when there was a swing to the Liberals. He held the seat at the two general elections of 1910, but resigned from the Commons by taking the Manor of Northstead in July 1911 in order to take up a post as a stipendary magistrate.

In October 1911, he contracted pneumonia and died at his sister's house in Putney, on 13 October 1911, aged 61.

Parliament of the United Kingdom
New constituency	Member of Parliament for Bethnal Green South West; 1885–1900	Succeeded by Samuel Forde Ridley
Preceded by Samuel Forde Ridley	Member of Parliament for Bethnal Green South West; 1906–1911	Succeeded by Charles Masterman
