= 1891 Harborough by-election =

UK parliamentary by-election

A by-election was held in Harborough on 8 May 1891 after the incumbent Conservative MP Thomas Tapling died on 11 April. The seat was won by the Liberal candidate Paddy Logan.

== Result ==
1891 Harborough by-election
Party	Candidate	Votes	%	±%
Liberal	Paddy Logan	5,982	52.1	+7.6
Conservative	Gerald Holbech Hardy	5,493	47.9	−7.6
Majority		489	4.2	N/A
Turnout		11,475	86.3	+3.9
Registered electors		13,291		
Liberal gain from Conservative		Swing	+7.6	
