= 1916 Harborough by-election =

UK parliamentary by-election

The 1916 Harborough by-election was a Parliamentary by-election held on 23 March 1916. Harborough returned one Member of Parliament (MP) to the House of Commons of the United Kingdom, elected by the first past the post voting system. The by-election was due to the resignation of the Liberal MP, John William Logan. It was won by the Liberal candidate Percy Harris.

== Vacancy ==
John William Logan had been Liberal MP for the seat of Harborough since the December 1910 General Election. His health was poor following a hunting accident. In 1910 he returned to the House but by 1916 the strain proved too great, forcing him to retire permanently from public life.

== Electoral history ==
Harborough had been won by a Liberal candidate at every election since its 1885 creation, apart from 1886 when the Conservative won. Logan had represented the division from 1891 to 1904 and again since December 1910.

Logan

General Election December 1910
Party	Candidate	Votes	%	±%
Liberal	John William Logan	8,192	53.5	+0.2
Conservative	Joseph Herbert Marshall	7,115	46.5	+0.2
Majority		1,077	7.0	−0.2
Turnout		15,307	85.4	−5.0
Liberal hold		Swing	+0.2	

== Candidates ==
Logan's long-standing poor health had meant that the local Liberal Association were advanced in selecting his replacement. In anticipation of a 1915 General Election, they had already selected Percy Harris. Harris was a London County Councillor, who had stood twice for parliament elsewhere. He had no links with the constituency but his candidacy was officially endorsed by both the Unionist and Labour parties, due to the wartime electoral truce.

== Campaign ==
The campaign took place against a national backdrop of a war that was not going well for Britain. The Coalition Government led by H. H. Asquith was being criticised by the Northcliffe Press. Its newspapers got behind the Independent candidate Tommy Bowles who campaigned on the issue of married men who had attested under the Derby Scheme. Advertising hoardings in the constituency were bought up by Northcliffe and carried slogans like "Buy the Daily Mail and vote for Bowles". A special pro-Bowles local edition of the Daily Mirror was produced and delivered free to homes in the constituency. Although the local Unionist association formally supported Harris, in line with the national all-party agreement, a number of local Unionists chose to support and actively campaign for Bowles.

== Result ==
Despite the activities of the Northcliffe papers and local Unionists, the Liberals held the seat with an increased share of the vote.

Harborough by-election, 1916
Party	Candidate	Votes	%	±%
Liberal	Percy Harris	7,826	67.8	+14.3
Independent	Thomas Gibson Bowles	3,711	32.2	New
Majority		4,115	35.6	+28.6
Turnout		11,537		
Liberal hold		Swing		

== Aftermath ==
In 1918, Harris's Unionist opponent was endorsed by the Coalition Government and gained the seat.

General Election 1918: Harborough
Party	Candidate	Votes	%	±%
Unionist	Keith Fraser	8,465	48.2	+1.5
Liberal	Percy Harris	4,608	26.2	−27.1
Labour	Walter Baker	4,495	25.6	New
Majority		3,857	22.0	N/A
Turnout		17,568	63.3	−22.1
Unionist gain from Liberal		Swing	+14.3	
