= Lady Frieda Harris =

English artist (1877-1962)

Frieda Harris
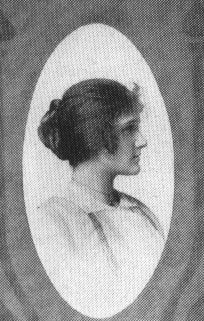
- Born: 13 August 1877; London, England
- Died: 5 November 1962 (aged 85); Srinagar, India
- Spouse: Sir Percy Harris (m. 1901–1952)
- Father: John Astley Bloxam
- Relatives: Jack Harris (son)

Marguerite Frieda, Lady Harris (née Bloxam, 13 August 1877 – 5 November 1962), referred to, by her own insistence, as Lady Frieda Harris, was an English artist and, in later life, an associate of the occultist Aleister Crowley. She is best known for her design of Crowley's Thoth Tarot.

== Family ==
Frieda Bloxam was a daughter of surgeon John Astley Bloxam, F.R.C.S. (1843–1926) and Jessie Findlay Bloxam née Porter (1851–1926). She married Percy Harris in April 1901. Percy Harris served as a Liberal Party MP 1916–1918 and 1922–1945, and was Chief Whip for his party. After her husband was created a baronet in 1932 she was entitled to style herself Lady Harris but preferred to use Lady Frieda Harris.

Frieda and Percy Harris had two sons: Jack (born 1906, later Sir Jack Wolfred Ashford Harris, 2nd Baronet) and Thomas (born 1908).

== Introduction to Crowley ==
Aleister Crowley had asked playwright and author Clifford Bax to help him find an artist for a Tarot project. On 9 June 1937 Bax invited Frieda Harris after two artists did not show up for an appointment. She was then aged 60.

As well as reading books by Crowley, Harris' study of Rudolf Steiner's Anthroposophy was to be a critical aspect in the creation of the Thoth deck. Crowley's friend Greta Valentine, a London socialite, also knew Harris. Harris and Crowley did much of their work on the Thoth tarot deck at Valentine's house in Hyde Park Crescent, London.

In 1937 Harris began taking lessons in projective synthetic geometry, based upon the ideas of Goethe as reflected in the teachings of Steiner, from Olive Whicher and George Adams.

John Symonds writes:

[Crowley] helped her through the portals of the mystical Order of the A∴A∴ (Argenteum Astrum) She took the name of Tzaba "Hosts", which adds up to 93, the number of the Thelemic current which she was trying to tap.

According to Crowley's unpublished Society of Hidden Masters, on 11 May 1938, Lady Harris became his "disciple" and also became a member of Ordo Templi Orientis, entering directly to the IV° (Fourth Degree) of that Order due to her previous initiation into Co-Masonry.

Crowley also began to teach her divination—she had a choice of discipline and opted for the I Ching.

== Harris visits Crowley ==
The author William Holt in his autobiography describes how he accompanied Harris to Crowley's lodgings at 93 Jermyn Street, Piccadilly. While Harris drew some charcoal sketches, there was a discussion on The Book of Thoth that Crowley was writing.

== Creating the Thoth Tarot ==
By Crowley's own admission, the deck was originally intended to be traditional but Harris encouraged him to commit his occult, magical, spiritual and scientific views to the project.

Harris sent Crowley a regular stipend throughout the project. She also used her society contacts to find financial backers for the exhibition of the paintings, the catalogues, and for the publication of the Tarot deck. The pressure may have taken its toll on Harris and Crowley was sufficiently concerned to call in the lawyers to protect his 66% investment in the project. Crowley gives Harris praise in the introduction to the Book of Thoth:

She devoted her genius to the Work. With incredible rapidity she picked up the rhythm, and with inexhaustible patience submitted to the correction of the fanatical slave-driver that she had invoked, often painting the same card as many as eight times until it measured up to his Vanadium Steel yardstick!

Throughout the project she insisted on her own anonymity but she revelled in working for such a notorious man. The Book of Thoth was published in 1944 in a 200 copy limited edition, but neither Crowley or Harris lived to see the deck itself printed.

== Crowley's last days ==
The surviving letters between Frieda Harris and Crowley show the level of their devotion to each other. On 29 May 1942 Crowley wrote to Pearson, the photoengraver of the Thoth deck:

I should like to emphasise that I am absolutely devoted to Lady Harris, and have the evidence of countless acts of kindness on her part, indicating that her feelings toward me are similar.

There is a break in the Harris – Crowley letters after the exhibition in July 1942 but she was in close contact with him, particularly towards the end of his life, and visited him frequently. A pencil sketch she made of Crowley on his deathbed survives.

After Crowley's death she wrote to Frederic Mellinger, an O.T.O. member in Germany, on 7 December 1947:

He was well taken care of. I made him have a nurse about 3 months ago as he was dirty & neglected & he had Watson who was most devoted & the Symonds were as nice as they knew how to be. At the last Mrs. McAlpine & the boy were there. I saw him the day he died, but he did not recognize me. I think Mrs. McAlpine was with him but she says there was no struggle, just stopped breathing. I shall miss him terribly. An irreplaceable loss.

Frieda Harris and Louis Wilkinson were the executors of Crowley's will. She also corresponded with Gerald Gardner and Karl Germer, Crowley's successor as head of O.T.O., in an attempt to assist with the Order's structure in Europe, which had been thrown into some confusion after Crowley's death.

== Later life ==
After her husband's death in 1952, she moved to India. She died in Srinagar on 5 November 1962. She bequeathed the original paintings of her Tarot cards to fellow Thelemite Gerald Yorke, who in turned placed them with the Warburg Institute along with much other Crowley material that he had collected over the years. However, Yorke retained several alternative versions of the cards and some preliminary studies which he later sold through bookdealer Harold Mortlake.

Her legacy can be found in a later reprinting of The Book of Thoth:

May the passionate "love under will" which she has stored in this Treasury of Truth and Beauty flow forth from the Splendour and Strength of her work to enlighten the world; may this Tarot serve as a chart for the bold seamen of the New Aeon, to guide them across the Great Sea of Understanding to the City of the Pyramids!

== See also ==
- Members of Ordo Templi Orientis
