= 1914 Bethnal Green South West by-election =

Bethnal Green South West by-election
← 1911	19 February 1914	1918 →

Candidate	Wilson	Masterman	Scurr
Party	Unionist	Liberal	Socialist
Popular vote	2,828	2,804	316
Percentage	47.6%	47.1%	5.3%
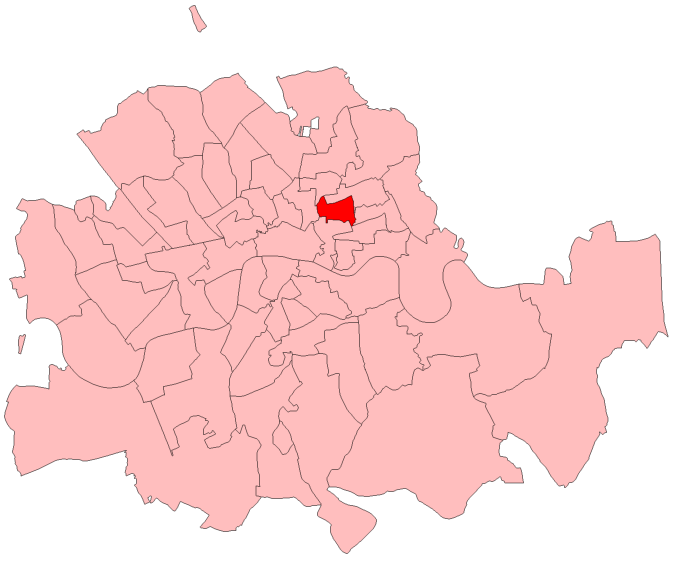
MP before election
Masterman
Liberal
Subsequent MP
Wilson
Unionist

The 1914 Bethnal Green South West by-election was a Parliamentary by-election held on 19 February 1914. The constituency returned one Member of Parliament (MP) to the House of Commons of the United Kingdom, elected by the first past the post voting system.

== Vacancy ==
In 1914 Charles Masterman the Liberal MP for Bethnal Green South West was appointed to the Cabinet as Chancellor of the Duchy of Lancaster. However under the law at the time, any MP nominated as minister was legally required to recontest their seat in a by-election.

== Electoral history ==
1911 Bethnal Green South West by-election
Party	Candidate	Votes	%	±%
Liberal	Charles Masterman	2,745	50.4	−6.6
Conservative	Eric Alfred Hoffgaard	2,561	47.1	+4.1
Independent Labour	John Scurr	134	2.5	New
Majority		184	3.3	−10.7
Turnout		5,440	76.8	+8.5
Liberal hold		Swing	-5.3	

== Candidates ==
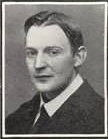
Masterman

- Charles Masterman had represented this seat since the previous by-election when he had held the seat in a three-cornered contest. Forty-one-year-old Masterman was undertaking his sixth election as a Liberal candidate and his fourth election in as many years.
- Sir Mathew Wilson was chosen to be the new Unionist challenger. Thirty-nine-year-old Sir Mathew Wilson had not stood for parliament before. He was a soldier who fought in the Boer War.
- Thirty-eight-year-old Australian-born Socialist John Scurr again stood. He had made a habit of contesting by-elections in the hope that he could attract sufficient Liberal votes to let the Unionist win. Since the 1911 by-election he had stood at the 1913 Chesterfield by-election where he finished a poor third. He was the nomination of the Bethnal Green Trades and Labour Council.
- The British Socialist Party also considered running a candidate.

== Campaign ==
The by-election posed a very real threat to Masterman's political future, with party controversy increased by the government's efforts at the time to introduce Home Rule into Ireland, and by the resulting possibility of civil war breaking out there. The militant Women's Social and Political Union and the John Bull League campaigned locally against Masterman. The John Bull League was a front organisation for Horatio Bottomley the right-wing owner of the John Bull magazine. Attempts were made to blacken Masterman's character by the Northcliffe press, and by Bottomley in his organ John Bull. The militant suffragettes opposed Masterman despite the fact that he was a supporter of women's suffrage, and had voted in support of the 1908 Women's Enfranchisement Bill.

== Result ==
At the request of the candidates, this was the first occasion which the hours of poll were extended for a Parliamentary election by opening at 7am instead of 8am. The result was declared after a re-count, at first the Unionist majority was found to be 22 votes, after the re-count the majority was increased to 24 votes.

1914 Bethnal Green South West by-election
Party	Candidate	Votes	%	±%
Unionist	Mathew Wilson	2,828	47.6	+0.5
Liberal	Charles Masterman	2,804	47.1	−3.3
Independent Labour	John Scurr	316	5.3	+2.8
Majority		24	0.5	N/A
Turnout		5,948	83.5	+6.7
Unionist gain from Liberal		Swing	+1.9	

== Aftermath ==
A General Election was due to take place by the end of 1915. By the summer of 1914, the following candidates had been adopted to contest that election. Due to the outbreak of war, the election never took place.

- Unionist: Mathew Wilson
- Liberal:
- Socialist: John Scurr

General election 14 December 1918: Bethnal Green South West
Party	Candidate	Votes	%	±%
Unionist	Mathew Wilson	4,240	52.3	
Independent Labour	Ernest Thurtle	1,941	23.9	New
Liberal	Hugh Meyler	1,935	23.8	
Majority		2,299	28.4	
Turnout		8,116	41.6	
Unionist hold		Swing		

- Wilson was the endorsed candidate of the Coalition Government.

== Bibliography ==
- Who's Who: www.ukwhoswho.com
