= Charles Masterman =

British politician and intellectual (1873–1927)

The Right Honourable Charles Masterman

Chancellor of the Duchy of Lancaster
- In office 11 February 1914 – 3 February 1915
- Prime Minister: H. H. Asquith
- Preceded by: Charles Hobhouse
- Succeeded by: Edwin Montagu

Head of Wellington House
- In office 1914–1917
- Preceded by: Position established
- Succeeded by: Position abolished

Member of Parliament for West Ham North
- In office February 1906 – December 1910

Member of Parliament for Bethnal Green South West
- In office July 1911 – 1914

Personal details
- Born: 25 October 1873
- Died: 17 November 1927 (aged 54)
- Party: Liberal
- Spouse: Lucy Lyttelton
- Children: 3, including Margaret
- Education: Christ's College, Cambridge

Charles Frederick Gurney Masterman PC MP (25 October 1873 – 17 November 1927) was a British radical Liberal Party politician, intellectual and man of letters. He worked closely with such Liberal leaders as David Lloyd George and Winston Churchill in designing social welfare projects, including the National Insurance Act 1911. During the First World War, he played a central role in the main government propaganda agency.

== Early life ==
Masterman was the third son of Thomas William Masterman of Rotherfield Hall in Sussex. His older brothers were the future natural historian Arthur Masterman and the future bishop Howard Masterman.

On his mother’s side, Masterman was a grandson of William Brodie Gurney and a distant relative of Elizabeth Fry.

He was educated at Weymouth College and Christ's College, Cambridge, where he was President of the Union, and joint Secretary of the Cambridge University Liberal Club from 1895 to 1896. At the university, he had two primary interests: social reform (influenced by Christian Socialism) and literature. His first published work was From the Abyss, a collection of articles he had written anonymously while living in the slums of south east London. These were highly impressionistic pieces and reflected his literary leanings. Following this, Masterman became a journalist and co-edited the English Review with Ford Madox Ford. In February 1900 he was elected a junior Fellow of Christ's College. In 1901, he edited a collection of essays by eminent people of the day, entitled The Heart of the Empire: a discussion of Problems of Modern City Life in England. In 1905 he published In Peril of Change, a collection of his own essays. He also wrote a biography of the Reverend F. D. Maurice (Frederick Denison Maurice), published in 1907. In the years up to 1906, he established many of the literary friendships that would be important in his later role as head of British propaganda in the First World War.

== Political career ==
Masterman was an unsuccessful candidate at the 1903 Dulwich by-election, but in the Liberal Party landslide victory at the general election of 1906, he was elected as Member of Parliament (MP) for West Ham North.

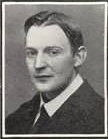
Masterman

In 1909, he published his best known book, The Condition of England, a survey of contemporary society with particular focus on the state of the working class.

Masterman ca. 1910

Masterman worked closely with Liberal leaders Winston Churchill and David Lloyd George on the People's Budget of 1909. By 1911, he was playing a major role in writing parts of the Finance Bill, the Development Bill, the Shop Hours Bill, and the Coal Mines Bill, and he was responsible for the passage through parliament of the National Insurance Act 1911.

He had a mediocre record as a candidate by losing more often than winning. He was re-elected in West Ham North in January 1910 and in December 1910. However, after the second election a petition was filed to unseat him on the grounds of an unlawful return of election expenses, and this proved successful.

In July 1911, Masterman was returned to Parliament at a by-election in the Bethnal Green South West constituency. He joined the Privy Council in 1912, and in 1914 obtained his most important position, an appointment to the Cabinet as Chancellor of the Duchy of Lancaster. However, the law at that time required him to recontest his seat in a by-election on joining the Cabinet. Masterman lost his own seat in February and then in May stood in a by-election at Ipswich, losing yet again. He resigned from the government as a result.

== Wartime propagandist ==
In the summer of 1914, Masterman strongly supported British entry into the First World War and was soon appointed as head of the War Propaganda Bureau (WPB), known as "Wellington House." His Bureau enlisted the eminent writers John Buchan, H. G. Wells, and Arthur Conan Doyle, as well as the painters Francis Dodd and Paul Nash. Before its abolition in 1917, the Bureau published some 300 books and pamphlets in 21 languages, distributed over 4,000 propaganda photographs every week, and circulated maps, cartoons and lantern slides to the media.

Masterman also commissioned films about the war such as The Battle of the Somme, which appeared in August 1916, while the battle was still in progress, as a morale-booster. It received a generally favourable reception. The Times reported on 22 August 1916, "Crowded audiences ... were interested and thrilled to have the realities of war brought so vividly before them, and if women had sometimes to shut their eyes to escape for a moment from the tragedy of the toll of battle which the film presents, opinion seems to be general that it was wise that the people at home should have this glimpse of what our soldiers are doing and daring and suffering in Picardy."

A major objective of his department was to encourage the United States to enter the war on the British and French side. Lecture tours and exhibitions of paintings were organised in the US, drawing on an extensive network of the most important and influential figures in the London arts scene, Masterman devising the most comprehensive arts patronage schemes ever to be supported in the country. It was subsumed into Buchan's Department of Information. It became a template for the war art scheme in the Second World War, headed by Sir Kenneth Clark. Lloyd George demoted Masterman in February 1917; he now reported to Buchan. The agency was peremptorily closed as soon as the war ended, and neither Masterman nor Buchan received the usual public honours. However, Masterman followed Lloyd George in his Liberal party maneuvers after 1918.

Masterman played a crucial role in publicising reports of the Armenian genocide, in part to strengthen the moral case against the Ottoman Empire. For his role, Masterman has been the target of repeated Turkish allegations that he fabricated, or at least embellished, the events for propaganda purposes.

== Career after the war ==
For the 1918 general election, Masterman returned to West Ham where he had sat for five years before the war. He contested the new seat of Stratford West Ham. However, his old boss, Lloyd George, chose to endorse his Unionist opponent, and he was badly beaten.

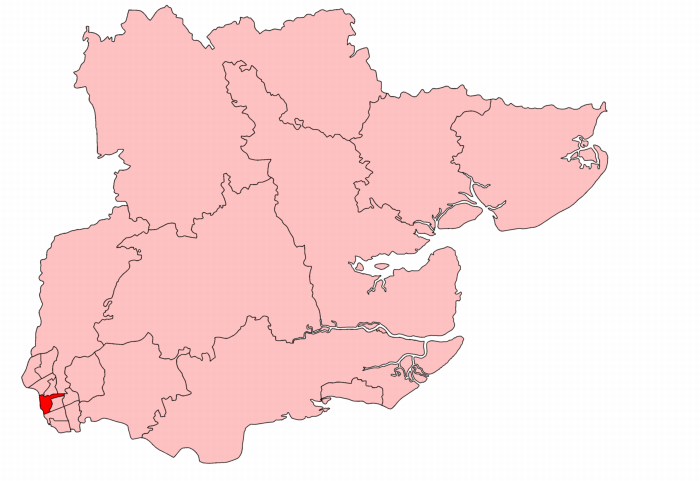
Stratford within Essex, 1918

Back in private life, Masterman continued his high output of books and essays. In 1922, he published How England is Governed. In 1921, he supported the Manchester Liberals radical programme, adopted by the National Liberal Federation, which called for the establishment of a National Industrial Council, state supervision of trusts and combines, nationalisation of some monopolies as well as profit limitations.

For the 1922 general Election, Masterman decided to contest Clay Cross in Derbyshire. At the previous election in 1918, the Liberal candidate had been endorsed by the Coalition Government and won. He subsequently took the Coalition Liberal whip and was defending his seat as a National Liberal, with the support of Lloyd George. The local Liberal association wanted an opponent of the coalition to run as their candidate and managed to attract Masterman. He outpolled the sitting member by nearly two to one, but the seat was won by the Labour candidate.

After the election, there was discussion in Liberal circles, of Lloyd George and his National Liberals returning to the party. Masterman was concerned about such a move and talked about defecting to the Labour Party if that happened. Masterman's good political relationship with the Manchester Liberals resulted in their inviting him to contest one of their constituencies, which he accepted. The Manchester Liberals won five seats at the 1923 general election, including Rusholme, where Masterman stood.

Following his election victory in 1923, Masterman revealed to his wife Lucy that he "thought we were never going to (win) again". In August 1924, he led the opposition to a treaty, negotiated by the Labour government, which guaranteed a loan to the Soviet government. During the 1924 election campaign, Masterman publicly blamed Prime Minister Ramsay MacDonald for the collapse of Liberal-Labour co-operation.

At the General election of 1924, Masterman was heavily defeated in Manchester Rusholme by the Unionist candidate Frank Boyd Merriman. The same fate befell almost all the Liberal members of parliament in England.

In 1925, he became the Parliamentary Correspondent for The Nation. Having initially expressed concerns about Lloyd George's return to the Liberal Party, he acknowledged that it was again easier to get the party to adopt measures of social reform: "When Lloyd George came back to the party, ideas came back to the party".

Lloyd George sponsored a number of reviews into areas of Liberal Party policy, and Masterman participated in those reviews, notably as part of the body that produced the policy document Coal and Power. He was also on the committee that ultimately produced Britain's Industrial Future, known as The Yellow Book.

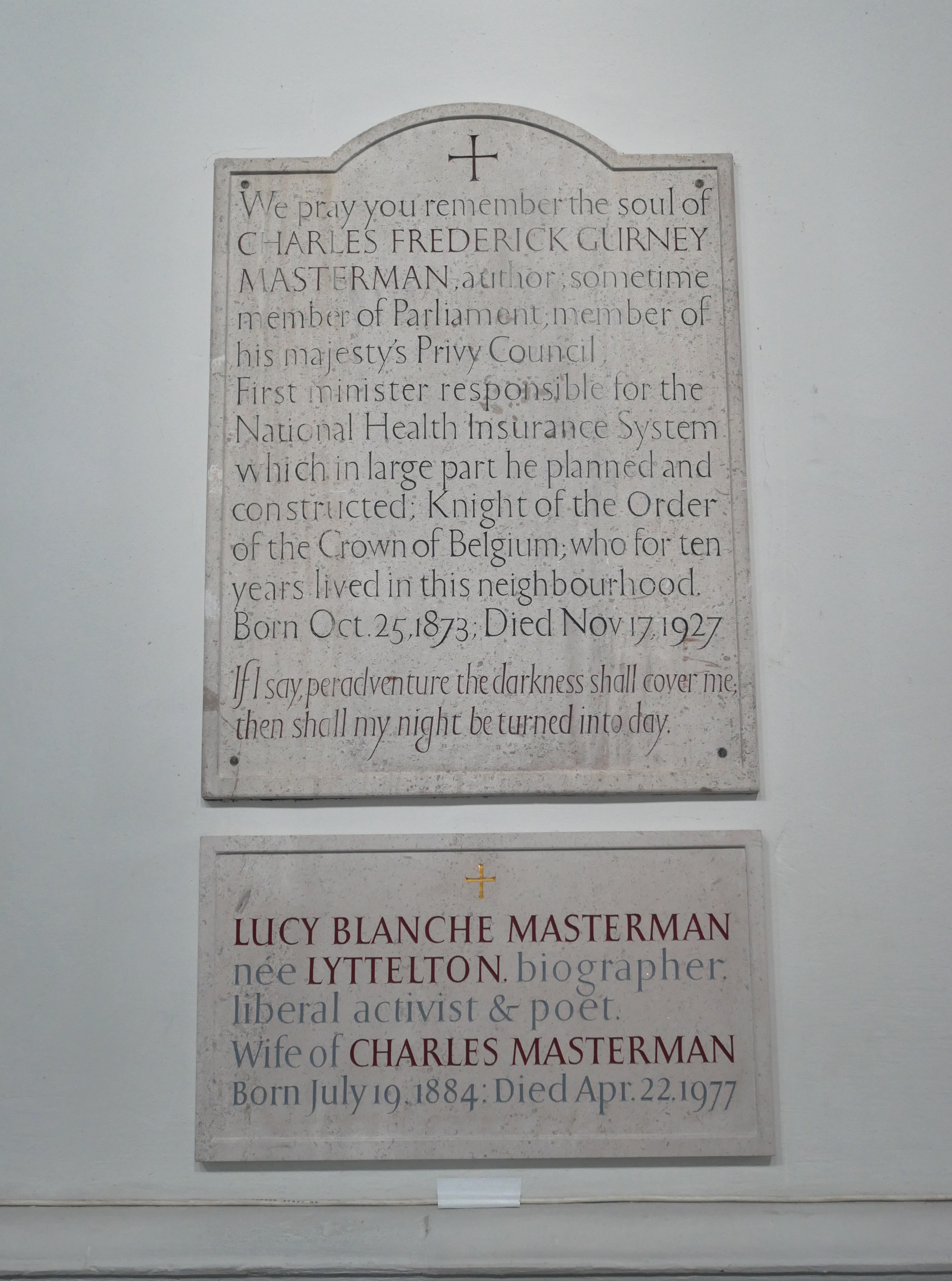
Plaque commemorating Masterman

Masterman‘s health declined rapidly, hastened by drug and alcohol abuse. He died in November 1927 at Bowden House, Harrow, leaving an estate valued at only £452. His address at death was stated as 46, Gillingham Street, Eccleston Square, Westminster.

He was buried in St Giles' Church, Camberwell, where a memorial tablet in the church commemorates him, stating that he had lived there for ten years. There is another for his wife.

== Assessments ==
Religion was central to Masterman’s career, and he worked to revive the Gladstonian alliance between Liberalism and Nonconformity. He frequently used the language of prophecy—for which he had been inspired by Thomas Carlyle and other seers. Masterman had a long-standing influence as a champion of radical change. On one hand, he ridiculed anachronistic attachments to outmoded Victorian ideals and institutions. However, his own rhetoric was deeply rooted in high Victorian idealism. He proposed a wide-ranging program to assist the working class, such as labour exchanges, wage boards and free meals for schoolchildren. Historians have puzzled as to his ability to lose elections that had been prearranged for him. He had psychological problems, such as severe mood swings and mental health problems, and his public demeanour often struck observers as cynical and self-righteous. John Buchan described Masterman as "one of the most brilliant, misunderstood, and tragically fated men of his time".

== Personal life ==
In 1908, Masterman married Lucy Blanche Lyttelton, poet,” and writer, later a politician, daughter of General Sir Neville Lyttelton. She was the author of A Book of Wild Things (1910), Poems (1913), and London from the Bus-top (1951); she also edited Mary Gladstone (Mrs Drew): her diaries and letters (1930). They had three children:

- Margaret Mary Masterman (4 May 1910 - 1 April 1986), a British linguist and philosopher most known for her pioneering work in the field of computational linguistics and especially machine translation. She founded the Cambridge Language Research Unit and was a founding Fellow of Lucy Cavendish College, Cambridge. Margaret was married to the distinguished Cambridge philosopher R.B. Braithwaite.
- Neville Charles Masterman (1912–2019), an academic historian at Swansea University. He served in the Second World War and was transferred to Bletchley Park where he learned Japanese to help with translation. Neville went to Westminster School and read Theology at Christ's College, Cambridge, his father's alma mater.
- Dorothy Hilda Masterman (1914–1981).

Lucy Masterman's biography of her husband was published in 1939. The Masterman Papers are held at the Cadbury Research Library, University of Birmingham.

== Election results ==
General election 1906: West Ham North
Party	Candidate	Votes	%	±%
Liberal	Charles Frederick Gurney Masterman	6,838	57.3	+18.8
Conservative	Ernest Gray	5,094	42.7	−18.8
Majority		1,744	14.6	37.6
Turnout			79.0	+11.2
Liberal gain from Conservative		Swing	+18.8	

General election December 1910: West Ham North
Party	Candidate	Votes	%	±%
Liberal	Charles Frederick Gurney Masterman	6,657	53.6	+02
Conservative	Ernest Edward Wild	5,760	46.4	−0.2
Majority		897	7.2	+0.4
Turnout			79.3	−0.7
Liberal hold		Swing	+0.2	

General election 1918: Stratford
Party	Candidate	Votes	%	±%
Unionist	Charles Ernest Leonard Lyle	8,498	63.8	n/a
Liberal	Rt Hon. Charles Frederick Gurney Masterman	4,821	36.2	n/a
Majority		3,677	27.2	n/a
Turnout		13,319		n/a
Unionist win				

General election 1922: Clay Cross
Party	Candidate	Votes	%	±%
Labour	Charles Duncan	13,206	57.9	+12.0
Liberal	Rt Hon. Charles Frederick Gurney Masterman	6,294	27.6	n/a
National Liberal	Thomas Tucker Broad	3,294	14.5	n/a
Majority		6,912	30.3	38.6
Turnout		22,794		
Labour gain from Liberal		Swing	n/a	

General election 1923: Manchester Rusholme
Party	Candidate	Votes	%	±%
Liberal	Rt Hon. Charles Frederick Gurney Masterman	10,901	43.4	+17.3
Unionist	John Henry Thorpe	8,876	35.3	−12.6
Labour	William Paul	5,366	21.3	−4.7
Majority		2,025	8.1	+29.9
Turnout			78.0	+0.2
Liberal gain from Unionist		Swing	+15.0	

General election 1924: Manchester Rusholme
Party	Candidate	Votes	%	±%
Unionist	Frank Boyd Merriman	13,341	50.4	+15.1
Liberal	Rt Hon. Charles Frederick Gurney Masterman	7,772	29.4	−14.0
Communist	William Paul	5,328	20.2	−1.1
Majority		5,569	21.0	29.1
Turnout			79.8	+1.8
Unionist gain from Liberal		Swing	-14.5	

== See also ==
- Liberalism in the United Kingdom

Parliament of the United Kingdom
Preceded by Ernest Gray	Member of Parliament for West Ham North; 1906–1911	Succeeded by Baron Maurice Arnold de Forest
Preceded by Edward Hare Pickersgill	Member of Parliament for Bethnal Green South West; 1911–1914	Succeeded by Sir Mathew Richard Henry Wilson
Preceded by John Henry Thorpe	Member of Parliament for Manchester Rusholme; 1923–1924	Succeeded by Sir Frank Boyd Merriman
Political offices
Preceded by Thomas James Macnamara	Parliamentary Secretary to the Local Government Board; 1908–1909	Succeeded by Herbert Lewis
Preceded by Herbert Samuel	Under-Secretary of State for the Home Department; 1909–1912	Succeeded by Ellis Ellis-Griffith
Preceded by Thomas McKinnon Wood	Financial Secretary to the Treasury; 1912–1914	Succeeded by Francis Dyke Acland
Preceded by Charles Hobhouse	Chancellor of the Duchy of Lancaster; 1914–1915	Succeeded by Edwin Montagu
