= Joe Vaughan (politician) =

British politician (1878–1938)

Joseph James Vaughan (1878 – 1938) was a British left-wing politician.

== Early life and career ==
Born in East London, Vaughan began working at the age of eight. He stayed at school part-time until he was thirteen. He worked a variety of jobs before he was apprenticed to a former Chartist, who shaped Vaughan's political education. He was encouraged to become a radical. He initially joined the Liberal Party, but soon grew disillusioned and chose the British Socialist Party (BSP).

Vaughan eventually settled into a career as an electrician, joined the Electrical Trades Union (ETU), and was elected president of Bethnal Green Trades Council. The BSP affiliated to the Labour Party, and it was under this party label that Vaughan was elected in 1914 to the Bethnal Green Borough Council. He was the only Labour member of the council until 1919, when the party won a large majority.

Vaughan stood for Mayor of Bethnal Green in 1919, and won. He is often cited as the first British communist mayor. He was re-elected in 1920 and 1921. When the Communist Party of Great Britain (CPGB) formed in 1920, Vaughan was one of the founding members. He chaired the BSP's Ninth Annual Conference in London in 1920. The next year he attended the 3rd World Congress of the Communist International in Moscow. During this period, he still remained a member of Labour, even serving on the executive of the London Labour Party.

In the 1922 and 1923 general elections, Vaughan stood as the Labour Party candidate for Bethnal Green South West. He also had the endorsement of the CPGB. He narrowly missing winning on both occasions. By this time, the Labour Party nationally had decided to expel its CPGB members. The Bethnal Green Labour Party refused to back the decision, and as a consequence was disaffiliated by Labour – the first of several such disaffiliations around the country. The ousted Bethnal members formed the "Left-Wing Committee", and Vaughan was instrumental in establishing the National Left-Wing Movement, which attempted to draw the various disaffiliated groups together into a broad Labour-Communist alliance.

In the 1924 general election, Vaughan stood for the first time as a CPGB candidate without official Labour support. In this election he did not face a Labour opponent, and achieved his best result, only 212 votes behind the winner. However, the council election was a different matter. Labour ran a candidate against him, and he lost his council seat to the Liberal Party candidate.

Over the next few years, Vaughan concentrated on CPGB work. When many of the party leaders were imprisoned in 1925, he served as an acting member of its organisation bureau. That year he stood for the general secretaryship of the ETU, but lost to Jimmy Rowan, 4067 votes to 730.

In a surprise change of tactic, the CPGB stood Vaughan in Manchester Platting at the 1929 general election, where he took only 1.0% of the votes cast. He stood once more in Bethnal Green South West in 1931, falling to third with 17.4% of the vote.

Vaughan thereafter focused on activism in the ETU. He was unable to find work for himself in the electrical trades, and spent long periods unemployed. In 1938 his union membership was removed on the grounds that he had not worked in the industry for twelve years. He died the same year.

Civic offices
Preceded by William John Lewis	Mayor of Bethnal Green; 1919–1922	Succeeded by George Whitworth
Party political offices
Preceded by Alf Barton	Chairman of the British Socialist Party Annual Conference; 1920	Party dissolved
