= Bethnal Green South West =

Parliamentary constituency in the United Kingdom, 1885–1950

- Former borough constituency for the House of Commons
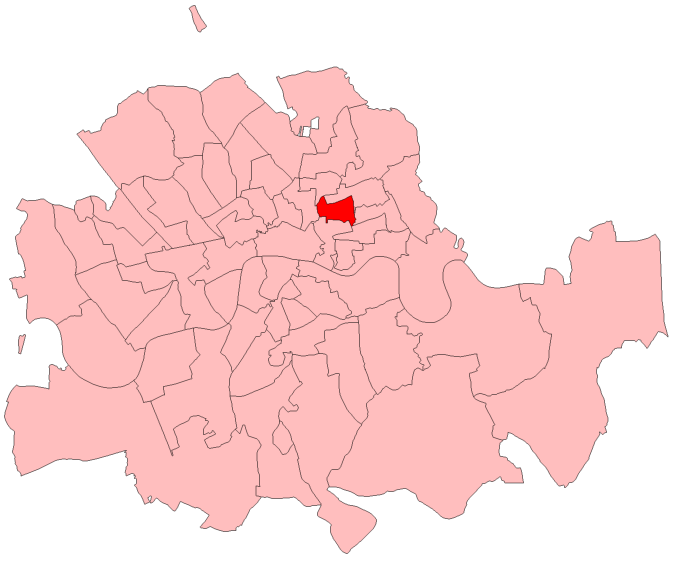
- Bethnal Green South West in London 1885-1918

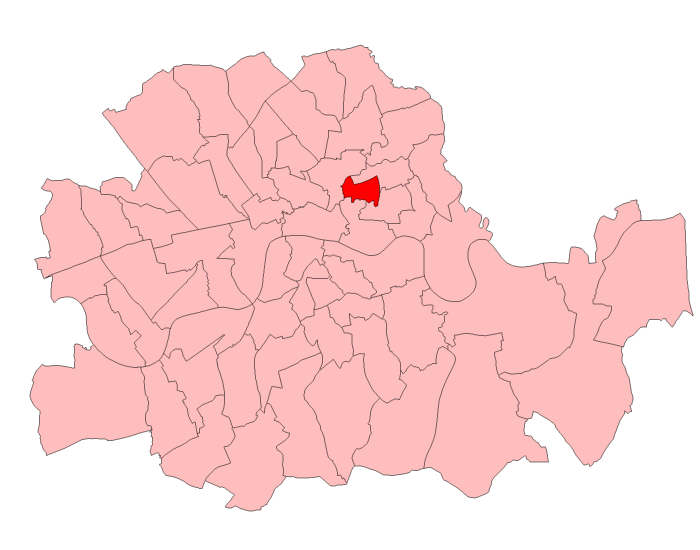
- Bethnal Green South West in London 1918-50

1885–1950
- Seats: one
- Created from: Hackney
- Replaced by: Bethnal Green

Bethnal Green South West was a constituency in London. It returned one Member of Parliament (MP) to the House of Commons of the Parliament of the United Kingdom.

It was created for the 1885 general election and abolished for the 1950 general election, when it was combined with Bethnal Green North East to form a new Bethnal Green constituency, reflecting the area's substantial fall in population.

== Boundaries ==

The constituency consisted of the south and west wards of the civil parish of Bethnal Green, Middlesex (later the Metropolitan Borough of Bethnal Green in the County of London).

1885-1918: The South and West wards of the parish of St. Matthew, Bethnal Green.

== Members of Parliament ==
Year	Member	Party
1885	Edward Pickersgill	Liberal
1900	Samuel Forde Ridley	Conservative
1906	Edward Pickersgill	Liberal
1911	Charles Masterman	Liberal
1914	Sir Mathew Wilson	Unionist
1922	Percy Harris	Liberal
1945	Percy Holman	Labour
1950	constituency abolished: see Bethnal Green	

== Election results ==
=== Elections in the 1880s ===
E.H. Pickersgill

General election 1885: Bethnal Green South West
Party	Candidate	Votes	%	±%
Liberal	Edward Pickersgill	3,088	58.4	
Conservative	John Evans Freke Aylmer	2,200	41.6	
Majority		888	16.8	
Turnout		5,288	64.0	
Registered electors		8,265		
Liberal win (new seat)				

General election 1886: Bethnal Green South West
Party	Candidate	Votes	%	±%
Liberal	Edward Pickersgill	2,550	56.0	−2.4
Conservative	John Evans Freke Aylmer	2,001	44.0	+2.4
Majority		549	12.0	−4.8
Turnout		4,551	55.1	−8.9
Registered electors		8,265		
Liberal hold		Swing	-2.4	

=== Election in the 1890s ===
General election 1892: Bethnal Green South West
Party	Candidate	Votes	%	±%
Liberal	Edward Pickersgill	3,206	59.6	+3.6
Conservative	Thomas Benskin	2,171	40.4	−3.6
Majority		1,035	19.2	+7.2
Turnout		5,377	68.8	+13.7
Registered electors		7,821		
Liberal hold		Swing	+3.6	

General election 1895: Bethnal Green South West
Party	Candidate	Votes	%	±%
Liberal	Edward Pickersgill	2,603	52.8	−6.8
Conservative	William Arnold Statham	2,324	47.2	+6.8
Majority		279	5.6	−13.6
Turnout		4,927	62.7	−6.1
Registered electors		7,855		
Liberal hold		Swing	-6.8	

=== Election in the 1900s ===
General election 1900: Bethnal Green South West
Party	Candidate	Votes	%	±%
Conservative	Samuel Ridley	2,862	53.2	+6.0
Liberal	Edward Pickersgill	2,514	46.8	−6.0
Majority		348	6.4	N/A
Turnout		5,376	66.1	+3.4
Registered electors		8,128		
Conservative gain from Liberal		Swing	+6.0	

General election 1906: Bethnal Green South West
Party	Candidate	Votes	%	±%
Liberal	Edward Pickersgill	3,542	63.2	+16.4
Conservative	Samual Ridley	2,064	36.8	−16.4
Majority		1,478	26.4	N/A
Turnout		5,606	77.2	+11.1
Registered electors		7,262		
Liberal gain from Conservative		Swing	+16.4	

=== Election in the 1910s ===
E.H. Pickersgill

General election January 1910: Bethnal Green South West
Party	Candidate	Votes	%	±%
Liberal	Edward Pickersgill	3,328	58.6	−4.6
Conservative	Eric Alfred Hoffgaard	2,350	41.4	+4.6
Majority		978	17.2	−9.2
Turnout		5,678	79.9	+1.7
Liberal hold		Swing	-4.6	

General election December 1910: Bethnal Green South West
Party	Candidate	Votes	%	±%
Liberal	Edward Pickersgill	2,768	57.0	−1.6
Conservative	Eric Alfred Hoffgaard	2,086	43.0	+1.6
Majority		682	14.0	−3.2
Turnout		4,854	68.3	−11.6
Liberal hold		Swing	-1.6	

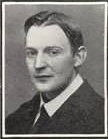
Masterman

1911 Bethnal Green South West by-election
Party	Candidate	Votes	%	±%
Liberal	Charles Masterman	2,745	50.4	−6.6
Conservative	Eric Alfred Hoffgaard	2,561	47.1	+4.1
Independent Labour	John Scurr	134	2.5	New
Majority		184	3.3	−10.7
Turnout		5,440	76.8	+8.5
Liberal hold		Swing	-5.3	

1914 Bethnal Green South West by-election
Party	Candidate	Votes	%	±%
Unionist	Mathew Wilson	2,828	47.6	+0.5
Liberal	Charles Masterman	2,804	47.1	−3.3
Independent Labour	John Scurr	316	5.3	+2.8
Majority		24	0.5	N/A
Turnout		5.948	83.5	+6.7
Unionist gain from Liberal		Swing	+1.9	

Hugh Meyler

General election 1918: Bethnal Green South West
Party		Candidate	Votes	%	±%
C	Unionist	Mathew Wilson	4,240	52.3	+4.7
	NFDDSS	Ernest Thurtle	1,941	23.9	New
	Liberal	Hugh Meyler	1,935	23.8	−23.3
Majority			2,299	28.4	+27.9
Turnout			6,116	41.6	−41.9
	Unionist hold		Swing		
C indicates candidate endorsed by the coalition government.

=== Election in the 1920s ===
General election 1922: Bethnal Green South West
Party	Candidate	Votes	%	±%
Liberal	Percy Harris	5,152	40.7	+16.9
Communist	Joe Vaughan	4,034	31.9	New
Unionist	Mathew Wilson	3,474	27.4	−24.9
Majority		1,118	8.8	N/A
Turnout		21,129	59.9	+18.3
Liberal gain from Unionist		Swing		

General election 1923: Bethnal Green South West
Party	Candidate	Votes	%	±%
Liberal	Percy Harris	5,735	43.3	+2.6
Labour	Joe Vaughan	5,251	39.6	+7.7
Unionist	John Cecil Gerard Leigh	2,267	17.1	−10.3
Majority		484	3.7	−5.1
Turnout		21,320	62.2	+2.3
Liberal hold		Swing	-2.5	

General election 1924: Bethnal Green South West
Party	Candidate	Votes	%	±%
Liberal	Percy Harris	6,236	42.3	−1.0
Communist	Joe Vaughan	6,024	40.9	+1.3
Unionist	C.P. Norman	2,467	16.8	−0.3
Majority		212	1.4	−2.3
Turnout		21,522	68.4	+6.2
Liberal hold		Swing	-1.1	

General election 1929: Bethnal Green South West
Party	Candidate	Votes	%	±%
Liberal	Percy Harris	8,109	45.9	+3.6
Labour	Christopher John Kelly	6,849	38.7	New
Communist	Robert Dunstan	1,368	7.7	−33.2
Unionist	Herbert John Malone	1,365	7.7	−9.1
Majority		1,260	7.2	+5.8
Turnout		27,895	64.1	−4.3
Liberal hold		Swing		

=== Election in the 1930s ===
General election 1931: Bethnal Green South West
Party	Candidate	Votes	%	±%
Liberal	Percy Harris	10,176	59.6	+13.7
Labour	W.J. Humphreys	3,923	23.0	−15.7
Communist	Joe Vaughan	2,970	17.4	+9.7
Majority		6,253	36.6	+29.4
Turnout		27,895	61.2	−2.9
Liberal hold		Swing	+14.0	

General election 1935: Bethnal Green South West
Party	Candidate	Votes	%	±%
Liberal	Percy Harris	9,011	53.1	−6.5
Labour	George Jeger	7,945	46.9	+23.9
Majority		1,066	6.2	−30.4
Turnout		27,484	61.7	+0.5
Liberal hold		Swing	-15.2	

=== Election in the 1940s ===
General election 1945: Bethnal Green South West
Party	Candidate	Votes	%	±%
Labour Co-op	Percy Holman	6,669	57.3	+10.4
Liberal	Percy Harris	4,213	36.2	−16.9
National	O. Howard Leicester	750	6.5	New
Majority		2,456	21.1	N/A
Turnout		11,632		
Labour gain from Liberal		Swing	+13.6	

== Bibliography ==
- Bethnal Green Parliamentary Representation at British History online
- Leigh Rayment's Historical List of MPs – Constituencies beginning with "B" (part 3)
