= Johnson-Ferguson baronets =

Baronetcy in the Baronetage of the United Kingdom

Escutcheon of the Johnson-Ferguson baronets

The Johnson-Ferguson baronetcy, of Springkell in the County of Dumfries, of Kenyon in Newchurch-in-Culcheth in the County Palatine of Lancaster and of Wiston in the County of Lanark, is a title in the Baronetage of the United Kingdom. It was created on 18 July 1906 for Edward Johnson-Ferguson. He was Chairman of Jabez Johnson, Hodgkinson and Pearson, Ltd, and also sat as Liberal Member of Parliament for Loughborough. Born Jabez Edward Johnson, he assumed by Royal license the additional surname of Ferguson in 1899.

== Johnson-Ferguson baronets, of Springkell, Kenyon and Wiston (1906) ==
- Sir (Jabez) Edward Johnson-Ferguson, 1st Baronet (1849–1929)
- Sir Edward Alexander James Johnson-Ferguson, 2nd Baronet (1875–1953)
- Sir Neil Edward Johnson-Ferguson, 3rd Baronet (1905–1992)
- Sir Ian Edward Johnson-Ferguson, 4th Baronet (1932–2015)
- Sir Mark Edward Johnson-Ferguson, 5th Baronet (born 1965)

The heir presumptive is the present holder's brother Paul Duncan Johnson-Ferguson (born 1966).

== See also ==
- Johnson baronets

== Notes ==
Baronetage of the United Kingdom
Preceded by Spicer baronets	Johnson-Ferguson baronets of Springkell, Kenyon and Wiston; 18 July 1906	Succeeded by Greenwell baronets
