= Stephen Dorrell =

British politician

The Right Honourable Stephen Dorrell
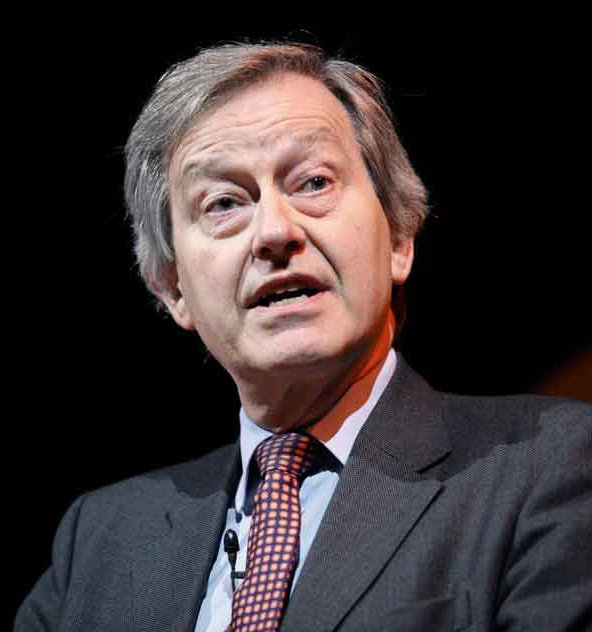
- Dorrell in 2012

Chair of the Health Select Committee
- In office 10 June 2010 – 4 June 2014
- Preceded by: Kevin Barron
- Succeeded by: Sarah Wollaston

Secretary of State for Health
- In office 5 July 1995 – 2 May 1997
- Prime Minister: John Major
- Preceded by: Virginia Bottomley
- Succeeded by: Frank Dobson

Secretary of State for National Heritage
- In office 20 July 1994 – 4 July 1995
- Prime Minister: John Major
- Preceded by: Peter Brooke
- Succeeded by: Virginia Bottomley

Financial Secretary to the Treasury
- In office 14 April 1992 – 19 July 1994
- Prime Minister: John Major
- Preceded by: Francis Maude
- Succeeded by: Sir George Young

Parliamentary Under-Secretary of State for Health
- In office 4 May 1990 – 14 April 1992
- Prime Minister: Margaret Thatcher; John Major
- Preceded by: Roger Freeman
- Succeeded by: Tom Sackville

Lord Commissioner of the Treasury
- In office 20 December 1988 – 3 May 1990
- Prime Minister: Margaret Thatcher
- Preceded by: Tony Durant
- Succeeded by: Michael Fallon
Shadow cabinet posts
Shadow Secretary of State for Education and Employment
In office 11 June 1997 – 2 June 1998
Leader	William Hague
Preceded by	Gillian Shephard
Succeeded by	David Willetts
Shadow Secretary of State for Health
In office 2 May 1997 – 11 June 1997
Leader	John Major
Preceded by	Chris Smith
Succeeded by	John Maples
Parliamentary offices
Member of Parliament for Charnwood
In office 1 May 1997 – 30 March 2015
Preceded by	Constituency established
Succeeded by	Edward Argar
Member of Parliament for Loughborough
In office 3 May 1979 – 8 April 1997
Preceded by	John Cronin
Succeeded by	Andy Reed

Personal details
- Born: 25 March 1952 (age 74) Worcester, England
- Party: Liberal Democrats (2019–present)
- Other political affiliations: Conservative (before 2019); Change UK (2019)
- Spouse: Penelope Taylor
- Education: Brasenose College, Oxford
- Website: Official website

Stephen James Dorrell (born 25 March 1952) is a British politician. He served as the Conservative Member of Parliament (MP) for Loughborough between 1979 and 1997 and then for Charnwood from 1997 to 2015, before joining the Liberal Democrats in 2019.

Dorrell most recently served for four years as Chairman of the House of Commons Health Select Committee from 2010 to 2014. In the 1990s he was a full member of John Major's Cabinet for almost three years, whilst serving as both Secretary of State for National Heritage and then Secretary of State for Health until the 1997 general election. He did not contest the 2015 general election and retired from the House of Commons. Returning to politics in 2019, he left the Conservatives and stood as a Change UK candidate at the 2019 European Parliament election. After failing to be elected, he defected to the Liberal Democrats and was the unsuccessful Liberal Democrat candidate for Buckingham in the 2019 general election.

== Early life and education ==
Dorrell was born in Worcester and educated at Uppingham School, Rutland, and Brasenose College, Oxford, where he was awarded a Bachelor of Arts degree. He was a member of the Royal Air Force Volunteer Reserve for two years from 1971.

== Political career ==
During the February 1974 general election, Dorrell acted as a personal assistant to Conservative minister Peter Walker. Aged only 22, he contested the safe Labour seat of Kingston upon Hull East at the October 1974 general election, but was heavily defeated by the sitting MP (and later Deputy Prime Minister), John Prescott, who was returned with a majority of 25,793 votes.

At the 1979 general election, the Conservatives were returned to office under the leadership of Margaret Thatcher. Dorrell, then 27, was elected to the House of Commons for the marginal seat of Loughborough, ousting the veteran Labour MP John Cronin by 5,199 votes. He remained an MP until standing down from Parliament at the 2015 General Election.

On his election he was the Baby of the House of Commons, an informal title for the youngest member. He was succeeded as the Baby of the House on 9 April 1981 when Bobby Sands was elected at the April 1981 Fermanagh and South Tyrone by-election; however, Sands died on 5 May 1981 whilst on hunger strike in Long Kesh Prison. Dorrell again became the Baby of the House until 20 August 1981, when Sands' successor Owen Carron was elected at the August 1981 Fermanagh and South Tyrone by-election. Dorrell nonetheless remained the youngest MP to take his seat in the House of Commons until the 1983 election, when Charles Kennedy succeeded him—Sands and Carron never took their seats, following the same rationale as Sinn Féin with whom they were closely aligned.

Following his election to Parliament in 1979, Dorrell was a member of the Transport Select committee. After the 1983 general election he was appointed as the Parliamentary Private Secretary to his old boss Peter Walker, who had now become the Secretary of State for Energy.

=== In government ===
Dorrell was promoted to government after the 1987 general election by Prime Minister Margaret Thatcher as an Assistant Government Whip, and in 1988 became a Lord Commissioner to the Treasury—a 'full' whip. He was appointed as the Parliamentary Under Secretary of State at the Department of Health in by Thatcher in 1990, and continued in that role under the premiership of John Major. After the 1992 General Election he became the Financial Secretary to the Treasury.

Dorrell was promoted to the Major Cabinet as the Secretary of State for National Heritage in 1994, and on appointment became a Member of the Privy Council. He headhunted Jennie Page for the job of Millennium Dome Chief Executive according to The Observer. He was transferred to become the Secretary of State for Health in 1995, and remained in position until the end of the Conservative administration at the 1997 general election.

=== After government ===
When constituency boundaries were revised for the 1997 election, he moved with his key rural voters into the new Charnwood constituency. He won the seat comfortably with a majority of 5,900, although Loughborough was lost to Andy Reed of Labour.

He launched a bid for the leadership of the Conservative Party in 1997, but withdrew before the first ballot when it became clear his support amongst Conservative MPs was negligible. Instead he threw his support behind Kenneth Clarke's bid. Under William Hague he became shadow Secretary of State for Education and Employment, but left the shadow cabinet in 1998, and was a backbencher for the remainder of his parliamentary career.

==== Chairman of Health Select Committee and views on NHS reforms ====
In June 2010, Dorrell was elected Chairman of the Health Select Committee. In June 2011, following concerns over the unpopularity of Andrew Lansley's NHS reforms, Dorrell was tipped as a possible successor but stated that he wanted to continue as the committee chairman for the full parliament. An alternate view was that David Cameron would not want any more "Tory retreads" from previous governments. Dorrell acknowledged that resources would become tighter but changes driven by new medicines and new expectations were inevitable and integration of health care and social care would be both better and more efficient.

Interviewed in 2012, Dorrell stated that the 4% per year for four years efficiency targets, agreed before the 2010 election and described as "a huge challenge", were taking too long to achieve. Whilst the bill had good points, e.g. involving clinicians and local authorities, more independence for public health etc. savings required a change in the way care is delivered not just changes in management structure. The reforms were acting as a "disruption and distraction". They were a secondary issue compared with the need to make efficiency savings of £20bn, he added.

Dorrell resigned in June 2014 and was succeeded by Sarah Wollaston.

==== Expenses investigation over "secret flat rent deal" with care home owners ====
In November 2012 Dorrell was reported to the Independent Parliamentary Standards Authority (IPSA) after arranging to sell his London flat to “friends” who owned a chain of nursing homes, subsequently renting it back at £1,400 a month, funded by the taxpayer. His impartiality as chairman was questioned as the Health Select Committee was investigating social care, and some of the chain's nursing homes had been criticised by the Care Quality Commission. Committee members were not aware of the financial connection. David Cameron refused to get involved, saying it was a matter for IPSA. IPSA said that the rules banned MPs from renting from family members, not from friends.

=== Standing down from Parliament ===
In November 2014, he surprised local party members and staff by announcing his future retirement from the House to take a job with consultancy KPMG in "a senior role supporting their health and public service practice...". The role, he said, was "incompatible with seeking re-election to the House of Commons". Fellow Leicestershire Conservative MP Andrew Bridgen also expressed surprise, but said that the prestige of Parliament had fallen since the expenses scandal, and a number of experienced MPs were leaving. Neighbouring Loughborough MP Nicky Morgan described him as "a really important political figure in Leicestershire since 1979. He has been a great support to me". She denied claims she would stand in Dorrell's Charnwood seat (rather than Loughborough) at the 2015 general election, saying that these were "rumour-mongering" by members of the Labour Party. (In May 2015 she held the Loughborough seat with an increased majority.)

The Labour candidate for Charnwood, Sean Kelly Walsh, paid tribute to Dorrell's long service and constituency work, as well as his roles as Secretary of State for Health and chairman of the Health Affairs Select Committee.

=== Resignation call over conflict of interest ===
In December 2014, Dorrell was criticised for alleged conflict of interest when it became clear that he would be working both as an MP and KPMG consultant for six months until the election, and that KPMG were considering bidding for a £1 billion NHS contract. Pointing out that Dorrell had previously admitted the two roles were incompatible, Dr Clive Peedell, co-leader of the National Health Action Party, called for him to resign from one of the posts. Dorrell responded saying no issues were raised as he was not seeking re-election.

In January 2015, a group of six pensioners, who called at Dorrell's offices in Thurmaston to hand in a 2,286 signature petition calling on him to resign, were told they were trespassing and the police would be called. Hanif Asmal, Chairman of Charnwood Conservative Association claimed police were called as the group didn't have an appointment.

According to The Daily Telegraph, Dorrell's extra-parliamentary work took up 1,736 hours, or 33.4 hours per week, in 2014. The Telegraph also stated he voted in 63% of opportunities in Parliament, ranking him 517 out of 650 MPs.

== Criticisms of business practice ==
Dorrell was criticised for his actions when, in 2009, his family-owned firm went into a prepack administration, a "controversial" but legal procedure which the Government's Insolvency Service said was "mocking rules". David Blake, Director of the Cass Business School in London, believes the method is used to dump pension fund liabilities. The controversy may have deterred David Cameron from inviting Dorrell to join the Front Bench. His stake was in clothing company, Faithful, a family business established in the 19th century which made blue collar workwear in Worcester. Finance Director Steve Hall reported the company had been quite profitable until 2004 when it was split between Dorrell and his brother.

By 2005, after loss-making acquisitions, the company pensions deficit was almost £3 million. The pension scheme was changed to money purchase, and the factory site was pledged to support it. However, when the site was sold, some of the money was used to buy another business, and the firm was bought by stock market-listed Wensum. None of the money was paid into the pension scheme. According to Dorrell, the scheme then required 10% of annual turnover, making (debt or equity) restructuring (by financiers) impossible. An independent trustee was appointed, the pension fund received nothing and Wensum continued as a company. In May 2009, Wensum was put into a prepack administration which allowed a new company, GG125, to acquire Wensum's assets for £7.9 million, whilst leaving its debts unpaid.

GG125 was then renamed Wensum Group Limited. The deal was completed in a day, Dorrell receiving a director salary (increased to £200,000 in September 2009) plus 15% share ownership in the new company. As company contributions had ceased, the workers were put into the Pension Protection Fund (PPF), which caps (often reducing) personal payouts and tends to erode with inflation. Hall expected 30–40% pension loss to him as such. Dorrell and his wife had already withdrawn their pensions. Dorrell claimed he had lost £550,000 because of the failure and that the alternative to the prepack would have offered less.

The prepack was criticised as "completely immoral", and inappropriate for listed companies, by a South African creditor, LA group. It had sold a clothing manufacturer to Wensum in May 2009 for Wensum shares which became worthless and ceased after the prepack. Another Wensum shareholder compared the deal to a "spider eviscerating a fly it has caught, taking all the good bits, then dropping the useless carcass, which is the creditors, the shareholders and of course the taxpayer".

== After Parliament ==
He was reckoned by the Health Service Journal to be the 24th most influential person in the English NHS in 2015 after he became Chair of the NHS Confederation.

In 2016 he became Chair of the European Movement UK, succeeding Richard Corbett, in order to lead its campaign to stop Brexit. He stood down in 2021.

In 2018, Dorrell became a committee member of the Tories Against Brexit campaign, which is run by Citizens4Britain.org. He also became the chair of healthcare consultancy LaingBuisson, where he is now a Non Executive Director in addition to being a Director of NHS change consultancy Four Eyes Insight, global policy institute Public Policy Projects and its holding company Dorson Transform, and affiliate Dorson Inform

He became a supporter of Change UK in 2019. He stood for the party in the 2019 European Parliament elections in the constituency of the West Midlands.

Dorrell stood unsuccessfully in the 2019 general election as the Liberal Democrat candidate for Buckingham to succeed former Speaker of the House of Commons John Bercow, having joined the Lib Dems in August from Change UK. He was beaten by the Conservative Greg Smith, who had a majority of over 20,000.

Dorrell stood for the Liberal Democrats at the 2025 Worcestershire County Council election in the ward of Bedwardine. He came sixth out of six candidates; Reform candidate and fellow former Tory MP, Alan Amos, won with 41.47%.

== Personal life ==
Dorrell is married to Penelope Taylor and has three sons and a daughter.

He was a Trustee of Uppingham School and a Governor of Loughborough Endowed Schools. He was Chairman of Trustees at Uppingham from 2008 to 2017.

Parliament of the United Kingdom
Preceded by John Cronin	Member of Parliament for Loughborough; 1979–1997	Succeeded by Andy Reed
New constituency	Member of Parliament for Charnwood; 1997–2015	Succeeded by Edward Argar
Preceded by David Alton	Baby of the House; 1979–1981	Succeeded by Bobby Sands
Preceded by Bobby Sands	Baby of the House; 1981	Succeeded by Owen Carron
Political offices
Preceded by Francis Maude	Financial Secretary to the Treasury; 1992–1994	Succeeded by George Young
Preceded by Peter Brooke	Secretary of State for National Heritage; 1994–1995	Succeeded by Virginia Bottomley
Preceded by Virginia Bottomley	Secretary of State for Health; 1995–1997	Succeeded by Frank Dobson
Preceded by Harriet Harman	Shadow Secretary of State for Health; 1997	Succeeded by John Maples
Preceded by Gillian Shephard	Shadow Secretary of State for Education and Employment; 1997–1998	Succeeded by David Willetts
