= Levy baronets =

Extinct baronetcy in the Baronetage of the United Kingdom

Escutcheon of the Levy baronets of Humberstone Hall

The Levy baronetcy, of Humberstone Hall in the County of Leicester, was a title in the Baronetage of the United Kingdom. It was created on 4 February 1913 for Sir Maurice Levy, Member of Parliament for Loughborough from 1900 to 1918. He had been knighted in 1907.

The 2nd Baronet served as High Sheriff of Leicestershire from 1937 to 1938. The title became extinct on his death in 1996.

== Levy baronets, of Humberstone Hall (1913) ==
- Sir Maurice Levy, 1st Baronet (1859–1933)
- Sir Ewart Maurice Levy, 2nd Baronet (1897–1996), left no male heir.

== Extended family ==
- Arthur Lever, younger brother of the 1st Baronet who had assumed the surname Lever), was created a baronet in 1911 (see Lever baronets).

Baronetage of the United Kingdom
Preceded by Scott baronets	Levy baronets of Humberstone Hall; 4 February 1913	Succeeded by Crisp baronets
