= Avril Lennox =

British gymnast (born 1956)

Personal information
- Nationality: British
- Born: 26 April 1956 (age 68); Leicester, England

Sport
- Sport: Gymnastics

Avril Lennox (born 26 April 1956) is a British gymnast. She competed at the 1972 Summer Olympics and the 1976 Summer Olympics.

== Early life ==
She lived on Curzon Avenue in Birstall. She attended Stonehill High School until the age of 14, then Longslade Community College. She studied Textile Design at Leicester Polytechnic, and trained in the gym at Charles Keene College.

== Career ==
She had an ankle injury in 1977 and had to leave gymnastics. Gymnastics was introduced into the Commonwealth Games in 1978.

== Personal life ==
She gave birth to a son in July 1985 at Leicester General Hospital.
