= Andy Reed (politician) =

British politician (born 1964)

Andy Reed OBE
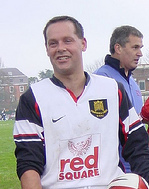
- Reed in 2010

Member of Parliament for Loughborough
- In office 1 May 1997 – 12 April 2010
- Preceded by: Stephen Dorrell
- Succeeded by: Nicky Morgan

Personal details
- Born: 17 September 1964 (age 62) Kettering, Northamptonshire, England
- Party: Labour Co-operative
- Education: De Montfort University

Andrew John Reed OBE (born 17 September 1964) is a British Labour Co-operative politician who was the Member of Parliament for the key marginal Constituency of Loughborough from 1997 to 2010. Reed was awarded the OBE in June 2012 for service to the community and sport in Leicestershire.

A sports enthusiast, his constituency was home to the headquarters for Team GB's 2012 Olympic preparation, whose requirements Reed became familiar with under the Parliamentary Sports Fellowship Scheme. Although regarded as a loyal MP, Reed was the first member of the Government to resign over the invasion of Iraq.

== Background ==
Reed was brought up and educated in Leicestershire, spending the first two years of his life on the Netherhall Estate in Leicester before moving to Birstall. He attended Riverside Junior School (now a primary school), Stonehill High School and Longslade Community College, all in Birstall, Charnwood and then completed a BA (Hons) degree in Public Administration at Leicester Polytechnic (now called De Montfort University).

He joined the Labour Party in 1983/84, and was elected in 1987 as a Parish Councillor, a position held until 1991. Reed worked as a Parliamentary assistant to Keith Vaz from 1987 until 1988, when he joined Leicester City Council, working first in Urban Regeneration on the Inner Area Programme and later as a Project Officer for Recreation & Arts. He joined Leicestershire County Council in 1990 as an Employment Officer in the Employment Initiatives Team moving to the Economic Development Section where he dealt with voluntary sector employment projects before becoming European Affairs Officer in 1994–97. Reed was the East Midlands coordinator for John Smith's 1992 leadership campaign. He was elected to the Sileby Ward of Charnwood Borough Council in May 1995.

In the late 1980s/early 1990s, he served as a School governor first at Stonehill High Birstall, then at Highgate Primary School in Sileby.

He married Sarah Elizabeth Chester in August 1992 at Glenfield Methodist church Leicestershire and lives in Quorn in the Loughborough constituency with Sarah and their son James Kyran (born 12 March 1999) and daughter Emily Grace (born 19 March 2002).

== Career as an MP ==
Reed first stood for Loughborough in 1992. His 1997 election followed boundary changes which saw the previous incumbent, Conservative Health Secretary Stephen Dorrell move with his key rural voters to the newly created Charnwood constituency.

Prior to the 2001 election Reed served as a Parliamentary Private Secretary (PPS) to the Culture, Media and Sport ministerial team, working with Chris Smith, Alan Howarth, Janet Anderson and Minister for Sport Kate Hoey. In 2001 he was returned with an increased majority of 6,300 and became the PPS to Environment Secretary Margaret Beckett, but resigned in 2003 in protest at the Government's decision to support a US-led invasion of Iraq without a United Nations resolution.

He retained his seat in the 2005 election but with a reduced majority of 1,996, and was recalled to the Government to be a PPS to the Treasury ministerial team, working with the Paymaster General, Dawn Primarolo.

He stood down from the role of PPS in 2007 when Gordon Brown became Leader of the Labour Party to return to the backbenches as a member of parliament. Reed said that he would not seek Ministerial Office again.

Reed was a member of various All-Party Parliamentary Groups and was an officer in the following: Bermuda–Britain (Secretary), Athletics (Treasurer), Balanced and Sustainable Communities (Treasurer), Christians in Parliament (Vice Chair), Debt, Aid & Trade (Treasurer/Secretary), East Midlands Rail Franchise (Treasurer), Health and Wellbeing in Schools (Vice Chair), Hockey (Vice Chair), Leisure (Vice Chair), Rugby Union (joint vice-chair), Scout (Vice Chair), and Sports (Secretary). He was also Chair of the Sports Caucus, a small group of MPs with a common interest in sport. He captained the winning House of Commons swimming team in the Lords vs. Commons swimming gala in 2000, 2002 and 2004.

According to TheyWorkForYou, in his last year in Parliament Reed had spoken in an "above average" number of debates, voted an "above average" number of times in the 2005–2010 parliament and replied "within 2 or 3 weeks" to a "high number of messages" during 2008. His most frequent questions related to the Olympics, Hearing Impairment, Physical Activity, Education Funding and Sunday Trading. Sport was referred to over 100 times, often in relation to young people and a healthy lifestyle.

=== Party loyalty ===
In The Guardian newspaper, Andrew Roth described Reed as an "Over eager Blair loyalist and stooge questioner" and his Parliamentary voting record -as would be expected from a "largely loyal" MP -has generally been in support of the Government.

His overall record at the Public Whip shows he "occasionally rebels", with 26 votes out of 2791 being deemed against the party whip.

=== Iraq ===
In February 2003, he voted both ways, a common method of showing active abstention, to amend a motion which supported Government policy on Iraq so that it also stated that the case for military action against Iraq was as yet unproven.

On 9 March, he resigned over the imminent invasion of Iraq though his website made it clear that he supported continued efforts to find a solution through the United Nations.

In the final vote of the House of Commons on 18 March 2003, Reed abstained on an amendment declaring "that the case for war against Iraq has not yet been established, especially given the absence of specific United Nations authorisation", but then went on to support the Government motion which declared that the United Nations authority to use force had revived and supporting "the decision of Her Majesty's Government that the United Kingdom should use all means necessary to ensure the disarmament of Iraq's weapons of mass destruction".

This was his last rebellion on this issue. On 9 March 2004 he voted to reject the motion calling for immediate publication of all advice prepared by the Attorney-General, it was subsequently published in April 2005 and in March 2008 he voted to delay an inquiry whilst important operations were underway. The Iraq Inquiry was announced in June 2009.

=== Gurkhas Settlement Rights ===
In April 2009, Reed voted against the Government for a motion supporting the Gurkhas' rights to settle in the UK on which the Government was defeated.

=== Expenses claims ===
Reed's total 2008–2009 constituency expenses of £159,409 were the 204th highest out of 647 MPs. Over 75% of this was staff and office costs. In 2008–09 the total cost of Reed's "Staying away from main home" was £20,387, the 299th highest.

Reed "came through the scandal ..over MPs' expenses unscathed", although in May 2009, The Daily Telegraph wrongly implied a discrepancy between claims for Reed's second home in Westminster and what he told constituents.

"Andy Reed has a flat as second home in Westminster. In 2007, claimed £1,180 for the flat but this fell to £727 for a mortgage interest payment in 2008. Website states he claims about £450 per month in mortgage interest payments."

A Loughborough Echo investigation showed Reed lived "in a small one bedroom flat" and the difference was due to utility bills, council tax and a quarterly service charge, a total cost of £807 per month and already well within the £1,450 a month limit introduced a year later in the wake of the scandal. The Echo revealed that Reed had claimed £991 for home entertainment equipment. Reed told the paper, "Is it necessary? Probably not, but at the time it is what I had... In hindsight, would I do it in today's climate? No."

The Legg Report showed that 343 MPs had been asked to repay some money, including several from Leicestershire.

In Reed's case it was because of an accounting error by the Fees office and the amount was outstanding at publication on 4 February 2010. Reed told the Leicester Mercury: "The Fees Office made a mistake in the past and paid my service charge twice – so I have paid back £891. The problem arose when they wrote and said they would withhold a proportion of my expenses for a month because they had lost an invoice for the service charge."

== Sports ==
Reed has a keen interest in playing sports and encouraging others to do so. The "sports mad MP" persuaded MPs to run a mile in support of Sport Relief. He is the President of the Birstall Rugby union Club based at Longslade Community College where he still plays rugby regularly. He chaired East Midlands Sport in 2000–3. He has been chair of the board of the County Sports Partnership for Leicestershire since 2004 and also Chairs the National Strategic Partnership for Volunteers in Sport.

== Notes ==
Parliament of the United Kingdom
Preceded by Stephen Dorrell	Member of Parliament for Loughborough; 1997 – 2010	Succeeded by Nicky Morgan
