= John Cronin (British politician) =

British politician

- Cronin reading Hansard in his Wimpole Street consulting room in 1967

Member of Parliament for Loughborough
- In office 26 May 1955 – 7 April 1979
- Preceded by: Mont Follick
- Succeeded by: Stephen Dorrell

Member of London County Council for Fulham East
- In office 1952–1955

Personal details
- Born: John Desmond Cronin; 1 March 1916
- Died: 3 January 1986 (aged 69)
- Party: Labour

John Desmond Cronin (1 March 1916 – 3 January 1986) was a British surgeon and Labour Party politician.

== Early life and education ==
He was born in Simla, British India (since 1947 known as Shimla), the summer capital of India in the days of the British Raj. The family, like many others living in India at the time, had moved there to escape the heat and disease of India's lower altitudes during the summer months. His father, John Patrick Cronin (1889–1952), a director of Lever Brothers, was Lord Leverhulme's representative in India and later Chairman of Horlicks, Australia.

Cronin spent the first three years of his life in India until the family returned to their home in Hornsey Lane, Highgate, London in 1919. In 1929, the family moved to Woodside Park near Totteridge in North East Finchley. Cronin was educated at St Aloysius' College in Highgate from 1923 to 1924, then at Hodder House, the preparatory school for Stonyhurst College in Clitheroe, Lancashire, from 1924 to 1930 before going on to Stonyhurst where he studied until 1933.

Cronin wanted to join the Royal Navy, but his father decided he was to have a career in medicine, and sent him to St Bartholomew's Hospital Medical College. He became a Licentiate of the Royal College of Surgeons in 1939, and received a Bachelor of Medicine and a Bachelor of Surgery in 1940. He was the Resident Surgeon at Grimsby and District Hospital from 1940 to 1941.

== Wartime and medical career ==
Cronin became surgical registrar and surgeon in the Emergency Medical Service at the Royal Free Hospital. He joined the army in 1942, serving as a lieutenant in the Royal Army Medical Corps and was made a graded surgeon after a few months spent as a general duty officer. He commanded 50 pioneers in the Normandy landings in 1944 and later worked as a surgeon just outside Caen. He was posted to India at the end of 1944 and was promoted in 1945 to major and then to acting lieutenant colonel. He then served in Burma, working with the forward troops before returning to England in 1946 to live in Regents Park Road near Regent's Park, London; he had at that time a consulting room in Harley Street.

In 1947, he passed the examinations to become a fellow of the Royal College of Surgeons and was appointed as assistant orthopaedic surgeon at the Prince of Wales Hospital later that year. In 1948, he was appointed orthopaedic surgeon at the French Hospital.

By this time Cronin had a home and his own consulting room in Wimpole Street. A fluent speaker of French, Cronin was first made an Officier of the Légion d'honneur and, in 1967, a Chevalier in recognition of his services. He also became an expert in industrial injuries and from the 1950s he was regularly an expert witness in personal injury cases. He was a founding Director of Racal Electronics Ltd from 1965 until his death in 1986.

== Political career ==
In 1948, Cronin joined the Labour Party. He became vice chairman of the North St Pancras Labour Party in 1950, and was a member of London County Council, representing Fulham East, from 1952 to 1955. In 1955 he was elected Member of Parliament (MP) for Loughborough, representing the Labour Party. He was an Opposition Whip in the House of Commons from 1959 to 1962.

A man believing in socialist principles, Cronin was a close friend of Hugh Gaitskell and Roy Jenkins. He rose to become the Shadow Minister of State for Aviation in 1962. On 18 November, while taking part in a scheme for Parliamentarians to visit Royal Navy ship at sea, he was one of three survivors from a Wessex helicopter belonging to HMS Hermes which crashed off St David's Head.

In 1965, he was offered a peerage; Harold Wilson used George Brown as his intermediary, but Cronin declined, telling Brown that the House of Commons was the best club in the country, and he was reluctant to leave it. He went on to hold his Loughborough seat until 1979 when he was beaten by the Conservative Stephen Dorrell.

== Personal life and family ==
Cronin became a member of Brooks's, a political club in St James's Street, in 1984 having been proposed as a member by Roy Jenkins. A keen sportsman who hunted when young and regularly rode Household Cavalry horses in Hyde Park, he also played polo, squash and tennis. Cronin was an enthusiastic yachtsman — a member of the Royal Lymington Yacht Club, based in Hampshire, he sailed regularly and was Commodore of the House of Commons Yacht Club. His yacht, named Hardie after the founder of the Labour party, was a 17 ton Bermudian rigged sloop and won the Cowes to Cherbourg yacht race with Cronin at the helm.

He married Cora Mumby-Croft in 1941 and they had three children: Anne Olivia born in 1942, who married Piers Dixon, Conservative MP for Truro 1970–1974, and son of Sir Pierson Dixon, GCMG, Ambassador to France 1960–1964. Pauline Margaret Cronin was born in 1944, and married Stephen Clarke, the son of Bernard and Doris Clarke. Charles John Cronin was born in 1961 and married Jane Hockey; Charles served on Westminster City Council as a Conservative from 1998 to 2002.

Cronin died on 3 January 1986, aged 69, whilst out riding in the New Forest in Hampshire. In the late afternoon his horse returned home without him: it was feared he might have been thrown and that he could be lying badly injured in freezing weather conditions. The Forest Verderers were sent out and found him dead on a forest path, not far from his home at Stoney Cross. A post mortem later found that he had died of a massive heart attack and stroke. His funeral was held at Minstead Church and Sir Ernie Harrison, Chairman of Racal and a close friend, made a valedictory speech from the pulpit during the service. Cronin lies buried in Minstead Church graveyard.

Parliament of the United Kingdom
Preceded by Mont Follick	Member of Parliament for Loughborough; 1955–1979	Succeeded by Stephen Dorrell
