= Lawrence Kimball =

British politician (1900–1971)

Major Lawrence Kimball (25 October 1900 – 30 December 1971) was a Conservative Party politician who served as the Member of Parliament for Loughborough between 1931 and 1945.

== Early life ==
Lawrence Kimball, born in 1900, was the second son of Marcus Morton Kimball and Jeannie Lawrence Perkins of Park Meadow House of Pomfret, Connecticut.

He was educated abroad and at Gonville and Caius College, Cambridge.

== Career ==
In 1926, he was called to the bar at Gray's Inn, and five years later was made Sheriff of Rutland. That same year, he was elected to represent Loughborough in the House of Commons, defeating the sitting Labour MP, George Winterton. Kimball himself lost the seat by nearly 9,000 votes to Labour's Mont Follick in 1945, and afterwards retired to the family estate in Salisbury, Wiltshire.

== Personal life ==
He was married on Tuesday March 22, 1927 at the Church of St John the Baptist, Stanford on Soar to (Kathleen) Joan Ratcliff, daughter of Richard Henry Ratcliff and Caroline Christine Lee (1873–1950), the daughter of Conservative MP Vaughan Vaughan-Lee. Joan later lived at Dalby Hall, Leicestershire, and died in 1963.

He would be the father of Marcus, Lord Kimball.
