= Mont Follick =

British politician and linguist

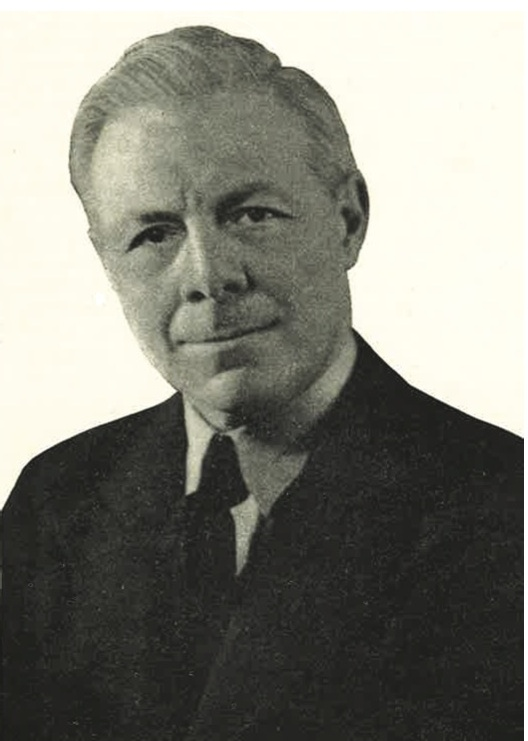
Mont Follick MP for Loughborough 1945-1955

Montefiore Follick (31 December 1887 – 10 December 1958) was a British Labour Party politician, a campaigner for spelling reform, polyglot and advocate of decimal currency. He was Member of Parliament (MP) for Loughborough from 1945 to 1955, having previously held the post of Professor of English at the University of Madrid in Spain. He had been adopted by the Loughborough Labour Party in 1936 as prospective parliamentary candidate but had a long wait because of the war years before being elected. In 1949 and again in 1952 he introduced private member's bills in the UK parliament for the reform of English spelling. He also bought the Loughborough Labour Party's current Building Unity House in 1947.

Follick was born in Cardiff and educated at the Sorbonne, Halle (Dr Phil) and Padua. His family was Jewish, and he was named after Sir Moses Montefiore. He served as secretary to the Aga Khan, Sir Robert Philp (Premier of Queensland) and Mulay Hafid (Sultan of Morocco). He stood unsuccessfully for the Parliamentary constituencies of Ashford (1929), East Surrey (1931) and Fulham West (1935) before his successful bid for Loughborough in 1945.

Follick was also the founder and proprietor of the Regent School of Languages (destroyed by enemy action, but now part of the University of Westminster). On his death, he bequeathed the substantial sums raised by this venture to found and endow a professor's chair of Comparative Philology "in which spelling reform (not merely the teaching of reading) should form a principal part". The bequest was finally accepted by the University of Manchester, and a chair bearing Follick's name is still in existence.

His publications include The Adam’s Lottery, 1919; Influence of English, 1934; Facing Facts, 1935; Efforts of Chance, 1938; English Grammar for Foreigners, 11 editions; and The Twelve Republics, 1952. In his book "Facing Facts", (started in 1932) Follick accurately foretold the aggressions of Germany and the Japanese invasion of China. The book started with the words "Beware Europe" and ended with "You have been warned". The Case for Spelling Reform was published posthumously in 1965 by Sir Isaac Pitman & Sons; on p. v are the phrases "To the schoolchildren of Britain a consistent alphabet; To the nations of the world an international language".

Follick was a member of the Fabian Society, and fellow of the Royal Geographical Society, and of the Royal Society of Arts. He was also the inventor and patentee of the Geodok system of teaching geography.

== Proposed spelling ==
Follick’s proposed English spelling removed q, x and y, while giving all the remaining letters their most usual sound value in English and adding standardized use of the digraphs dh and zh, as well as the trigraph tsh.

=== Rules ===
Follick's system is completely phonemic to the extent of using '-t' for traditional '-ed' when unvoiced (as in 'poazt'), and '-d' when voiced (as in 'ruumerd').

=== Sound-to-spelling correspondences ===
Vowels
Lexical set	Letters	Proposed spellings	Traditional spellings
TRAP	a	azhiur	azure
DRESS	e	ten	ten
KIT	i	intuu	into
LOT	o	lot	lot
STRUT	u	mutsh	much
commA	u	dhu	the
THOUGHT	oa	poazt	paused
FLEECE	ie	shie fieling	she feeling
FACE	ei	pein	pain
FACE	ai	waild	wild
DUE	iu	dispiut	dispute
GOOSE	uu	intuu	into
GOOSE	uu	ruumerd	rumoured
PRICE	ie	hie	he
CHOICE	oi	emploiment	employment
GOAT	ou	ouver	over
MOUTH	au	hau	how
CURE	iur	azhiur	azure
START	aa	Maarz	Mars
lettER	er	ouver	over

Consonants
Fortis	Letters	Lenis	Letters
/p/	p	/b/	b
/t/	t	/d/	d
/k/	k	/ɡ/	g
/tʃ/	tsh (was ch)	/dʒ/	j
/f/	f	/v/	v
/θ/	th	/ð/	dh (was th)
/s/	s	/z/	z
/ʃ/	sh	/ʒ/	zh (was various)
/h/	h		
		/m/	m
		/n/	n
		/ŋ/	ng
		/j/	?
		/w/	w
		/r/	r
		/l/	l

Parliament of the United Kingdom
Preceded by Lawrence Kimball	Member of Parliament for Loughborough; 1945 – 1955	Succeeded by John Cronin
