= The Cedars Academy =

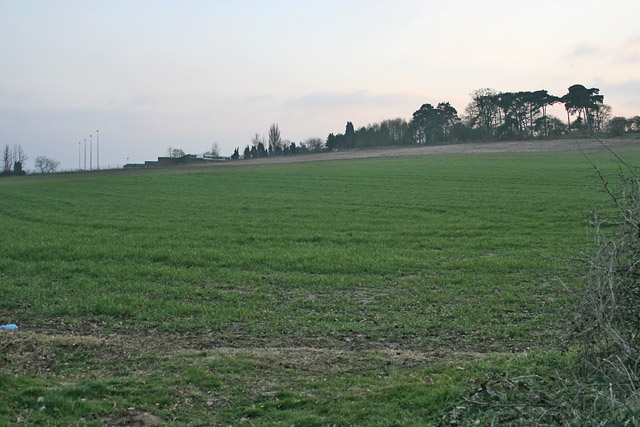

Location
- Wanlip Lane; Birstall, Leicestershire, LE4 4GH; England; 52°41′09″N 1°07′14″W

Information
- Type: Academy
- Established: 1959
- Local authority: Leicestershire
- Department for Education URN: 140787 Tables
- Ofsted: Reports
- Executive Headteacher: Laura Sanchez
- Headteacher: James Rolfe
- Gender: Co-educational
- Age: 11 to 18
- Colour: Blue
- Website: http://www.thecedarsacademy.org.uk/

The Cedars Academy is a co-educational secondary school and sixth form located in Birstall in the English county of Leicestershire.

== History ==
The school opened in 1959 as the Longslade Grammar School, which became a comprehensive before 1966. Longslade was created at a time of innovation in Leicestershire with regard to education. Leicestershire had created what was to be known as the Leicestershire Plan. Education authorities are not renowned from learning from each other but Leicestershire received delegations from half of the other authorities in England as well as attention from the US to see the novel changes in Educational policy that they introduced.

The school population in Leicestershire was expanding. In 1948 there were just under 44,000 children in Leicestershire but this had expanded to over 72,000 by 1968. This was not just population growth but movement from Leicester to the outlying suburbs like Oadby, Wigston and included in this list was Birstall. The county was setting out on what was to be known as the Leicestershire plan for comprehensive education. Where other schools in England were converting existing grammar schools and secondary modern schools to comprehensive education by changing their intake, Leicestershire decided to change the age of entry. Some schools were converted into what they called high schools that served ages 11 to 14 whilst others were converted into upper schools that educated children from age 14 to 18. This idea had been tried out experimentally in Oadby and Wigston in 1957 and the second phase was in 1960 taking in high schools in Scraptoft (Hamilton High), Thurmaston and with both a high and upper school on the new site between Birstall and Wanlip.

Previously a community school administered by Leicestershire County Council, in 2015 Longslade Community College converted to academy status and was renamed The Cedars Academy. At the same time the school expanded its age range to 11, becoming a full secondary school. This resulted in the closure of Stonehill High School.

== Admissions ==
The school serves a large catchment area including the villages of Anstey, Birstall, Cropston, Glenfield, Rothley, Thurcaston and Wanlip.

The school also provides adult education and special needs education.

== Academic performance ==
For a number of years, its results were well below average. The Ofsted report in June 2013 deemed the school inadequate in achievement of pupils, quality of teaching, behaviour and safety of pupils and leadership and management. Despite this, in August 2013 Longslade recorded their best GCSE results ever with students achieving 60% A*–C including English and Maths -in line with the county average.

== Notable former pupils ==
=== Longslade Community College ===
- Prof Sir Paul Curran (1955– ) NASA scientist, President since 2010 of City, University of London and Professor of Geography
- Dan Greaves (athlete), paralympics discus thrower
- Jay Hulme, poet
- Scott Oakes, Luton Town footballer
- Stefan Oakes, footballer, brother of Scott
- Andy Reed Labour MP from 1997–2010 for Loughborough (1964– ), and Chairman since 2011 of the Sport and Recreation Alliance

=== Longslade Upper School ===
- Ian Bolton, footballer
- Nic Dakin, Labour MP since 2010 for Scunthorpe, and Leader of North Lincolnshire Council from 1997–2003
- Mike Hendrick – England and Derbyshire cricketer
- Carol Leader – actress and television presenter of Play School
- David Nelson, architect and Joint Head of Design at Foster and Partners, designed Canary Wharf tube station, the McLaren Technology Centre, and the American Air Museum at Duxford Aerodrome
- Brian Adams, international race Walker. Finished 11th in the 20 km Walk at the Montreal Olympics 1976 and 6th in the 1975 World Cup 20 km.
- Peter Simons, philosopher
