= Ernest Winterton =

British politician and journalist

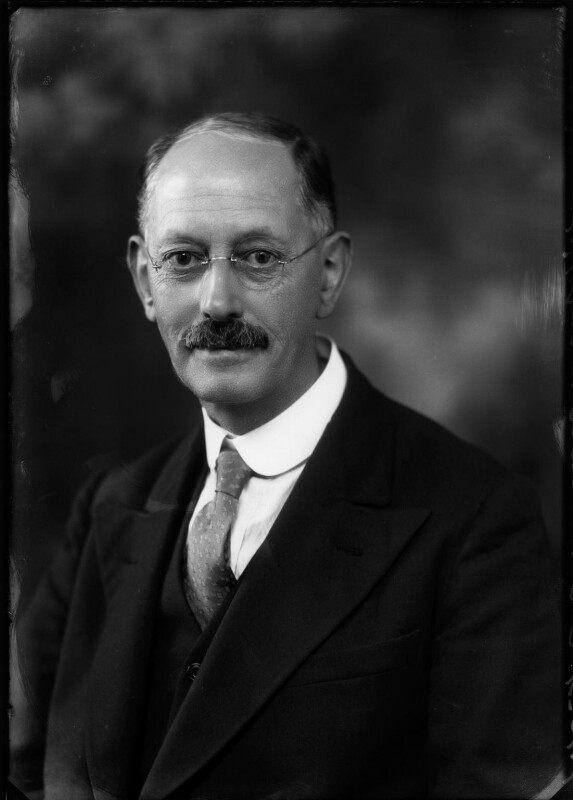
Winterton in 1931

George Ernest Winterton (17 May 1873 – 15 May 1942) was a British politician and journalist.

Born in Oadby in Leicestershire, Winterton was educated locally, then at the Borough Road College in Isleworth, where he qualified as a teacher. He became involved in the temperance movement, and also concerned about the conduct of the police. After working in teaching, in 1920, he became a journalist on the Daily Herald, spending nine years at the paper.

Winterton joined the Independent Labour Party (ILP) in 1911, and in 1917 he founded a new branch in Richmond-upon-Thames. The ILP was affiliated to the Labour Party, for which he stood unsuccessfully in Loughborough at the 1923 and 1924 general elections, before finally winning the seat in 1929. He then lost at the 1931 general election, and failed to win the seat back in 1935.

He was father of the journalist and crime fiction author, Paul Winterton.

Parliament of the United Kingdom
Preceded by Frank Rye	Member of Parliament for Loughborough; 1929 – 1931	Succeeded by Lawrence Kimball
