= Sir Maurice Levy, 1st Baronet =

British politician (1859–1933)

Sir Maurice Levy, Bt JP DL
- Sir Maurice Levy, 1916

Member of Parliament for Loughborough
- In office 1900–1918
- Preceded by: Edward Johnson-Ferguson
- Succeeded by: Oscar Guest

Personal details
- Born: 9 June 1859 Leicester
- Died: 26 August 1933 (aged 74) Brighton
- Party: Liberal
- Spouse: Elise Zossenheim (after 1885)
- Relations: Arthur Lever (brother)
- Children: 5
- Education: London University

Sir Maurice Levy, 1st Baronet, JP, DL (9 June 1859 – 26 August 1933) was a British Liberal Party politician.

== Early life ==
Levy was born in 1859 in Leicester. He was the second son of Joseph Levy of Leicester and elder brother of Arthur Lever, who was also a Liberal MP and educated at London University.

== Career ==
He was Managing Director of Hart and Levy (Limited), wholesale merchants and manufacturers, of Leicester and London.

He was Liberal MP for the Loughborough Division of Leicestershire from 1900 to 1918, first contesting the seat as the Liberal candidate at the 1900 General Election when he narrowly held the seat for the Liberals. He was active in parliament opposing the Aliens Act 1905 which sought to restrict Jewish immigration from eastern Europe. He was re-elected at the following three general elections. He was knighted in 1907 and created first Levy Baronet, of Humberstone Hall in the County of Leicester, in 1913. During the First World War he worked under David Lloyd George at the Ministry of Munitions and was a member of Lloyd George's special trade mission to Ireland.

He retired from parliament without contesting the 1918 general election and became a Justice of the Peace in the County of Leicester. He was appointed a Deputy Lieutenant for Leicestershire and served as High Sheriff of Leicestershire for 1926–27.

== Personal life ==
In 1885, Levy was married to Elise Ray Zossenheim, a daughter of Max Zossenheim, of Leeds and Harrogate, and they lived at Humberstone Hall in Humberstone, Leicester. Together, they had one son and four daughters:

- Violet Ray (1887–1972)
- Doris Pamela(1891–1988), who married Sir Henry Spencer Moreton Havelock-Allan, 2nd Baronet, in December 1937. She was appointed Serving Sister, Most Venerable Order of the Hospital of St. John of Jerusalem in 1971.
- Alix Cordelia (1894–1996)
- Sir Ewart Maurice Levy, 2nd Baronet (1897–1996), who married Hylda Levy, a daughter of Sir Albert Levy, founder of the Ardath Tobacco Company, Ltd., and one of Britain's best known philanthropists, in 1932.
- Norah Sybil Charlotte (1899-), married firstly Sir John Richard Duckworth-King, 7th Baronet, in 1921, and secondly Captain Kenneth Frederick Every Woods in 1945.

Sir Maurice died on 26 August 1933 while on holiday at Brighton and was buried at Golders Green.

Parliament of the United Kingdom
Preceded by Edward Johnson-Ferguson	Member of Parliament for Loughborough; 1900–1918	Succeeded by Oscar Guest
Baronetage of the United Kingdom
New creation	Baronet (of Humberstone Hall); 1913–1933	Succeeded by Ewart Levy
