= Edwin de Lisle =

Edwin Joseph Lisle March Philipps de Lisle, DL FSA (13 June 1852 – 5 May 1920) was a Conservative member of parliament for Loughborough in England from 1886 to 1892. He was the seventh son of Ambrose Lisle March Phillipps De Lisle and Laura Maria Clifford.

A Catholic, he studied at St. Mary's College, Oscott (as did his brothers Ambrose (a JP), Everard (awarded VC), Osmund, Francis, Rudolph and Gerard), where he was awarded a Good conduct medal in 1872. Apart from being MP for Mid-Leicestershire he also held office as Leicestershire's Deputy Lieutenant.

Edwin de Lisle spent all his life in Leicestershire, living at Charnwood Lodge with his wife, Agnes Henrietta Ida Hope, and their eight children.

A stained-glass window dedicated to his memory is located on the East side of Arundel Cathedral.

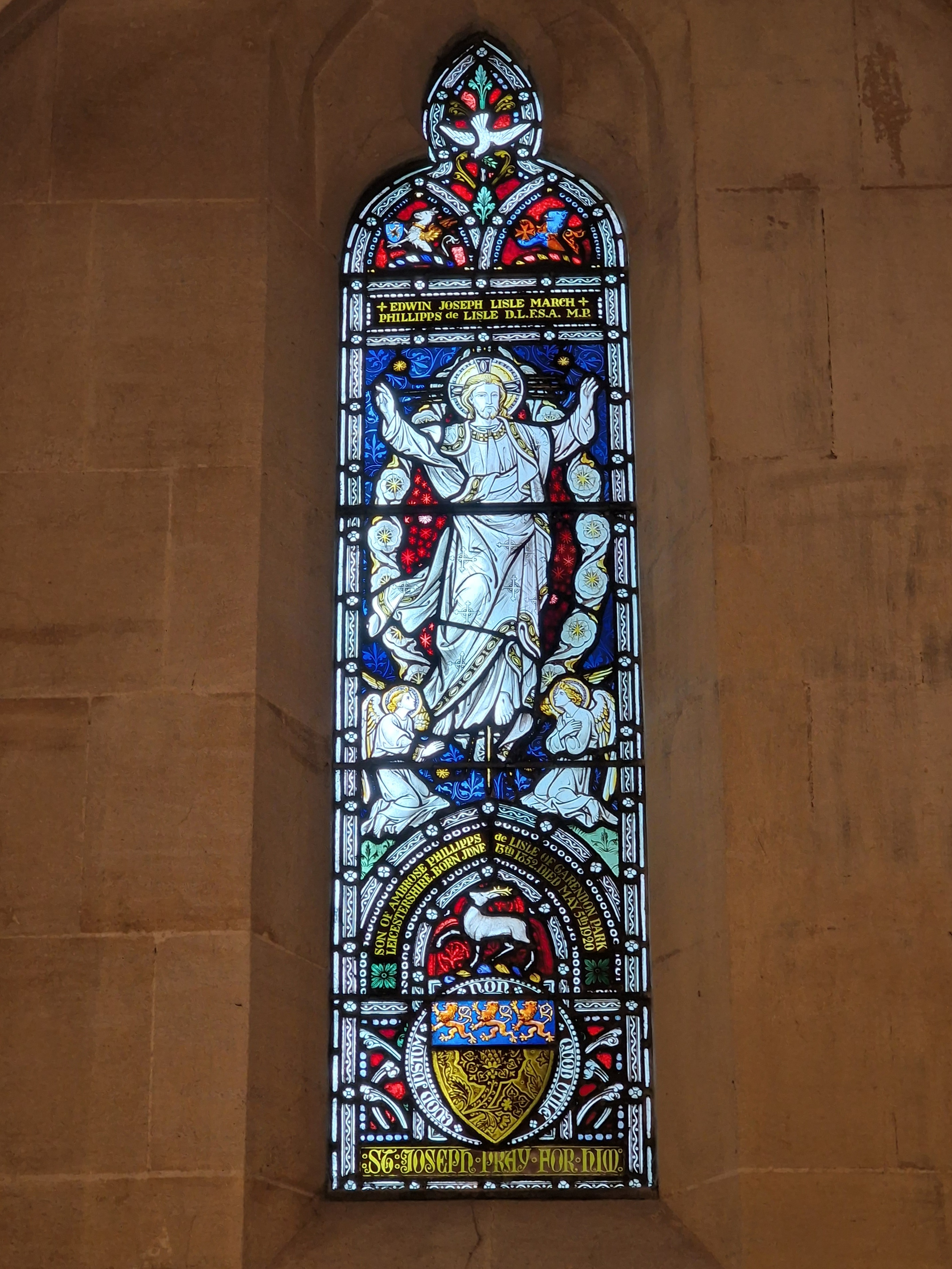

Parliament of the United Kingdom
Preceded by Edward Johnson-Ferguson	Member of Parliament for Loughborough; 1886–1892	Succeeded by Edward Johnson-Ferguson
