= Jane Hunt (British politician) =

British politician (born 1966)

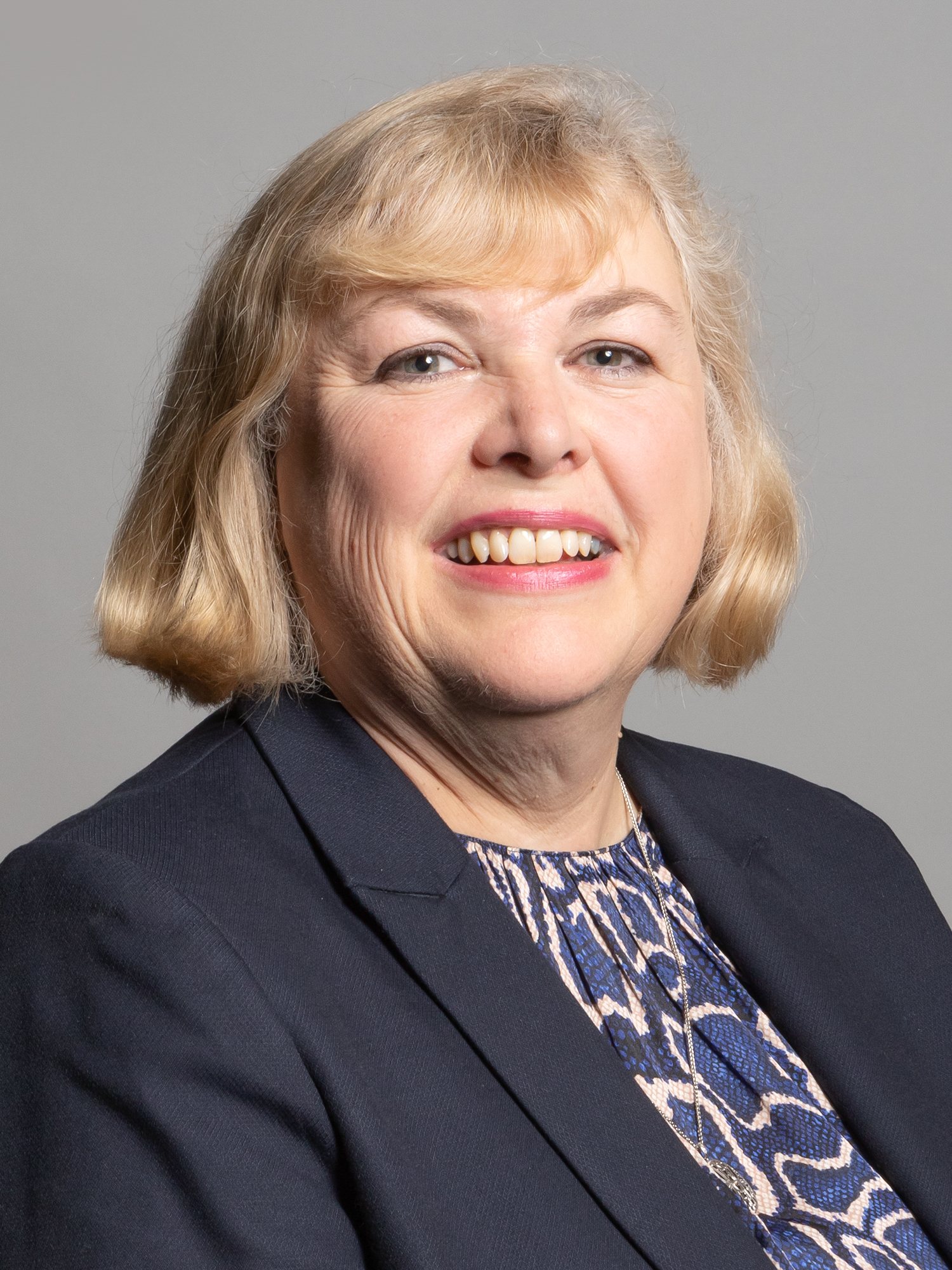
- Official portrait, 2020

Parliamentary Under-Secretary of State for Small Business, Consumers and Labour Markets
- In office 8 July 2022 – 8 September 2022
- Prime Minister: Boris Johnson
- Preceded by: Paul Scully
- Succeeded by: Dean Russell

Member of Parliament for Loughborough
- In office 12 December 2019 – 30 May 2024
- Preceded by: Nicky Morgan
- Succeeded by: Jeevun Sandher

Personal details
- Born: 4 June 1966 (age 60)
- Party: Conservative
- Children: 2

Jane Marion Hunt (born 4 June 1966) is a British politician who was the Member of Parliament (MP) for Loughborough in Leicestershire between 2019 and 2024. A member of the Conservative Party, she briefly served as Parliamentary Under-Secretary of State for Small Business, Consumers and Labour Markets from July to September 2022 under Prime Minister Boris Johnson following the July 2022 government crisis. She lost her seat to Labour's Jeevun Sandher in the 2024 election.

== Career ==
Hunt served on Charnwood Borough Council from 2003 until 2015 for Loughborough Nanpantan, and from 2018 for Quorn and Mountsorrel Castle. She worked as an adviser to her predecessor, Nicky Morgan, in Morgan's role as MP for Loughborough from 2010 to 2019. She was the unsuccessful Conservative prospective parliamentary candidate for several safe Labour seats prior to 2019, initially contesting Leicester East at the 2010 general election and the neighbouring Leicester South at the 2011 by-election. She also unsuccessfully contested Nottingham South at the 2015 and 2017 general elections. Hunt finished second in all bar one of the contests, coming third in Leicester South behind the Liberal Democrats.

Hunt was elected at the 2019 general election; it was her fourth attempt to enter Parliament. She made her maiden speech to the House of Commons on 20 January 2020. She was appointed Parliamentary Private Secretary to the Cabinet Office. On 8 July 2022 she was appointed Parliamentary Under-Secretary of State for Small Business, Consumers and Labour Markets. She left office when Liz Truss became Prime Minister.

In October 2022, following the resignation of Truss, Hunt announced that she would be supporting previous Prime Minister Boris Johnson in the subsequent leadership election.

Hunt was defeated by Jeevun Sandher of Labour in the 2024 general election.

== Personal life ==
Hunt is married and has two children. In April 2024, Hunt thanked medics at the Leicester Royal Infirmary after having chemotherapy following her diagnosis with bowel cancer.

Parliament of the United Kingdom
Preceded by Nicky Morgan	Member of Parliament for Loughborough; 2019-2024	Succeeded by Jeevun Sandher
Preceded by Paul Scully	Parliamentary Under-Secretary of State for Small Business, Consumers and Labour Markets; July 2022- September 2022	Succeeded by Dean Russell
