= Jay Hulme =

English performance poet (born 1997)

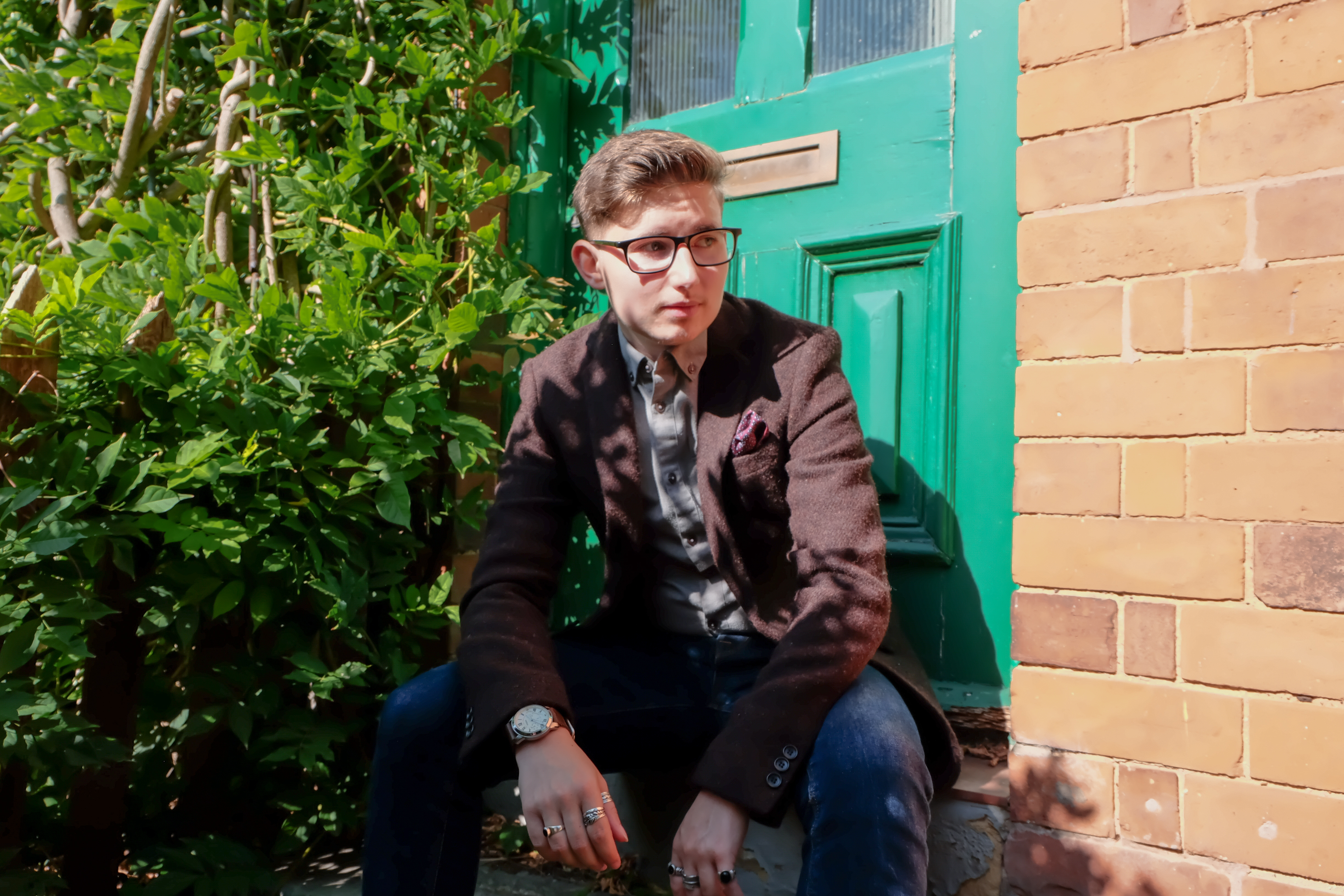
- Hulme in 2019
- Born: 28 January 1997 (age 29); Leicester, United Kingdom
- Education: BA(Hons) in English and journalism from the University of the West of England
- Occupations: Poet, performer, teacher
- Writing career
- Period: 2014–present
- Genre: Poetry
- Website: jayhulme.com

Jay Anthony Hulme (born 28 January 1997) is an English transgender performance poet and author from Leicester.

== Career ==
In 2015 Hulme won SLAMbassadors UK, the UK's biggest youth poetry slam, run by Joelle Taylor on behalf of the Poetry Society. That year of the slam was judged by Anthony Anaxagorou and held in the Clore Ballroom at The Southbank Centre.

In 2017 he competed in the BBC Edinburgh Fringe Slam and later in the year was featured on the BBC Asian Network's Spoken Word Showcase.

Hulme's poetry features in a number of solo poetry collections, as well as anthologies published by small presses, such as Otter-Barry Books, and larger publishers, such as Bloomsbury and Ladybird Books.

In 2021, Hulme was appointed poet in residence at St Giles in the Fields.

He also serves as the Churchwarden for St Nicholas Church, Leicester, UK.

== Personal life ==
Born on 28 January 1997 in Leicester, Jay Hulme was educated at Stonehill High School and Longslade Community College in Birstall, Leicestershire.

In 2018 he graduated from the University of the West of England with a BA(Hons) in English and Journalism.

He did not believe in God before having an experience with the divine. He converted to Anglicanism in 2019.

Between 2021 and 2023, Hulme was stalked by and harassed by a Licensed Lay Minister in the Church of England who spread false accusations against him after he rejected her advances. Both the Diocese of Leicester and the police initially sided with the stalker until other victims came to light.

== Bibliography ==
- The Prospect of Wings (2015)
- A Heartful of Fist (2016, Out-Spoken Press)
- City Boys Should Not Feed Horses (2016)
- Rising Stars (2017, Otter-Barry Books)
- Clouds Cannot Cover Us (2019, Troika Books)
- The Book of Queer Prophets: 21 Writers on Sexuality and Religion (2020, Harper Collins)
- Here Be Monsters (2021, Pop Up)
- The Backwater Sermons (2021, Canterbury Press)
- My Own Way (2021, Quarto)
- The Vanishing Song (2023, Canterbury Press)

== Award nominations ==
- Carnegie Medal (2021)
