= Frank Rye =

British politician

Frank Gibbs Rye (12 August 1874 – 18 October 1948) was a British solicitor and Conservative politician.

The third son of Walter Rye, the athlete and antiquary, and Georgina Eliza Rye of Norwich, he was educated at Fauconberg Grammar School, Beccles and St Paul's School, London. He was admitted as a solicitor in 1901, and joined his father's legal firm. The company was largely involved in conveyancing, Rye eventually became the senior partner, and he built up a lucrative practice transferring freehold and leasehold property in the Soho area of central London.

He entered local politics as an alderman on Westminster City Council, and was mayor of the city in 1922–1923. He was appointed by the city council to the Metropolitan Water Board and the Thames Conservancy. At the 1923 general election he was the Conservative Party candidate for the constituency of Loughborough in Leicestershire, but failed to be elected. When another election was held in 1924 he was elected to the House of Commons as Loughborough's Member of Parliament, with the sitting Liberal Party MP, Edward Spears being beaten into third place behind George Winterton of the Labour Party. Rye served only one term in parliament, and was defeated in 1929 when Winterton, his Labour opponent of five years before, won the seat. In 1931 he was chosen by the Conservatives to contest Walsall. In the event the party did not contest the seat, instead supporting the Liberal candidate as the representative of the National Government.

In 1937 he was elected to the London County Council as a Municipal Reform Party councillor representing Westminster, Abbey. He remained a member of the county council until his death, and served as deputy chairman in 1946–1947. He was created an OBE in 1937 and CBE in 1945. A director of a number of companies in the City of London, he was Master of the Worshipful Company of Needlemakers in 1945–1946.

He was twice married. In 1901 he married Ethel Mary Beloe of King's Lynn. The couple had three sons and one daughter. Following her death in 1938 he married Nora, widow of Guy Gayford, of Raynham, Norfolk in 1947.

He died suddenly at his home, Basing House, Thames Ditton in Surrey on 18 October 1948.

Parliament of the United Kingdom
Preceded by Edward Spears	Member of Parliament for Loughborough; 1924–1929	Succeeded by Ernest Winterton
