= Jeevun Sandher =

British Labour politician (born 1990)

Jeevun Sandher MP
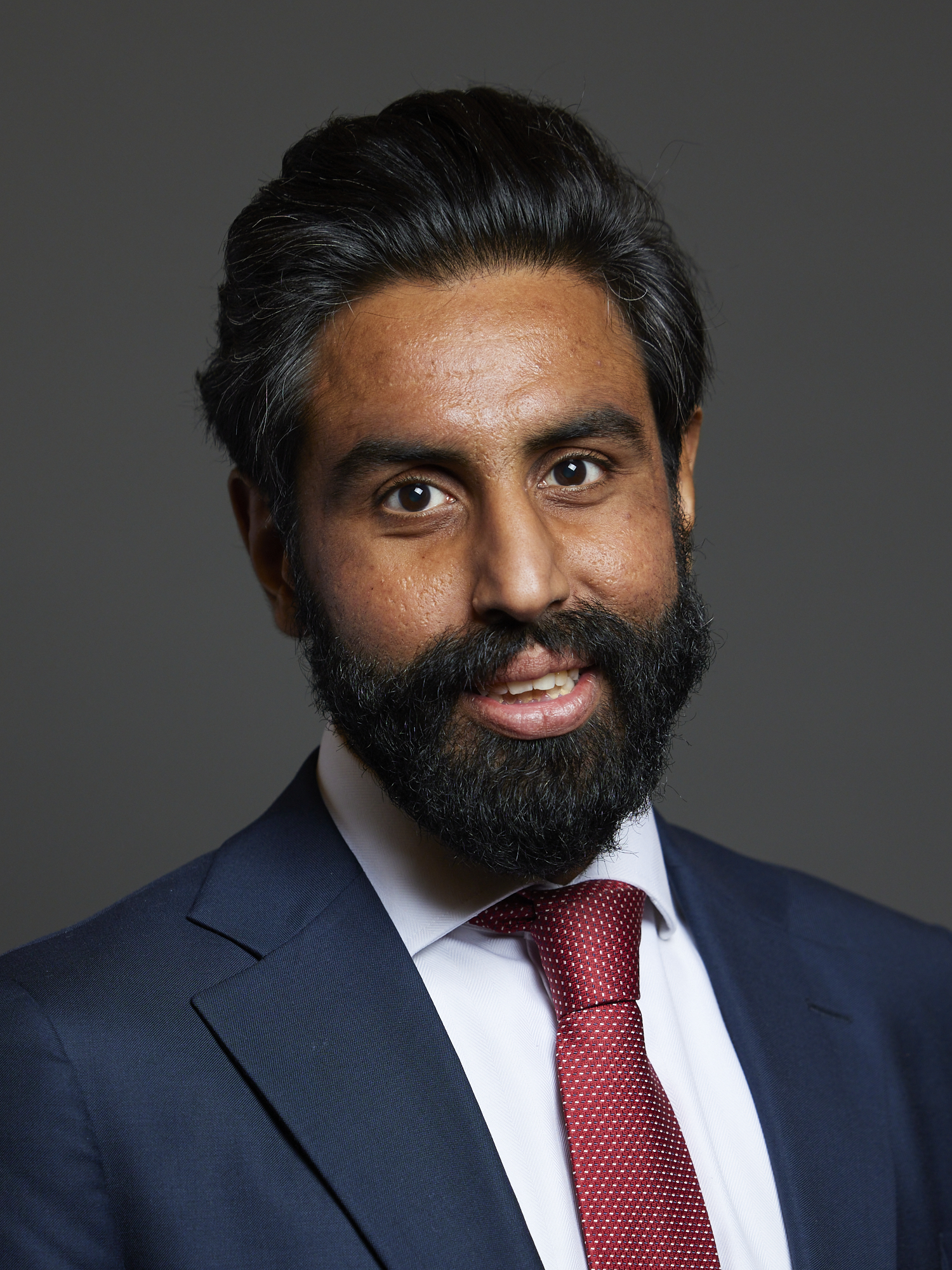
- Official portrait, 2024

Member of Parliament for Loughborough
- Incumbent
- Assumed office 4 July 2024
- Preceded by: Jane Hunt
- Majority: 4,960 (11.7%)

Personal details
- Born: Jeevun Gurpreet Singh Sandher; September 1990 (age 36) Luton, Bedfordshire, England
- Party: Labour
- Spouse: Louise Jones (m. 2025)
- Education: University of Nottingham (BA, MSc); King's College London (PhD)
- Profession: Politician; economist
- Website: jeevunsandher.mp

Jeevun Gurpreet Singh Sandher (born September 1990) is a British Labour Party politician who has served as the Member of Parliament for Loughborough since 2024, gaining the seat from Jane Hunt.

== Early life ==
Sandher was born in Luton, Bedfordshire into a British Punjabi Sikh family with origins from Jalandhar, Punjab.

== Career ==
Sandher graduated with a PhD in Political Economy from King’s College London in 2022. Prior to that he was awarded an MSc in Economic Development and Policy Analysis and a BA in Economics and Philosophy from the University of Nottingham. He previously led the economics team at the New Economics Foundation. Before undertaking his doctorate, Sandher worked in Somaliland as an economist in the Ministry of Finance. He has also had roles in HM Treasury, and the Department for Work and Pensions, where he advised on budgeting, macroeconomic policy, inequality, poverty and social security. While studying for his PhD, he co-hosted the Politics JaM podcast. He was also an active member of the Young Fabians.

== Political career ==
Sandher was selected as the prospective parliamentary candidate for Loughborough in December 2022. He won the seat at the 2024 general election with an 11.8% swing from the Conservatives. His majority of 4,960 votes represented an 11.7% margin of victory and a 2.1% increase in vote share for Labour.

Upon entering Parliament, Sandher made his maiden speech on 4 September 2024.

Sandher was approved as a member of the Treasury Select Committee in a Commons motion on 21 October 2024. Prior to this, he was appointed chair of the All-party parliamentary groups (APPGs) concerning India and Hydrogen.

Politically, Sandher has been described as sitting on the soft left of the Labour Party.

Sandher was a co-sponsor of Kim Leadbeater's unsuccessful Terminally Ill Adults (End of Life) Bill, which proposed to legalise assisted suicide.

He is a member of the Fabian Society's executive committee.

In November 2025, Sandher was recorded as a Parliamentary Private Secretary to the Department of Business and Trade.

== Personal life ==
Sandher and fellow newly elected Labour MP Louise Jones announced their engagement, shortly after his proposal on 1 December 2024. He met the North East Derbyshire MP in Loughborough in 2023 before they were both elected to Parliament in 2024. They were married in August 2025.

Parliament of the United Kingdom
Preceded by Jane Hunt	Member of Parliament for Loughborough; 2024–present	Incumbent
