= Edward Johnson-Ferguson =

Sir Jabez Edward Johnson-Ferguson, 1st Baronet (27 November 1849 – 10 December 1929) was an English businessman and Liberal politician. He became a baronet on 18 July 1906.

Johnson-Ferguson was born Jabez Edward Johnson at Salford, Lancashire. He was educated at St John's College, Cambridge. He was a merchant of Lancashire living at Kenyon Hall, Culcheth near Warrington (Currently owned and used as Leigh Golf Club) and chairman of his company, which had several names including Messrs. Jabez Johnson & Co and Jabez Johnson, Hodgkinson and Pearson, Ltd. He was also a director of Williams, Deacon & Manchester and Salford Bank Ltd. In 1881 he assumed by Royal licence the additional surname of Ferguson.

Johnson-Ferguson was elected as Member of Parliament for Loughborough in 1885. He was a radical Liberal. He lost the seat in 1886, but regained it in 1892, holding it until 1900. At the general election of 1900, he contested the Burton Division of Staffordshire, but was unsuccessful. In 1891 he became a director of Bolckow Vaughan Co. Ltd, a mining company, and became its chairman and managing director in 1906 until his death. He was also a director of the Balcares Iron Ore Mines Ltd, and the Luchana Mining Company which had a Spanish focus.

Parliament of the United Kingdom
New constituency	Member of Parliament for Loughborough; 1885–1886	Succeeded by Edwin de Lisle
Preceded by Edwin de Lisle	Member of Parliament for Loughborough; 1892–1900	Succeeded by Sir Maurice Levy
Baronetage of the United Kingdom
New creation	Baronet (of Springkell, Kenyon and Wiston); 1906–1929	Succeeded by Edward Johnson-Ferguson
