= Greenwell baronets =

Baronetcy in the Baronetage of the United Kingdom

Escutcheon of the Greenwell baronets

The Greenwell Baronetcy, of Marden Park in Godstone in the County of Surrey and Greenwell in Wolsingham in the County of Durham, is a title in the Baronetage of the United Kingdom. It was created on 19 July 1906 as part of the King's Birthday Honours for the stockbroker Walpole Greenwell.

The Greenwell family has owned the Gedgrave estate in Suffolk since the 1930s, and has land in Inverness-shire. The baronetical Greenwells were a junior line of a family of Durham gentry, and were for generations resident at Corbridge, Northumberland; in 1890, Sir Walpole Lloyd Greenwell, 1st Baronet purchased the Greenwell property granted to the family before 1183 from a daughter of the senior line of the Greenwell family.

== Greenwell baronets, of Marden Park and Greenwell (1906) ==
- Sir Walpole Lloyd Greenwell, 1st Baronet (9 June 1847 – 25 October 1919)
- Sir Bernard Eyre Greenwell, 2nd Baronet (29 May 1874 – 28 November 1939)
- Sir Peter McClintock Greenwell, 3rd Baronet (1914–1978)
- Sir Edward Bernard Greenwell, 4th Baronet (born 10 June 1948)

The heir apparent is the present holder's son Alexander Bernard Peter Greenwell (born 1987).

== Sir Walpole Lloyd Greenwell, Bt. ==
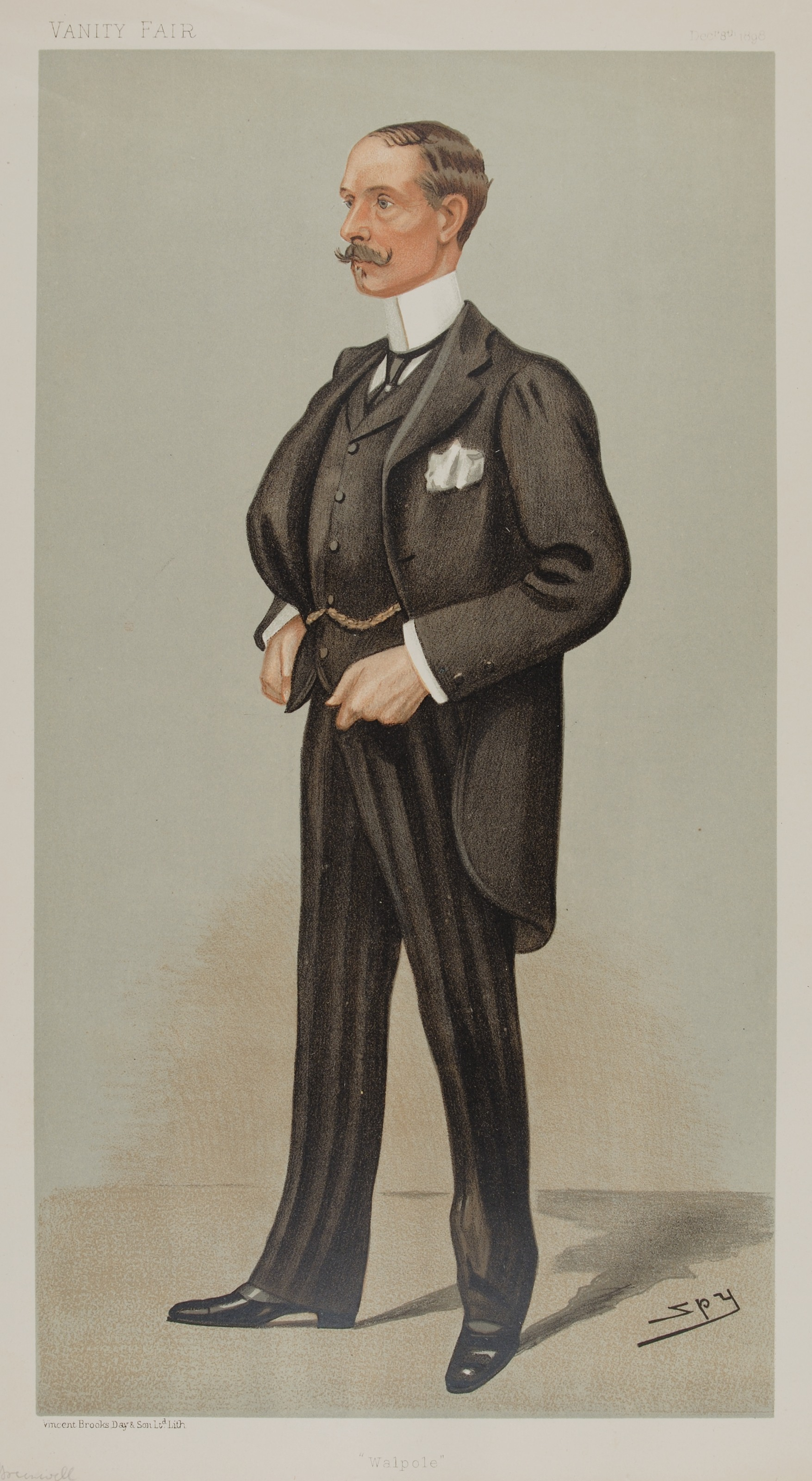
Walpole Lloyd Greenwell caricatured by Spy in Vanity Fair, 1898

The first Baronet had also been High Sheriff of Surrey in 1903 (having been first nominated in 1900) and His Majesty's Lieutenant of the City of London. Walpole Greenwell, who fought in the First Boer War, became a member of the London Stock Exchange at age 21 and founded W. Greenwell & Co., which would become one of the wealthiest and most prominent stockbroking firms in the City of London. He was a keen agriculturist, a prominent breeder of pedigree stock, particularly Shorthorn cattle and Shire horses, for which he was awarded numerous championships, and was President of the Royal Shire Horse Society. His Shire horse stud was considered the finest in the country. He was a trustee of the Whiteley Homes Trust, the Holloway Sanatorium, and a member of the governing body of Royal Holloway College.

== Sir Bernard Eyre Greenwell, Bt. ==
Walpole Greenwell was succeeded by his son Major Bernard Greenwell MBE, who also succeeded him as senior partner in the family stockbroking firm. Bernard Greenwell had been educated at Harrow and Trinity College, Cambridge, before serving in the Second Boer War where he earned the Queen's South Africa Medal with four clasps. In 1932 he took over as chairman of the County of London Electric Supply Company and expanded it to become the largest electric supply company in the country. Electricity distribution had been largely confined to urban areas, but under Greenwell's chairmanship supplies were extended in Essex, Kent and Dorset, and he was keen to see electrical supplies provided for agricultural concerns. Like his father, he also bred stock, and in 1938 he purchased the entire herd of Shorthorn cattle reared by William Duthie at Collynie in Aberdeenshire, considered one of the best in the country. He farmed two large country estates, Marden Park and Butley Abbey Farm near Woodbridge, Suffolk. He married in 1902 Anna Elizabeth McClintock, daughter of Admiral Sir Francis Leopold McClintock KCB.

== Sir Peter McLintock Greenwell, Bt. ==
Peter Greenwell was High Sheriff of Suffolk for 1966–67.

== Sir Edward Bernard Greenwell, Bt., DL ==
Edward Greenwell is a deputy lieutenant of Suffolk and was high sheriff of Suffolk for 2013–14.

Baronetage of the United Kingdom
Preceded by Johnson-Ferguson baronets	Greenwell baronets of Marden Park and Greenwell; 19 July 1906	Succeeded by Huntington baronets
