= Stonehill High School =

The Stonehill High School

Location
- Stonehill Avenue; Birstall, Leicestershire, LE4 4JH; England; 52°41′09″N 1°07′14″W

Information
- Type: Academy
- Established: 1959
- Closed: 2015
- Local authority: Leicestershire
- Department for Education URN: 140787 Tables
- Ofsted: Reports
- Gender: Coeducational
- Age: 11 to 14
- Enrolment: 635 Max capacity 771
- Colour: Black Yellow White Red Blue Green
- Website: http://www.stonehill.leics.sch.uk/

The Stonehill High School was an 11-14 middle school in Birstall Leicestershire which was adjacent to the former Longslade Community College which took most of its pupils. The school was a Technology Specialist school and school converted to academy status in April 2014.

== Merger ==
In 2015 the school merged with Longslade Community College to form The Cedars Academy.

== Notable former pupils ==
- Avril Lennox, gymnast
