= Nicky Morgan =

British politician (born 1972)

The Right Honourable The Baroness Morgan of Cotes PC
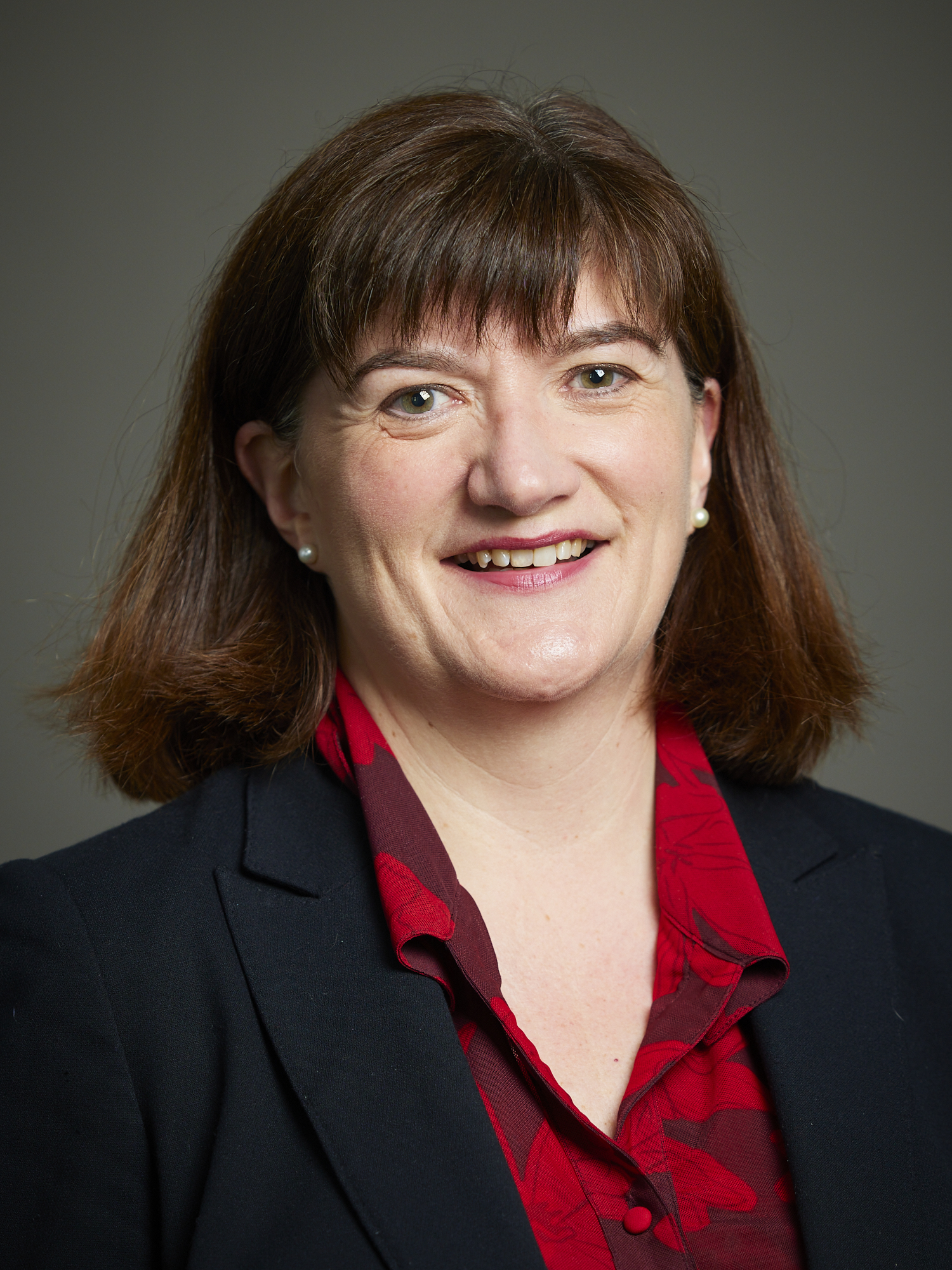
- Official portrait, 2023

Secretary of State for Digital, Culture, Media and Sport
- In office 24 July 2019 – 13 February 2020
- Prime Minister: Boris Johnson
- Preceded by: Jeremy Wright
- Succeeded by: Oliver Dowden

Secretary of State for Education
- In office 15 July 2014 – 14 July 2016
- Prime Minister: David Cameron
- Preceded by: Michael Gove
- Succeeded by: Justine Greening

Minister for Women and Equalities (Note: Minister for Women until 15 July 2014, when she gained the Equalities brief from Sajid Javid)
- In office 9 April 2014 – 14 July 2016
- Prime Minister: David Cameron
- Preceded by: Maria Miller
- Succeeded by: Justine Greening
Junior ministerial offices
Financial Secretary to the Treasury
In office 9 April 2014 – 15 July 2014
| Prime Minister | David Cameron |
| Preceded by | Sajid Javid |
| Succeeded by | David Gauke |
Economic Secretary to the Treasury
In office 7 October 2013 – 9 April 2014
| Prime Minister | David Cameron |
| Preceded by | Sajid Javid |
| Succeeded by | Andrea Leadsom |
Further offices held
Chair of the Treasury Select Committee
In office 12 July 2017 – 24 July 2019
| Preceded by | Andrew Tyrie |
| Succeeded by | John Mann (acting) |
Member of the House of Lords
Lord Temporal
Life peerage 6 January 2020
Member of Parliament for Loughborough
In office 6 May 2010 – 6 November 2019
| Preceded by | Andy Reed |
| Succeeded by | Jane Hunt |

Personal details
- Born: Nicola Ann Griffith; 10 October 1972 (age 53) Kingston upon Thames, London, England
- Party: Non-affiliated (since 2024)
- Other political affiliations: Conservative (until 2024)
- Spouse: Jonathan Morgan
- Children: 1
- Education: St Hugh's College, Oxford
- Website: Official website

Nicola Ann Morgan, Baroness Morgan of Cotes (née Griffith; born 10 October 1972) is a British politician who served as Secretary of State for Education and Minister for Women and Equalities from 2014 to 2016 and Secretary of State for Digital, Culture, Media and Sport from 2019 to 2020. She was the first woman to chair the Treasury Select Committee. A member of the Conservative Party, she was Member of Parliament (MP) for Loughborough from 2010 to 2019. She is the current Chair of the Advertising Standards Authority, having succeeded Lord Currie of Marylebone in November 2024.

Born in Kingston upon Thames, Morgan was raised in Surbiton. After graduating from St Hugh's College, Oxford, she worked as a solicitor and corporate lawyer. She was elected to the marginal seat of Loughborough at the 2010 general election. She served as Economic Secretary to the Treasury from October 2013 to April 2014 and as Financial Secretary to the Treasury from April to July 2014. Morgan first served in the Cabinet as Education Secretary and Minister for Women and Equalities from 2014 until new Prime Minister Theresa May removed her from these positions in 2016. In July 2017, she was elected chair of the Treasury Select Committee following the 2017 general election.

Morgan accepted the appointment by Boris Johnson of Culture Secretary in July 2019. In October 2019, Morgan announced she would stand down as an MP at the 2019 general election but retained her cabinet post as part of the second Johnson ministry after being elevated to the House of Lords as a life peer. She stood down from her ministerial position in Johnson's 2020 cabinet reshuffle.

== Early life and career ==
Morgan was born in Kingston upon Thames in south-west London on 10 October 1972. She grew up in Surbiton and was privately educated at Surbiton High School. Morgan joined the Conservative Party as a teenager in 1989. She read jurisprudence at St Hugh's College, Oxford. She twice stood unsuccessfully for president of the Oxford University Conservative Association, on the second occasion being defeated by Daniel Hannan, later a Conservative Member of the European Parliament. She was also elected as Treasurer of the Oxford Union Society.

Morgan qualified as a solicitor in 1994 and worked as a corporate lawyer at Travers Smith specialising in mergers and acquisitions, before taking on an in-house counsel role advising on corporate law matters. She was the chair of Wessex Young Conservatives from 1995 to 1997 and vice-chair of Battersea Conservatives from 1997 to 1999.

Morgan unsuccessfully contested the Islington South and Finsbury constituency in the 2001 general election, standing against Labour Cabinet Minister Chris Smith. She was selected as the Conservative Party candidate for the Loughborough parliamentary seat in 2004 but was defeated by the Labour incumbent in the 2005 general election, although she achieved a 5% Labour to Conservative swing compared to a national average of 3.1%. This made Loughborough the most marginal seat in the East Midlands. Morgan was reselected for the Loughborough seat in 2006.

== Parliamentary career ==
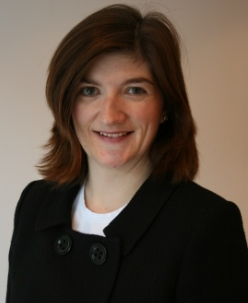
Morgan in 2010

In the 2010 general election, Morgan was elected as the MP for Loughborough on a swing of 5.5% with a majority of 3,744 votes. She made her maiden speech in a debate on Economic Affairs and Work and Pensions on 8 June 2010. In June 2010, she was selected as a Conservative member of the Business, Innovation and Skills Committee but was replaced following promotion in September to Parliamentary Private Secretary to the Universities and Science Minister, David Willetts. She was appointed as an assistant whip in September 2012 and as Economic Secretary to the Treasury on 7 October 2013.

In July 2010, Morgan asked the Prime Minister to join her in congratulating Loughborough University Student Union Rag Committee on raising more money on behalf of the Royal British Legion than any other rag in the country. Both agreed it was an example of the Big Society in action.

On 7 November 2010, Morgan appeared on the Politics Show with Lucy Hopkins, Loughborough Students' Union President, to continue an earlier on-campus debate on the tripling of student tuition fees. Morgan agreed costs could be daunting but said student numbers were unsustainable, it was fair to ask people to invest in their own education and people should ask more questions about how courses would improve prospects. Hopkins accepted that the Government had tried to find fair options but said students were taking on "excessive debts" which they would still be paying off when their own children went to university, they had no guarantee of a better job and those from poor homes would either have to choose an affordable university or not attend. In response, Morgan said that university was not a rite of passage, and that there were other ways of continuing education and she herself had taken eight years to pay off her debts.

In 2022 Morgan advocated that women members of the House of Lords should be able to pass on their titles to their spouses; existing rules extend this right to male peers only.

=== Minister for Women and Equalities ===
In 2013, Morgan voted against the introduction of same-sex marriage in England and Wales, citing, among other reasons, her Christian belief that marriage could only be between a man and a woman.

Following the resignation of Maria Miller from the Cabinet, she became Minister for Women (attending Cabinet) on 9 April 2014 and was appointed a Privy Councillor. However, the equalities brief went to Sajid Javid, the culture secretary.

The separation of the equalities portfolio was seen by some as a response to Morgan's vote against the government's proposal to introduce legislation allowing same-sex marriages. This led to accusations that Morgan was merely "minister for straight women". On her promotion, she retained her post as Minister for Women and also added the equalities brief to it, thus also becoming Minister for Women and Equalities. However, Downing Street announced that responsibility for implementing the rest of the changes to same-sex marriage would be driven by Nick Boles, a new education minister who is himself gay and is in a civil partnership.

In October 2014, she clarified her views saying she had previously voted against gay marriage as she believed her constituents were opposed to it. However she would now support it and she wished "supporters of same-sex marriage had been more vocal about their position before the vote in July last year." She expressed support for Ireland's "yes" vote on same-sex marriage in May 2015.

=== Secretary of State for Education ===
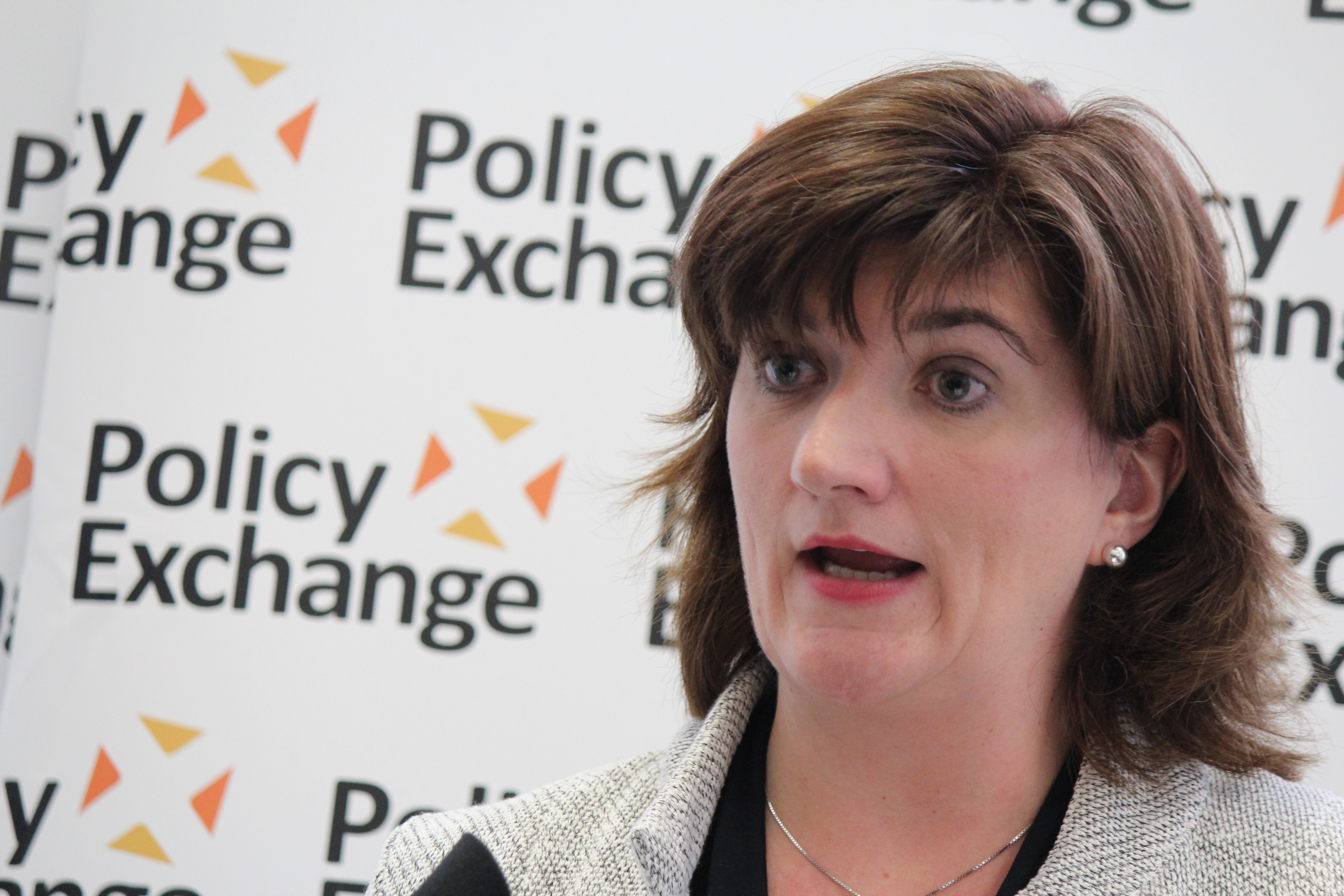
Morgan as Secretary of State for Education in 2015

Morgan was appointed Secretary of State for Education in Prime Minister David Cameron's reshuffle in July 2014, replacing Michael Gove.

In September 2014, Morgan was questioned by Parliament's Education Select Committee following a report by London University's Institute of Education on conflicts of interest between academies and their financial backers. The report failed to find evidence that academies were undertaking competitive tendering or that they were being properly monitored by the Education Funding Agency (EFA). It also said that previous reports had also questioned the capability of the EFA to fund and finance academies. Graham Stuart, chairman of the committee, acknowledged that there were loopholes but said the public needed to be sure that sponsors acted exclusively in the interests of their school.

Following concerns from business leaders that children were leaving school without good teamwork skills, Morgan stated that character development is as important as academic achievement. In December 2014, she announced £3.5 million of funding to promote the building of "grit" and "resilience". Some schemes were likely to involve ex-servicemen teaching pupils – particularly those with behaviour problems – the importance of discipline.The Daily Telegraph reported potential concerns about maths, English and science being effectively downgraded.

Morgan was removed from her position of Education Secretary on 14 July 2016 under the new Prime Minister Theresa May.

=== Criticism by the UK Statistics Authority ===
In December 2014, Morgan was advised by Sir Andrew Dilnot, chair of the UK Statistics Authority, that she should "reconsider her comments" and possibly "take advice" about misleading information given to parliament. Morgan had claimed that one third of children under the previous Labour government had left primary school unable to read or write. In fact 91% of 11-year-old pupils tested in May 2010 had reached at least level 3 of Key Stage 2 – defined as being able to "read a range of texts fluently and accurately" – whereas 83% achieved level 4, the expected level. The BBC noting that 64% achieved expected results in all subjects tested suggests Morgan had both misunderstood official literacy level definitions and confused literacy results with expected overall attainment levels.

=== Relationship with Michael Gove ===
In an interview with The Observer in December 2014, Morgan – who has been engaged in a long running "battle with Michael Gove" over policy – expounded her views on her relationship with her predecessor. Her friends have denied that she is subservient to Gove, whereas Morgan herself has rejected Gove's attitude to the educational establishment, which he had described as "a left wing blob". Morgan told The Observer that although Gove's combative style alienated teachers, she fully supports his key policies: the introduction of free schools and the expansion of academies.

Writing in The Times the following day, Sir Anthony Seldon, headmaster of Wellington College and a key Gove ally, claimed that Morgan knew little about schools and had accepted the education portfolio despite an initial lack of interest. She needed more radical policies to get schools to develop pupils who were "rounded, resilient citizens" but her "probable departure at the election" meant she was unlikely to make any sort of mark.

In 2016 and 2019, Morgan supported Gove for leadership of the Conservative Party.

=== Row over 2014 school league tables ===
The 2014 school league tables published in January 2015 excluded some results from fee-paying schools using International GCSEs (IGCSEs) which Morgan regards as not rigorous or challenging enough, a move which placed many of them, including Eton, near the bottom of the tables. Writing to The Daily Telegraph, Simon Lebus, the chief executive of Cambridge assessment, said Morgan had been poorly advised and that admission tutors agreed that the exams were the best preparation for university. He said the Department of Education should encourage competition – a race to the top between the two exam types – rather than "trying to rig the race". Morgan appealed to the fee-paying schools to return to conventional GCSEs.

=== 2015 general election ===
In January 2014, speaking at a meeting of the Bright Blue Conservative think tank, Morgan said Conservatives would have to send out an optimistic message and not just "the language of hate" if they were to win the next general election. Her comments were thought to show concern at right-wing backbenchers' criticisms of Cameron on immigration, welfare, and the EU, although a party source insisted that she was talking about very few people.

Professor Stephen Fisher of Oxford University, writing for the Higher Education Policy Institute think tank, observed in December 2014 that Loughborough was one of 10 or 11 constituencies where the student vote could affect the outcome. Loughborough was one of several Conservative marginals with a student population of more than 13% and he noted Morgan as being at risk of losing her seat in 2015.

In May 2015, The Guardian highlighted a donation of £3,220 from Paul Mercer, a Conservative activist, former councillor and constituent who runs a local radio campaign on Morgan's behalf. According to The Guardian, Mercer is known to have worked for a "secretive corporate security firm" with a history of infiltrating and spying on political campaigners and had passed confidential legal advice to their opponents.

In the event, Morgan increased her majority achieving a 5.25% swing compared to a −0.3% swing nationally.

=== Religious education in schools ===
In December 2015, Morgan declared that a High Court ruling that religious teaching should be pluralistic, and that therefore it was unlawful to exclude teaching about atheism and humanism, should be ignored as UK religious traditions are mainly Christian. The Independent newspaper noted that both she and her department had also ignored the Commission on Religion and Belief in British Public Life report that Britain is "no longer predominantly Christian." The British Humanist Association, which supported the legal battle against Morgan, called Morgan's decision to simply ignore the judgment against her "an affront to democracy".

Morgan is a member of the Conservative Christian Fellowship.

=== Specialist school for deaf children ===
In December 2015, British Deaf Association chairman Terry Riley expressed regret at the closing of the Royal School for Deaf Children in Margate which closed despite an appeal to Morgan. However, an inspection the previous month by the Care Quality Commission had uncovered what the inspectors called "shocking examples of institutionalised failings and abuse" at the nearby Westgate College for Deaf People for students aged 16 and over, which was run by the same educational trust. The trust running the schools subsequently went into administration.

=== Conversion of all schools to academies ===
In March 2016, Morgan told a NASUWT conference that the government had made significant improvements to the education system and would not back down. Every school would become an academy by 2022 and she invited the unions to help shape the reforms. NASUWT General secretary, Chris Keates asked her to listen to the concerns raised. Her proposal was also criticised by her own backbenchers as likely to remove parental and local authority involvement, force small rural schools to close, reduce accountability and cost more than the £1.6 billion estimated in the budget. Chairman of the 1922 Committee Graham Brady said he would write to Morgan. The plan was dropped days later, except for schools in "underperforming" local authorities.

=== 2016 EU referendum and May government ===
Morgan supported the 'Remain' campaign in the 2016 referendum. Following the vote to leave and Cameron's resignation, she announced she was considering running for the Conservative party leadership. She said the vote had split the country and parliament could not spend the next few years on the single issue of Europe. She wanted a grown up debate on immigration, which included the positive case and not simply problems relating to jobs and housing and criticised Nigel Farage's campaign for "emboldening" racists and bigots. In spite of her stance for Remain in the referendum, Morgan endorsed Leave campaigner Michael Gove as the party leadership candidate on 30 June 2016.

Following Theresa May's policy statement advocating new grammar schools, Morgan joined Michael Wilshaw in saying the changes were a retrograde step and a distraction from six years of effort under David Cameron to improve the existing state system via academies and free school reforms.

In early December 2016, Theresa May was interviewed and photographed by the Sunday Times. Among the photos, May posed in a pair of brown leather trousers which cost £995. The photos and May's fashion choices were discussed widely in Conservative circles, with the cost of the trousers deemed excessive and giving May an air of being out of touch with the electorate. Morgan was among May's critics who expressed concerns about the leather trousers. Morgan said that she would feel concerned about how she would justify such expense to constituents in Loughborough Market. Morgan was disinvited from a meeting about Brexit at Number 10. The falling-out became known on social media as #Trousergate. Following the falling-out, Morgan withdrew from a scheduled appearance on Have I Got News for You, explaining that she wished to "keep a low profile". She was replaced by a handbag, referring to an equally expensive handbag she owned.

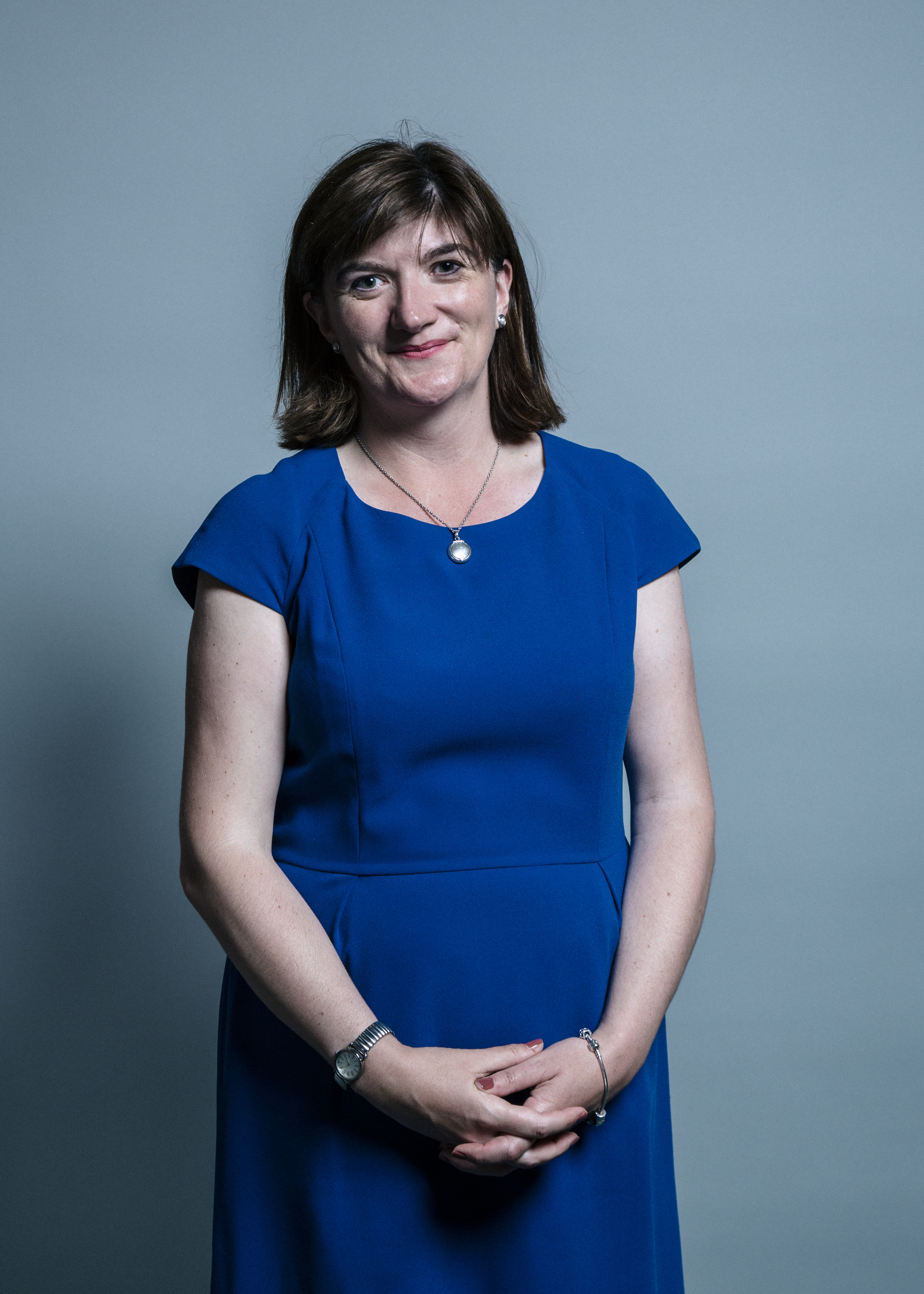
Official portrait, 2017

Following the 2017 general election, Morgan defeated pro-Brexit MP Jacob Rees-Mogg, her nearest rival, to be elected chair of the Treasury Select Committee.

In December 2017, Morgan voted along with fellow Conservative Dominic Grieve and nine other Conservative MPs against the government, and in favour of guaranteeing Parliament a "meaningful vote" on any deal Theresa May agrees with Brussels over Brexit. In May 2018, Morgan joined Nick Clegg and David Miliband calling for a soft Brexit.

Morgan opposed delays until October 2019 in stake reduction for fixed odds betting terminals; she cited Tracey Crouch that two people commit suicide daily through gambling addiction. Morgan said, "It is the case that the government has prioritised the preservation of jobs in the gambling industry over the addiction of those who suffer from these machines." Morgan also said, "The trouble with that very rational analysis […] is that it doesn’t really help the expected 300 people who may end up taking their lives, suffering mental health problems from gambling addiction."

In the 2019 Conservative Party leadership election, she supported Michael Gove. Morgan during the campaign supported former Conservative Prime Minister John Major's plan for legal action if parliament were suspended to deliver No-deal Brexit. She commented that such a suspension 'would lead to a constitutional crisis' and that it was 'clearly a mad suggestion'.

=== Secretary of State for Digital, Culture, Media and Sport ===
Morgan joined Boris Johnson's government as Secretary of State for Digital, Culture, Media and Sport in July 2019. She stood down from the House of Commons at the December general election but remained in cabinet. On 6 January 2020, she was created Baroness Morgan of Cotes, of Cotes in the County of Leicestershire, allowing her to represent the government from the House of Lords.

== Post-government activities ==
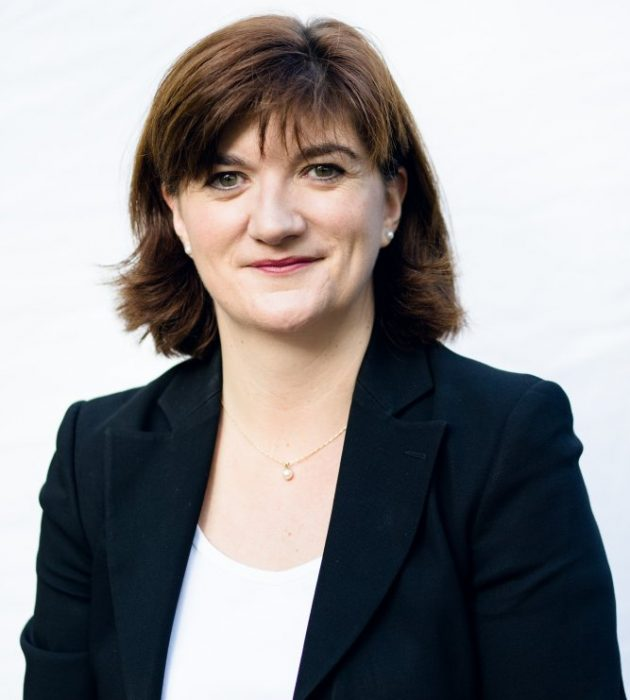
Morgan in 2019

In January 2020, she announced her intention to "step back from ministerial life" and did so when Boris Johnson reshuffled his cabinet in February.

Morgan was understood to be under Boris Johnson's considerations for the position of Chairman of the BBC in August 2020.

In May 2021, alongside celebrities and other public figures, Morgan was a signatory to an open letter from Stylist magazine which called on the government to address what it described as an "epidemic of male violence" by funding an "ongoing, high-profile, expert-informed awareness campaign on men’s violence against women and girls".

In July 2022, it was announced that Morgan would head the UK Commission on Covid Commemoration.

She is a Non-Executive Director at Santander UK, the Financial Services Compensation Scheme, the Association of British Insurers, the Careers & Enterprise Company and is a Trustee of the Science Museum Group and a Council Lay Member of Loughborough University.

== Personal life ==
Morgan lives in rural Leicestershire and London. She is married to Jonathan Morgan, an architect and former leader of Charnwood Borough Council. Her husband is the former Conservative Borough Councillor for Loughborough Outwoods Ward and current County Councillor for Loughborough South West. They have a son, Alex, who was born in 2008. Her hobbies include recreational running.

Morgan is a Christian and has been a churchwarden of All Saints Church, Loughborough, since 2023.

Parliament of the United Kingdom
| Preceded by Andy Reed | Member of Parliament for Loughborough; 2010–2019 | Succeeded by Jane Hunt |
Political offices
| Preceded by Sajid Javid | Economic Secretary to the Treasury; 2013–2014 | Succeeded by Andrea Leadsom |
| Preceded by Sajid Javid | Financial Secretary to the Treasury; 2014 | Succeeded by David Gauke |
| Vacant Office suspended Title last held by Lynne Featherstone | Minister for Women; 2014 | Vacant Office suspended Title next held by Anne Milton |
| Preceded by Maria Miller | Minister for Women and Equalities; 2014–2016 | Succeeded by Justine Greening |
| Preceded by Michael Gove | Secretary of State for Education; 2014–2016 | Succeeded by Justine Greening |
| Preceded by Jeremy Wright | Secretary of State for Digital, Culture, Media and Sport; 2019–2020 | Succeeded by Oliver Dowden |
