= Loughborough (constituency) =

Parliamentary constituency in the United Kingdom, 1885 onwards

Coordinates: 52.77°N 1.20°W

- County constituency for the House of Commons
- Interactive map of boundaries since 2024
- Local government in East Midlands: Leicestershire
- Electorate: 73,902 (March 2020)
- Major settlements: Loughborough, Shepshed, Barrow-upon-Soar

Current constituency
- Created: 1885
- Member of Parliament: Jeevun Sandher (Labour)
- Seats: One
- Created from: North Leicestershire
- During its existence contributed to new seat(s) of: Leicester West (1918); North West Leicestershire (1983); Charnwood (1997)

Loughborough is a constituency (Note: A county constituency (for the purposes of election expenses and type of returning officer)) in Leicestershire represented in the House of Commons of the UK Parliament since 2024 by Jeevun Sandher of the Labour Party. (Note: As with all constituencies, the constituency elects one Member of Parliament (MP) by the first past the post system of election at least every five years.) The constituency is considered a bellwether, as it has reflected the national result at every general election since February 1974.

== Constituency profile ==
Loughborough is a constituency in Leicestershire. It is centred on the town of Loughborough, which has a population of around 66,000. Other settlements include the small market town of Shepshed and the villages of Quorn and Barrow upon Soar. Loughborough is a market town known for its university, which has around 19,000 students. The university is notable for its focus on sports, making the town home to many athletes. The town of Loughborough has average levels of wealth and the surrounding villages and rural areas are generally affluent. House prices are higher than the rest of the East Midlands but below the national average.

In general, residents of the constituency are young and well-educated. Rates of homeownership and household income are average. A high proportion of residents work in professional occupations, with many in the education and manufacturing sectors. The child poverty rate is average and a low percentage of residents claim unemployment benefits. White people made up 83% of the population at the 2021 census. Asians were 11% of residents, with Indians being the largest Asian group. Most of Loughborough is represented by Labour Party councillors at the local council level. Some Conservatives were elected in Shepshed and the villages; at the county council, which held elections in 2025, these areas elected Reform UK representatives. An estimated 52% of voters in the constituency supported remaining in the European Union in the 2016 referendum, marginally higher than the nationwide figure of 48%.

== Boundaries ==
=== Historic ===
1885–1918: The Sessional Division of Loughborough (except the parishes of Cossington, Seagrave, and Sileby), and parts of the Sessional Divisions of Ashby-de-la-Zouch and Leicester.

1918–1950: The Borough of Loughborough, the Urban Districts of Ashby-de-la-zouch, Ashby Woulds, and Shepshed, the Rural Districts of Castle Donington and Loughborough, and the Rural District of Ashby-de-la-Zouch except the parish of Bardon.

1950–1955: The Borough of Loughborough, the Urban Districts of Ashby-de-la-Zouch, Ashby Woulds, and Shepshed, and the Rural Districts of Ashby-de-la-Zouch and Castle Donington.

1955–1974: The Borough of Loughborough, the Urban Districts of Ashby-de-la-Zouch, Ashby Woulds, and Shepshed, the Rural District of Ashby-de-la-Zouch as constituted by the County of Leicester (Coalville Urban District) Confirmation Order 1953, and the Rural District of Castle Donington.

1974–1983: The Borough of Loughborough, the Urban Districts of Ashby-de-la-Zouch, Ashby Woulds, and Shepshed, the Rural District of Ashby-de-la-Zouch as altered by the West Midland Counties Order 1965, and the Rural District of Castle Donington as altered by the East Midland Counties Order 1965 and the County of Leicester (Coalville Urban District) Confirmation Order 1969.

1983–1997: The Borough of Charnwood wards of Ashby, Barrow upon Soar and Quorndon, Birstall Goscote, Birstall Greengate, Birstall Netherhall, Birstall Riverside, Birstall Stonehill, Garendon, Hastings, Hathern, Lemyngton, Nanpantan, Mountsorrel and Rothley, Outwoods, Sileby, Southfields, Storer, The Wolds, Thurcaston, Woodhouse and Swithland, and Woodthorpe.

1997–2010: The Borough of Charnwood wards of Ashby, Barrow upon Soar and Quorndon, Garendon, Hastings, Hathern, Lemyngton, Nanpantan, Outwoods, Shepshed East, Shepshed West, Sileby, Southfields, Storer, The Wolds, and Woodthorpe.

2010–2024: The Borough of Charnwood wards of Barrow and Sileby West, Loughborough Ashby, Loughborough Dishley and Hathern, Loughborough Garendon, Loughborough Hastings, Loughborough Lemyngton, Loughborough Nanpantan, Loughborough Outwoods, Loughborough Shelthorpe, Loughborough Southfields, Loughborough Storer, Quorn and Mountsorrel Castle, Shepshed East, Shepshed West, Sileby, and The Wolds.

=== Current ===
Further to the 2023 review of Westminster constituencies, which came into effect for the 2024 general election, the composition of the constituency was reduced to bring the electorate within the permitted range with the transfer of Sileby ward (as it existed on 1 December 2020) to the newly created constituency of Melton and Syston.

Following a local government boundary review which came into effect in May 2023, the constituency now comprises the following wards of the Borough of Charnwood from the 2024 general election:

- Barrow upon Soar; Dishley, Hathern & Thorpe Acre; Loughborough Ashby; Loughborough East; Loughborough Nanpantan, Loughborough Outwoods & Shelthorpe; Loughborough Southfields; Loughborough Storer; Loughborough Woodthorpe; Quorn & Mountsorrel Castle, Shepshed East, Shepshed West; The Wolds; and a small part of Sileby & Seagrave.

== History ==
Loughborough was originally part of a larger constituency, Leicestershire, which was split into two districts in the Reform Act 1832.

In the Redistribution of Seats Act 1885 Leicestershire was divided into five parts, Eastern (Melton), Mid [or] (Loughborough), Western (Bosworth) and Southern (Harborough), each returning one member; the last part was a borough constituency for Leicester, which returned two MPs.

In 1983 the Leicestershire coalfield, an area loyal to Labour, was removed from the constituency and replaced by much of the Soar Valley, a rural area that tended to vote Conservative. Opencast coal mining is still relevant to the west of the seat only at Measham, one of the few high-profile excavations planned by Coalfield Resources PLC (formerly UK Coal). In 1995 the Soar Valley was moved to the newly created Charnwood constituency, approximately reinstating the pre-1983 version of the seat.

The last time that Loughborough was not represented by an MP from a governing political party was prior to the February 1974 general election; since that time the constituency has been a bellwether.

== Members of Parliament ==
North Leicestershire prior to 1885

Election	Member	Party
1885	Edward Johnson-Ferguson	Liberal
1886	Edwin de Lisle	Conservative
1892	Edward Johnson-Ferguson	Liberal
1900	Maurice Levy	Liberal
1918	Oscar Guest	Coalition Liberal
Jan 1922	Oscar Guest	National Liberal
Nov 1922	Edward Spears	National Liberal
1923	Edward Spears	Liberal
1924	Frank Rye	Conservative
1929	Ernest Winterton	Labour
1931	Lawrence Kimball	Conservative
1945	Mont Follick	Labour
1955	John Cronin	Labour
1979	Stephen Dorrell	Conservative
1997	Andy Reed	Labour Co-operative
2010	Nicky Morgan	Conservative
2019	Jane Hunt	Conservative
2024	Jeevun Sandher	Labour

== Elections ==
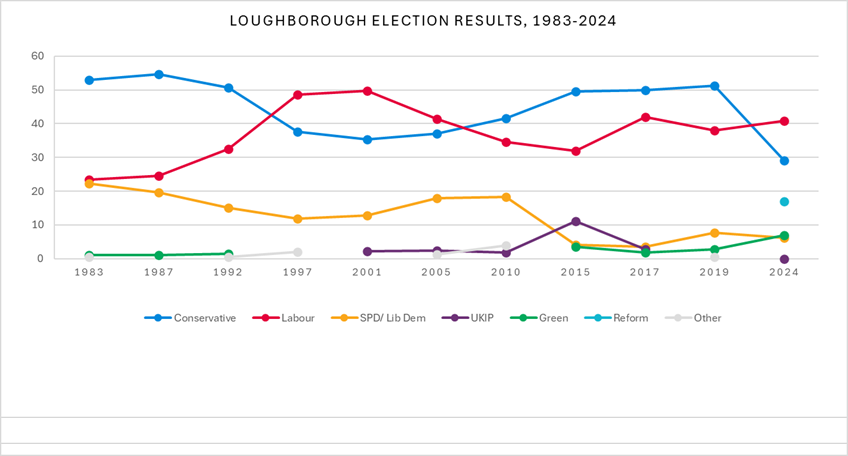
Loughborough election results 1983-2024

=== Elections in the 2020s ===
General election 2024: Loughborough
Party	Candidate	Votes	%	±%
Labour	Jeevun Sandher	17,249	40.8	+2.1
Conservative	Jane Hunt	12,289	29.1	–21.5
Reform	Andy McWilliam	7,204	17.0	N/A
Green	Hans Zollinger-Ball	2,956	7.0	+4.4
Liberal Democrats	Ian Sharpe	2,561	6.1	–1.5
Majority		4,960	11.7	N/A
Turnout		42,259	61.2	–8.6
Registered electors		68,996		–4,906
Labour gain from Conservative		Swing	+11.8	

2019 notional result
Party	Vote	%
Conservative	26,088	50.6
Labour	19,997	38.8
Liberal Democrats	3,935	7.6
Green	1,342	2.6
Others	235	0.5
Turnout	51,597	69.8
Electorate	73,902	

=== Elections in the 2010s ===
General election 2019: Loughborough
Party	Candidate	Votes	%	±%
Conservative	Jane Hunt	27,954	51.2	+1.3
Labour	Stuart Brady	20,785	38.0	–4.0
Liberal Democrats	Ian Sharpe	4,153	7.6	+4.0
Green	Wesley Walton	1,504	2.8	+1.0
Independent	Queenie Tea	235	0.4	New
Majority		7,169	13.1	+5.2
Turnout		54,631	68.5	+0.5
Registered electors		79,776		+169
Conservative hold		Swing	+2.6	

General election 2017: Loughborough
Party	Candidate	Votes	%	±%
Conservative	Nicky Morgan	27,022	49.9	+0.4
Labour	Jewel Miah	22,753	42.0	+10.1
Liberal Democrats	David Walker	1,937	3.6	–0.5
UKIP	Andy McWilliam	1,465	2.7	–8.3
Green	Philip Leicester	971	1.8	–1.8
Majority		4,269	7.9	–9.8
Turnout		54,148	68.0	–1.1
Registered electors		79,607		+4,390
Conservative hold		Swing	–4.9	

General election 2015: Loughborough
Party	Candidate	Votes	%	±%
Conservative	Nicky Morgan	25,762	49.5	+7.9
Labour	Matthew O'Callaghan	16,579	31.9	–2.6
UKIP	Bill Piper	5,704	11.0	+9.2
Liberal Democrats	Stephen Coltman	2,130	4.1	–14.2
Green	Matt Sisson	1,845	3.5	New
Majority		9,183	17.6	+10.5
Turnout		52,020	69.2	+1.0
Rejected ballots		217		
Total ballots		52,237		
Registered electors		72,644		–2,285
Conservative hold		Swing	+5.3	

General election 2010: Loughborough
Party	Candidate	Votes	%	±%
Conservative	Nicky Morgan	21,971	41.6	+4.3
Labour Co-op	Andy Reed	18,227	34.5	–6.7
Liberal Democrats	Mike Willis	9,675	18.3	+0.4
BNP	Kevan Stafford	2,040	3.9	New
UKIP	John Foden	925	1.8	–0.6
Majority		3,744	7.1	N/A
Turnout		52,838	68.2	+5.2
Registered electors		77,502		+3,310
Conservative gain from Labour Co-op		Swing	+5.5	

2005 notional result
Party	Vote	%
Labour	19,261	41.2
Conservative	17,445	37.3
Liberal Democrats	8,354	17.9
UKIP	1,112	2.4
Others	588	1.3
Turnout	46,760	63.0
Electorate	74,192	

=== Elections in the 2000s ===
The 2005 general election saw Andy Reed returned with a decreased majority after his share of the vote dropped by 8.3%. Loughborough was the 126th target seat of the Conservative Party and their share of the vote increased slightly but the Liberal Democrats had the largest increase. The swing of 5.0% from Labour to Conservative was higher than the national swing of 3.0% and turnout was above average.

General election 2005: Loughborough
Party	Candidate	Votes	%	±%
Labour Co-op	Andy Reed	19,098	41.4	–8.4
Conservative	Nicky Morgan	17,102	37.1	+1.7
Liberal Democrats	Graeme Smith	8,258	17.9	+5.1
UKIP	Bernard Sherratt	1,094	2.4	+0.3
Veritas	John McVay	588	1.3	New
Majority		1,996	4.3	–10.1
Turnout		46,140	63.8	+0.6
Registered electors		72,351		+2,274
Labour Co-op hold		Swing	–5.0	

General election 2001: Loughborough
Party	Candidate	Votes	%	±%
Labour Co-op	Andy Reed	22,016	49.7	+1.2
Conservative	Neil Lyon	15,638	35.3	−2.4
Liberal Democrats	Julie Simons	5,667	12.8	+1.0
UKIP	John Bigger	933	2.1	New
Majority		6,378	14.4	+3.5
Turnout		44,254	63.2	−12.8
Registered electors		70,077		+1,132
Labour Co-op hold		Swing	+1.8	

=== Elections in the 1990s ===
General election 1997: Loughborough
Party	Candidate	Votes	%	±%
Labour Co-op	Andy Reed	25,448	48.6	+8.8
Conservative	Ken Andrews	19,736	37.7	–9.1
Liberal Democrats	Diana Brass	6,190	11.8	+0.6
Referendum	Rama Gupta	991	1.9	New
Majority		5,712	10.9	N/A
Turnout		52,365	76.0	–0.9
Registered electors		68,945		+3,789
Labour Co-op gain from Conservative		Swing	+8.9	

1992 notional result
Party	Vote	%
Conservative	23,412	46.8
Labour	19,920	39.8
Liberal Democrats	5,635	11.3
Others	1,081	2.2
Turnout	50,048	76.8
Electorate	65,156	

General election 1992: Loughborough
Party	Candidate	Votes	%	±%
Conservative	Stephen Dorrell	30,064	50.7	–4.0
Labour	Andy Reed	19,181	32.4	+7.9
Liberal Democrats	Anthony Stott	8,953	15.1	–4.6
Green	Ian Sinclair	817	1.4	+0.3
Natural Law	P Reynolds	233	0.4	New
Majority		10,883	18.4	–11.9
Turnout		59,248	78.5	–0.7
Registered electors		75,450		+1,790
Conservative hold		Swing	–5.9	

=== Elections in the 1980s ===
General election 1987: Loughborough
Party	Candidate	Votes	%	±%
Conservative	Stephen Dorrell	31,931	54.7	+1.8
Labour Co-op	Christopher Wrigley	14,283	24.5	+1.0
SDP (Liberal)	Roger Fox	11,499	19.7	–2.5
Green	Rama Gupta	656	1.1	+0.0
Majority		17,648	30.2	+0.7
Turnout		58,369	79.2	+1.5
Registered electors		73,660		+2,992
Conservative hold		Swing	+0.4	

General election 1983: Loughborough
Party	Candidate	Votes	%	±%
Conservative	Stephen Dorrell	29,056	52.9	+0.9
Labour Co-op	Mike Jones	12,876	23.4	–9.3
SDP (Liberal)	John Frears	12,189	22.2	+7.8
Ecology	David Whitebread	591	1.1	+0.7
BNP	John Peacock	228	0.4	–0.1
Majority		16,180	29.5	+10.2
Turnout		54,940	77.7	–3.5
Registered electors		70,668		
Conservative hold		Swing	+5.1	

1979 notional result
Party	Vote	%
Conservative	27,186	52.0
Labour	17,103	32.7
Liberal	7,496	14.3
Others	477	0.9
Turnout	52,262	
Electorate		

=== Elections in the 1970s ===
General election 1979: Loughborough
Party	Candidate	Votes	%	±%
Conservative	Stephen Dorrell	29,788	48.0	+10.7
Labour	John Cronin	24,589	39.6	–1.9
Liberal	Reg Palmer	6,650	10.7	–8.2
Ecology	David Whitebread	595	1.0	New
National Front	John Peacock	484	0.8	–1.4
Majority		5,199	8.4	N/A
Turnout		62,106	81.2	+2.7
Registered electors		76,455		+6,229
Conservative gain from Labour		Swing	+6.3	

General election October 1974: Loughborough
Party	Candidate	Votes	%	±%
Labour	John Cronin	22,869	41.5	+2.9
Conservative	Richard Yorke	20,521	37.2	–0.2
Liberal	Maurice Bennett	10,409	18.9	–5.1
National Front	Ken Sanders	1,215	2.2	New
More Prosperous Britain	Harold Smith	125	0.2	New
Majority		2,348	4.3	+3.1
Turnout		55,139	78.5	–5.8
Registered electors		70,226		+567
Labour hold		Swing	+1.5	

General election February 1974: Loughborough
Party	Candidate	Votes	%	±%
Labour	John Cronin	22,643	38.6	–6.8
Conservative	Richard Yorke	21,946	37.4	–6.9
Liberal	Maurice Bennett	14,096	24.0	+13.7
Majority		697	1.2	+0.1
Turnout		58,685	84.3	+5.4
Registered electors		69,659		+6,095
Labour hold		Swing	+0.1	

General election 1970: Loughborough
Party	Candidate	Votes	%	±%
Labour	John Cronin	22,806	45.4	–4.8
Conservative	Rodney Elton	22,272	44.3	+7.3
Liberal	Jan Mokrzycki	5,185	10.3	–2.6
Majority		534	1.1	–12.1
Turnout		50,263	78.9	–3.4
Registered electors		63,564		
Labour hold		Swing	–6.1	

=== Elections in the 1960s ===
General election 1966: Loughborough
Party	Candidate	Votes	%	±%
Labour	John Cronin	22,935	50.2	+2.5
Conservative	Rodney Elton	16,911	37.0	–1.2
Liberal	Brian Stratford	5,875	12.9	–1.3
Majority		6,024	13.2	+3.7
Turnout		45,721	82.3	–1.6
Registered electors		55,583		
Labour hold		Swing		

General election 1964: Loughborough
Party	Candidate	Votes	%	±%
Labour	John Cronin	22,081	47.7	+0.5
Conservative	John Lawson Leatham	17,671	38.2	–0.8
Liberal	Geoffrey Smedley–Stevenson	6,558	14.2	+0.4
Majority		4,410	9.5	+1.3
Turnout		46,310	83.9	–0.1
Registered electors		55,193		
Labour hold		Swing		

=== Elections in the 1950s ===
General election 1959: Loughborough
Party	Candidate	Votes	%	±%
Labour	John Cronin	21,496	47.2	–7.7
Conservative	Clifford Geoffrey Waite	17,749	39.0	–6.1
Liberal	Raymond Hancock	6,303	13.8	New
Majority		3,747	8.2	–1.6
Turnout		45,548	84.0	+1.6
Registered electors		54,225		
Labour hold		Swing	–0.8	

General election 1955: Loughborough
Party	Candidate	Votes	%	±%
Labour	John Cronin	24,044	54.9	−2.1
Conservative	Michael Argyle	19,781	45.1	+2.1
Majority		4,263	9.8	−4.2
Turnout		43,825	82.4	−3.5
Registered electors		53,183		
Labour hold		Swing	–2.1	

General election 1951: Loughborough
Party	Candidate	Votes	%	±%
Labour	Mont Follick	25,894	57.0	–;0.5
Conservative	Phylis Spencer	19,571	43.0	+0.5
Majority		6,323	14.0	–1.0
Turnout		45,465	85.9	−1.1
Registered electors		52,914		
Labour hold		Swing	–0.5	

General election 1950: Loughborough
Party	Candidate	Votes	%	±%
Labour	Mont Follick	25,921	57.5	+4.2
Conservative	Samuel Field Middup	19,196	42.5	+11.2
Majority		6,725	15.0	–7.0
Turnout		45,117	87.0	+12.3
Registered electors		51,873		
Labour hold		Swing	–3.5	

=== Elections in the 1940s ===
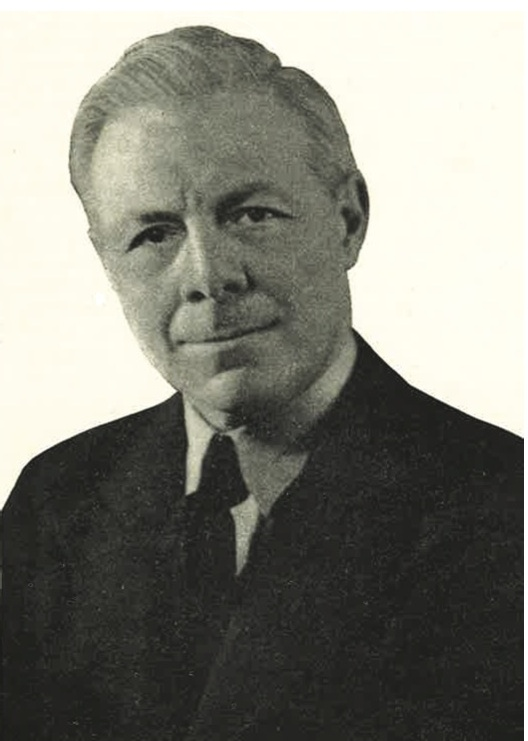
Mont Follick

General election 1945: Loughborough
Party	Candidate	Votes	%	±%
Labour	Mont Follick	21,152	53.3	+12.7
Conservative	Lawrence Kimball	12,401	31.3	–11.4
Liberal	Charles Lidbury	6,121	15.4	–1.3
Majority		8,751	22.0	N/A
Turnout		39,674	74.7	–2.7
Registered electors		53,086		
Labour gain from Conservative		Swing		

=== Elections in the 1930s ===
General election 1935: Loughborough
Party	Candidate	Votes	%	±%
Conservative	Lawrence Kimball	15,396	42.7	–18.0
Labour	George Winterton	14,653	40.6	+1.3
Liberal	Walter Meakin	6,003	16.7	New
Majority		743	2.1	–19.3
Turnout		36,052	77.4	–4.4
Registered electors		46,593		
Conservative hold		Swing		

General election 1931: Loughborough
Party	Candidate	Votes	%	±%
Conservative	Lawrence Kimball	22,310	60.7	+27.8
Labour	George Winterton	14,458	39.3	–0.7
Majority		7,852	21.4	N/A
Turnout		36,768	81.8	–3.4
Registered electors		44,954		
Conservative gain from Labour		Swing	+13.9	

=== Elections in the 1920s ===
General election 1929: Loughborough
Party	Candidate	Votes	%	±%
Labour	George Winterton	14,854	40.0	+5.1
Unionist	Frank Rye	12,210	32.9	–7.0
Liberal	Frank Gladstone Hines	10,044	27.1	+1.9
Majority		2,644	7.1	N/A
Turnout		37,108	85.2	+1.5
Registered electors		43,553		
Labour gain from Unionist		Swing	+6.0	

General election 1924: Loughborough
Party	Candidate	Votes	%	±%
Unionist	Frank Rye	11,114	39.9	+8.4
Labour	George Winterton	9,751	34.9	+2.4
Liberal	Edward Spears	7,040	25.2	–10.8
Majority		1,363	5.0	N/A
Turnout		27,905	83.7	+6.8
Registered electors		33,323		
Unionist gain from Liberal		Swing	+9.6	

General election 1923: Loughborough
Party	Candidate	Votes	%	±%
Liberal	Edward Spears	8,937	36.0	N/A
Labour	George Winterton	8,064	32.5	New
Unionist	Frank Rye	7,805	31.5	New
Majority		873	3.5	N/A
Turnout		24,806	76.9	N/A
Registered electors		32,243		
Liberal hold		Swing		

General election 1922: Loughborough
Party	Candidate	Votes	%	±%
National Liberal	Edward Spears	Unopposed		
Registered electors				
National Liberal hold				

=== Elections in the 1910s ===
General election 1918: Loughborough
Party		Candidate	Votes	%
C	National Liberal	Oscar Guest	11,918	65.1
	Labour	Herbert William Hallam	6,381	34.9
Majority			5,537	30.2
Turnout			18,299	59.8
Registered electors			30,581	
	National Liberal win (new boundaries)			
C indicates candidate endorsed by the coalition government.

Sir Maurice Levy

General election December 1910: Loughborough
Party	Candidate	Votes	%	±%
Liberal	Maurice Levy	6,488	52.3	–0.6
Conservative	Neville Woodford Smith-Carington	5,916	47.7	+0.6
Majority		572	4.6	–1.2
Turnout		12,404	90.2	–2.6
Registered electors				
Liberal hold		Swing	–0.6	

General election January 1910: Loughborough
Party	Candidate	Votes	%	±%
Liberal	Maurice Levy	6,760	52.9	−4.6
Conservative	Neville Woodford Smith-Carington	6,007	47.1	+5.6
Majority		753	5.8	−11.2
Turnout		12,767	92.8	+2.7
Registered electors				
Liberal hold		Swing	–5.1	

=== Elections in the 1900s ===
General election 1906: Loughborough
Party	Candidate	Votes	%	±%
Liberal	Maurice Levy	6,803	57.5	+7.2
Conservative	William Baring du Pré	5,023	42.5	−7.2
Majority		1,780	15.0	+14.4
Turnout		11,826	90.1	+5.0
Registered electors		13,126		
Liberal hold		Swing	+7.2	

General election 1900: Loughborough
Party	Candidate	Votes	%	±%
Liberal	Maurice Levy	4,897	50.3	−1.7
Conservative	Hussey Packe	4,830	49.7	+1.7
Majority		67	0.6	−3.4
Turnout		9,727	85.1	−3.4
Registered electors		11,428		
Liberal hold		Swing	–1.7	

=== Elections in the 1890s ===
General election 1895: Loughborough
Party	Candidate	Votes	%	±%
Liberal	Edward Johnson-Ferguson	4,732	52.0	–2.1
Conservative	Robert Lucas-Tooth	4,360	48.0	+2.1
Majority		372	4.0	−4.2
Turnout		9,092	88.5	+1.9
Registered electors		10,274		
Liberal hold		Swing	–2.1	

General election 1892: Loughborough
Party	Candidate	Votes	%	±%
Liberal	Edward Johnson-Ferguson	4,715	54.1	+4.9
Conservative	Edwin de Lisle	3,994	45.9	−4.9
Majority		721	8.2	N/A
Turnout		8,709	86.6	+0.5
Registered electors		10,060		
Liberal gain from Conservative		Swing	+4.9	

=== Elections in the 1880s ===
General election 1886: Loughborough
Party	Candidate	Votes	%	±%
Conservative	Edwin de Lisle	4,075	50.8	+7.0
Liberal	Edward Johnson-Ferguson	3,940	49.2	−7.0
Majority		135	1.6	N/A
Turnout		8,015	86.1	−4.4
Registered electors		9,313		
Conservative gain from Liberal		Swing	+7.0	

General election 1885: Loughborough
Party	Candidate	Votes	%
Liberal	Edward Johnson-Ferguson	4,733	56.2
Conservative	Montagu Curzon	3,693	43.8
Majority		1,040	12.4
Turnout		9,426	90.5
Registered electors		9,313	
Liberal win (new seat)			

== See also ==
- List of parliamentary constituencies in Leicestershire and Rutland

== Sources ==
- UK Genealogy Archives – History
- BBC News: Loughborough constituency – History and Boundaries
- Andy Reed MP | Loughborough Constituency – Boundaries
- British Parliamentary Election results 1983–1997 – Elections (1983–1992)
- UK General Elections since 1832 – Elections (1951–1979)
- McCalmont, Frederick Haynes, Stenton Michael, Vincent, John Russell. McCalmont's parliamentary poll book: British election results. (ISBN 0-85527-000-4)
- F. W. S. Craig. British Parliamentary Election Results 1950–1973. (ISBN 0-900178-07-8)
- F. W. S. Craig. British Parliamentary Election Results 1918–1949. (ISBN 0-900178-01-9)
