= Henry Parkman Jr. =

American politician (1894-1958)

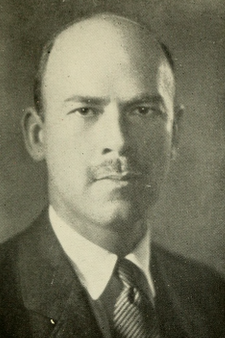
- Parkman c. 1935

Boston Corporation Counsel
- In office 1938–1940
- Preceded by: Henry E. Foley
- Succeeded by: Robert Cutler

Member of the Massachusetts Senate from the 3rd Suffolk District
- In office 1929–1937
- Preceded by: John William McCormack
- Succeeded by: Laurence Curtis

Boston City Councilor for Ward 5
- In office 1925–1929
- Preceded by: District Created
- Succeeded by: Laurence Curtis

Personal details
- Born: April 26, 1894 Boston, Massachusetts, U.S.
- Died: May 27, 1958 (aged 64) Boston, Massachusetts, U.S.
- Resting place: Forest Hills Cemetery and Crematory, Jamaica Plain, Massachusetts
- Party: Republican
- Spouse(s): Margaret Randolph Anderson Rotch 1919-1932 Doris Montague, 1936-death
- Relatives: Mary E. Peabody (sister); Endicott Peabody (nephew); Marietta Peabody Tree (niece)
- Education: Harvard College; Northeastern University School of Law
- Occupation: Lawyer, State Senator, Diplomat

Henry Parkman Jr. (April 26, 1894 – May 27, 1958) was an American politician who served in various offices in Massachusetts and the United States federal government.

== Early life ==
Parkman was born on April 26, 1894. His father, Henry Parkman Sr., was treasurer of the Provident Institution for Savings and served as a member of the Boston Common Council, Massachusetts House of Representatives, Massachusetts Senate, state prison commission, and a delegate to the Massachusetts Constitutional Convention of 1917. Parkman graduated from Harvard College in 1915 and attended Harvard Law School for two years before leaving to serve in the United States Army. During World War I, Parkman was a captain in the 76th and 80th Infantry Divisions. After the war, Parkman went in the transportation business, delivering goods from New England manufacturers to the Pacific Coast via the Panama Canal. He later finished his legal studies at Northeastern University Law School and was admitted to the bar in 1924. He joined the firm of Putnam, Bell, Dutch & Santry.

== Political career ==
On July 1, 1925, Parkman became the first person to announce his candidacy for the new 22-ward City Council. He was elected to represent Ward 5. In 1927, Parkman, a Republican, cast the deciding vote for John Heffernan, a Democrat, for council president. Heffernan's law office was in the same building as Parkman.

In 1928 he challenged long-time party leader Charles Hiller Innes in a high-profile contest to be the 11th Congressional District delegate to the Republican National Convention. Parkman ran a campaign against bossism and stated that "Mr. Innes does not represent the party, but only a small number who have made a business out of politics". It was the first time in 26 years that Innes face a serious challenger. Parkman topped the ticket with 8,055 votes and his running mate, G. Gordon Watt received 7,082 to votes to Innes 6,017 his running mate, Walter R. Meins', 5,989 votes in a contest where the top two were elected.

From 1929 to 1937, Parkman represented the 3rd Suffolk District in the Massachusetts Senate.

In 1933, Parkman for Mayor of Boston as a reform candidate. Parkman was expected to receive the endorsement of the Good Government Association, however the group backed Frederick Mansfield instead. Parkman also lost the endorsement of the Republican city committee to Malcolm E. Nichols. Parkman received 12% of the vote, which placed him behind Mansfield (28%), Nichols (27%), and William J. Foley (25%) and ahead of Joseph F. O'Connell (4%) and Michael H. Sullivan (4%).

In 1937, Parkman endorsed Democrat Maurice J. Tobin over fellow Republican Malcolm E. Nichols for Mayor of Boston. Tobin won the election appointed Parkman to the position of corporation counsel. He resigned the position on April 7, 1940, to run for the United States Senate seat held by David I. Walsh. Walsh defeated Parkman 56% to 42%. Following his defeat, Parkman was offered a position on the legal staff of United States Under Secretary of War Robert P. Patterson. Parkman withdrew his name from consideration due to opposition from Walsh and Massachusetts Democratic Party chairman William H. Burke Jr.

== World War II ==
During World War II, Parkman was a member of the state rationing board. In 1942 he was appointed state Office of Price Administration director. He resigned from the OPA in January 1943 to become a Lieutenant Colonel in the Army. He was assigned to the office of the Under Secretary of War. In August 1944, Parkman was made head of civil affairs in the South of France. His final post was a four-month stint in charge of the military government in Heidelberg under General Jacob L. Devers. He left the Army in the fall of 1945 with the rank of brigadier general. He was awarded the Legion of Merit, Legion of Honour, Croix de Guerre with palm, Distinguished Service Medal, and four campaign stars.

In April 1946, Parkman returned to Germany at the request of Lt. Gen. Lucius D. Clay to serve a one-year as chief of the Civil Administration Branch in the American zone. Parkman was persuaded to stay on and on February 21, 1947, it was announced that he would serve as Clay's governmental affairs adviser. He returned to the United States on September 23, 1947.

== Later career ==
Upon his return from Germany, Parkman joined the law firm of Hemenway and Barnes. In June 1947 he was nominated to serve on the board of trustees of the newly created Metropolitan Transit Authority. Later that year he was appointed by the Civil Service Commission to serve on a panel for federal workers whose loyalty to the United States was questioned.

In 1949, Parkman served as the American representative to the International Authority for the Ruhr. In 1950, Parkman became Chief of the Marshall Plan in France, with the diplomatic rank of Minister. In 1953, he was nominated for the position of Massachusetts Director of Civil Defense, however he withdrew in order to become assistant to United States High Commissioner for Germany James Bryant Conant.

== Personal ==
Parkman had 4 siblings: Edith (Homans), Mary E. Peabody, Penelope (Griswold), and Francis. He married Margaret Randolph Anderson Rotch in 1919; divorced in 1932. He married Doris Montague Leamy in 1936, and had three children: Penelope Frances (1937), Deborah (1938) and James Montague (1939). He also adopted his wife's daughter, Antonia Leamy, in 1937.

== Death ==
Parkman died on May 27, 1958, at Massachusetts General Hospital of coronary thrombosis.

== See also ==
- Massachusetts legislature: 1929–1930, 1931–1932, 1933–1934, 1935–1936

Party political offices
Preceded by Robert M. Washburn	Republican nominee for U.S. Senator from Massachusetts (Class 1); 1940	Succeeded by Henry Cabot Lodge Jr.
