= Desmond FitzGerald (CIA officer) =

American intelligence officer

- Born: June 16, 1910; Manhattan, New York
- Died: July 23, 1967 (aged 57); The Plains, Virginia
- Education: St. Mark's School; Harvard University; Harvard Law School
- Spouses: Marietta Peabody (m. 1938; div. 1947): Barbara Green Lawrence
- Children: Frances FitzGerald; Joan FitzGerald; Desmond FitzGerald Jr.
- Awards: Bronze Star; National Security Medal

Desmond FitzGerald (June 16, 1910 – July 23, 1967) was an American intelligence officer for the Central Intelligence Agency (CIA), where he rose to the position of Deputy Director of Plans. He served in the CIA from 1950 until his death. Posthumously he was awarded the National Security Medal. An attorney, he had worked in New York City both before and after World War II. During the war, he was an Army officer, serving as liaison and adviser to the Chinese Army.

== Early life ==
Desmond Fitzgerald was born in New York City in 1910, to Helen Jane Fitzgerald and Harold Fitzgerald, who was in banking. He was educated at St. Mark's School in Southborough, Massachusetts.

Fitzgerald earned an undergraduate degree from Harvard University. In 1935, Fitzgerald earned a law degree from Harvard University.

== Career ==
Fitzgerald worked for six years at a New York law firm.

At the outbreak of World War II Fitzgerald was "a 31-year-old attorney with a wife and a child" yet he enlisted as a private in the Army. He soon transferred to Officer Candidate School and was commissioned as an officer. His assignment was as liaison to the Republic of China Army operating in the China-Burma-India theater, where he was promoted to the rank of major and awarded the Bronze Star. He was linked with the Chinese 6th army which operated in Burma.

After the war, Fitzgerald returned to New York City, where he worked at a Wall Street law firm. He enjoyed connections with the city's elite social circles.

=== CIA ===
Fitzgerald was recruited to the CIA's Office of Policy Coordination by Frank Wisner in 1950. According to Prados, Fitzgerald worked in the CIA's Far East Division on a diverse array of projects, dealing with Tibet, China, Philippines, Japan and Korea. He became friends with William Colby, also in the Far East Division (Colby became DCI in 1973). Fitzgerald was especially interested in the Tibetan Task Force, which supported the continuing Tibetan resistance against the Maoist Chinese takeover and, particularly, the 1959 Tibetan uprising. He told officers to work with Tibetan leader Gyalo Dhondup.

He warned other officials against the agency becoming involved in a failed 1958 rebellion in Indonesia.

Ralph McGehee's CIA memoir mentions FitzGerald, describing him as Chief of Station in the Philippines in 1955 or 1956.

In January 1961, Fitzgerald approved James William Lair's proposal for arming Hmong guerrillas to fight in the Laotian Civil War.

In February 1964, Fitzgerald became chief of Western Hemisphere (WH) Division responsible for clandestine operations in Central America, South America, Caribbean and Cuba.

In 1964 Fitzgerald came into conflict with Secretary of Defense Robert McNamara over McNamara's demand for quantified information from Vietnam.

In June 1965, Fitzgerald was selected as Deputy Director of Plans, responsible for worldwide collection of foreign intelligence. Fitzgerald supervised the increase in personnel assigned to South Vietnam to support military operations. In one instance he asked Edgar Applewhite to attack Ramparts magazine as part of the CIA's Cold War strategy. Applewhite claimed he used "dirty tricks" and blackmail to harm the magazine's business.

Later, Fitzgerald worked on the CIA's accurate prediction of the outbreak of the Six-Day War in the Middle East between Egypt and Israel.

He was regarded highly by many, including Allen Dulles, who became director of the agency. Dulles described Fitzgerald as "an officer of imagination and sense of daring, backed by his credentials as a fellow Wall Street lawyer and his impeccable social connections, coupled with his ability to get things done." John Kenneth Galbraith, an economist and diplomat who was influential in the Kennedy administration, also admired him, although also describing Fitzgerald as reckless.

== Personal life ==
On September 2, 1938, Fitzgerald married Marietta Peabody (1917–1991), a daughter of the Rt. Rev. Malcolm Endicott Peabody and Mary Elizabeth Parkman. Following World War II, Fitzgerald divorced Marietta. Before their 1947 divorce, they were the parents of:

- Frances FitzGerald (b. 1940), a journalist and writer who won the Pulitzer Prize, Bancroft Prize, and National Book Award.

After their divorce, he married actress Barbara (née Green) Lawrence (1919–1973). Barbara, the daughter of Ralph Green of London and Hayes House in Frome, was the former wife of Connor F. Lawrence Jr. Before his death, they were the parents of:

- Joan FitzGerald.
- Desmond FitzGerald Jr., who married actress Lucinda McLean Ziesing in 1991.

In July 1967, while playing tennis with his wife, the British Ambassador to the United States Patrick Dean, and the ambassador's wife in The Plains, Virginia, Fitzgerald suffered a heart attack and died. He was 57. His funeral was attended by Vice President Hubert Humphrey, Senator Robert F. Kennedy and publisher Katharine Graham among others.

== Legacy and honors ==
He was posthumously awarded the National Security Medal by then President Lyndon B. Johnson.

== See also ==
- McNamara fallacy § 1964 meetings with Desmond FitzGerald

== Additional sources ==
- Conboy, Kenneth and James Morrison (1995). Shadow War: The CIA's Secret War in Laos. Paladin Press. ISBN 0-87364-825-0.
- Halberstam, David (1972). The Best and the Brightest. Random House. ISBN 978-0-449-90870-9.
- McGehee, Ralph (2002).Deadly Deceits: My 25 Years in the CIA. Ocean Press. ISBN 978-1876175191.
