= Esther Burgess =

American activist (1911–2004)

Esther Julia Burgess (1911 – 2004; née Taylor) was a nonviolent campaigner in the Civil Rights movement. She was the wife of Reverend John Melville Burgess, the first Black bishop within the American Episcopal Church.

== St. Augustine Sit-in Protest ==
In March 1964, Mrs. Burgess travelled from her home in Newton, Massachusetts, to St. Augustine, Florida, as part of a delegation of both white and black church members inspired by Reverend Martin Luther King Jr. She participated in a peaceful sit-in opposing segregation together with several other wives of ministers, including Mary Peabody, who was the wife of Reverend Malcolm Peabody, and the mother of Endicott Peabody, the sitting Governor of Massachusetts. They were joined by Dr. Robert B. Hayling, a Black dentist who had studied nonviolent protest methods and was a local leader in the Southern Christian Leadership Conference. After sitting in the restaurant at the Ponce de Léon Motor Lodge, Esther Burgess was arrested and went to jail along with Dr. Hayling. When Mary Peabody then returned the next day to the restaurant with another group, she was also arrested and spent two nights in jail.

The ensuing publicity called attention to the injustices of segregation. The mounting demonstrations in St. Augustine were part of the long build-up to the eventual passage three months later of the Civil Rights Act.

== Personal life ==
Esther Taylor was born in New Brunswick, Canada, one of five children. Their father was a farmer. She graduated with honors from Fredericton High School and worked as a stenographer before leaving Canada in 1943 to attend St. Augustine College in Raleigh, North Carolina.
