= David Nolan (American author) =

American writer (born 1946)

David Nolan is an American author, civil rights activist, and historian.

== Early life ==
Nolan was born in Cambridge, Massachusetts in 1946, the son of journalist Joseph T. Nolan and his artist wife Virginia.

He attended public schools in Bayside, New York and Waterbury, Connecticut, studied at the University of Virginia, and was active in the American Civil Rights Movement of the 1960s.

== Career in Florida ==
Since 1977 he has made his home in St. Augustine, Florida, known as the "nation's oldest city." From 1978 to 1980 he worked on the first official survey of old buildings in the Ancient City.

His first book, Fifty Feet in Paradise: The Booming of Florida, dealing with the booms and busts in the state's colorful real estate history, was published by Harcourt Brace Jovanovich in 1984, and he received the annual author's award from the Council for Florida Libraries.

He was a contributor to a literary tour guide of the state called The Book Lover's Guide to Florida that was published by Pineapple Press in 1992.

In 1995 he collaborated with artist Jean Ellen Fitzpatrick and photographer Ken Barrett to produce The Houses of St. Augustine, which has become the bestselling book about the Ancient City and its historic buildings.

== Civil rights ==
He was a founder in 2002 of ACCORD (an acronym for "Anniversary to Commemorate the Civil Rights Demonstrations"), a group designed to honor the participants in the St. Augustine movement during the Civil Rights Movement. Demonstrations in St. Augustine in 1963 and 1964 led by Dr.Robert Hayling and Dr. Martin Luther King Jr. resulted in the passage of the landmark Civil Rights Act of 1964, one of the two great legislative accomplishments of the movement. ACCORD has launched a permanently marked Freedom Trail of historic sites of the civil rights movement that has gained international publicity. On July 2, 2014—the fiftieth anniversary of the signing of the Civil Rights Act of 1964—ACCORD opened the first civil rights museum in Florida, at 79 Bridge Street in St. Augustine, the former dental office of Dr. Robert Hayling.

During Black History Month in 2009, Nolan received the Governor's Points of Light Award for outstanding community service.

On July 2, 2009, the 45th anniversary of the signing of the Civil Rights Act of 1964, he received the President's Volunteer Service Award from Barack Obama.

== Other pursuits ==
He has served as president of the Marjorie Kinnan Rawlings Society and trustee of the Fort Mose Historical Society.

He is a lecturer on historic, architectural, and literary subjects.

== Works ==
- Nolan, David, Fifty Feet in Paradise: The Booming of Florida, New York: Harcourt Brace Jovanovich, 1984, ISBN 0-15-130748-2
- Nolan, David, with paintings by Jean Ellen Fitzpatrick and photographs by Ken Barrett Jr., The Houses of St. Augustine, Sarasota: Pineapple Press, 1995, ISBN 1-56164-069-7
