= Endicott Peabody =

American politician (1920–1997)

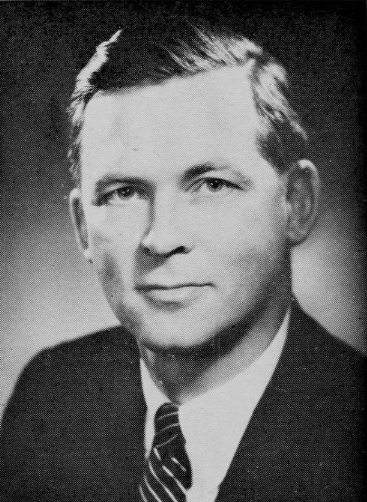
- Peabody in 1962

62nd Governor of Massachusetts
- In office January 3, 1963 – January 7, 1965
- Lieutenant: Francis Bellotti
- Preceded by: John A. Volpe
- Succeeded by: John A. Volpe

Member of the Massachusetts Governor's Council from the 3rd district
- In office 1955–1957
- Preceded by: David B. Williams
- Succeeded by: Christian A. Herter, Jr.

Personal details
- Born: February 15, 1920 Lawrence, Massachusetts, U.S.
- Died: December 2, 1997 (aged 77) Hollis, New Hampshire, U.S
- Party: Democratic
- Spouse: Barbara Welch Gibbons (m. 1944)
- Children: 3
- Parent(s): Malcolm E. Peabody; Mary E. Peabody
- Relatives: John Endecott (ancestor); Endicott Peabody (grandfather); Henry Parkman (grandfather); Henry Parkman Jr. (uncle); Marietta Peabody Tree (sister); Desmond FitzGerald (former brother-in-law); Ronald Tree (brother-in-law); Frances FitzGerald (niece); Penelope Tree (niece)
- Education: Harvard University (AB, JD)

Military service
- Allegiance: United States
- Branch/service: United States Navy
- Battles/wars: World War II: Pacific War
- Awards: Silver Star
- Football career

Personal information
- Listed height: 6 ft 0 in (1.83 m)
- Listed weight: 181 lb (82 kg)

Career information
- High school: Groton (Massachusetts); Penn Charter (Philadelphia)
- College: Harvard (1939–1941)

Awards and highlights
- Unanimous All-American (1941); First-team All-Eastern (1941)
- College Football Hall of Fame (Class of 1973)

Endicott Howard Peabody (February 15, 1920 – December 2, 1997) was an American politician from Massachusetts. A Democrat, he served a single two-year term as the 62nd governor of Massachusetts, from 1963 to 1965. His tenure is probably best known for his categorical opposition to the death penalty and for signing into law the bill establishing the University of Massachusetts Boston. After losing the 1964 Democratic gubernatorial primary, Peabody made several more failed bids for office in Massachusetts and New Hampshire, including failed campaigns for the U.S. Senate in 1966 and 1986.

Born in Lawrence, Massachusetts to a family with deep colonial roots, Peabody played college football at Harvard University, where he earned honors as an All-American lineman. He served in the United States Navy in World War II before embarking on a political career noted more for its failures than its successes. He made multiple unsuccessful attempts to win the position of Massachusetts Attorney General, and for the United States Senate representing both Massachusetts and New Hampshire, and ran for United States Vice President in 1972.

== Early life ==
Endicott Peabody, nicknamed "Chub", was born in Lawrence, Massachusetts, the son of Mary Elizabeth (née Parkman) and the Reverend Malcolm E. Peabody, an Episcopal Bishop of Central New York. He was a grandson of the founder of Groton School and Brooks School, also named Endicott Peabody, and was a descendant of colonial governor John Endecott. His maternal grandfather, Henry Parkman, was a Boston businessman and politician.

Peabody first attended the William Penn Charter School, and graduated in 1938 from the Groton School. He earned his A.B. from Harvard College in 1942, majoring in history. Peabody played on the Harvard Crimson football team and also played ice hockey and tennis. He stood out in football, where he was known as the "baby-faced assassin", playing three seasons on the varsity squad, and was the only unanimous choice for the 1941 College Football All-America Team. He was awarded the Knute Rockne Memorial Trophy for best collegiate lineman in 1941, and was inducted into the College Football Hall of Fame in 1973.

Peabody served in the United States Navy during World War II, primarily as a Lieutenant aboard the USS Tirante in the Pacific Ocean theater. He led several boarding parties involving hand-to-hand combat, for which he was awarded several commendations including the Silver Star.

== Early forays into politics ==
While serving in the war, Peabody decided to embark on a career in politics. After the war ended, he attended Harvard Law School, receiving his J.D. degree and attaining admission to the Massachusetts bar in 1948. His first political work was on the 1948 presidential campaign of Harry S. Truman. Truman appointed him an Assistant Regional Counsel for the Office of Price Stabilization in 1950 and Regional Counsel for the Small Defense Plants Administration in 1952. In 1954 he won election to the Massachusetts Governor's Council, serving one two-year term. In 1958, Peabody ran for Attorney General of Massachusetts, but lost in the Democratic primary to Edward McCormack, Jr. by nine percentage points. In 1960, he ran for Governor of Massachusetts, but came in second (out of seven candidates) in the Democratic primary with 25.5% of the vote. In that year's presidential election, he coordinated John F. Kennedy's campaigns in West Virginia, Pennsylvania, and New Hampshire.

== Governorship ==
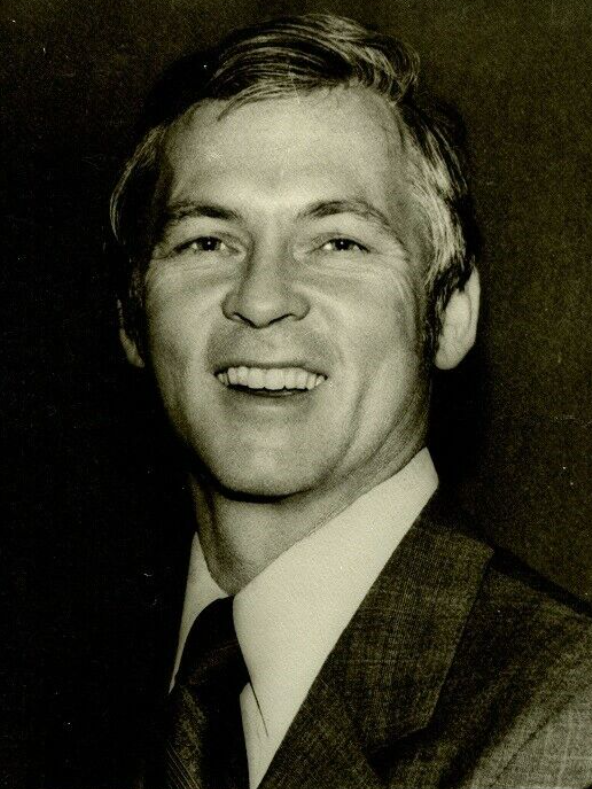
Peabody in 1971.

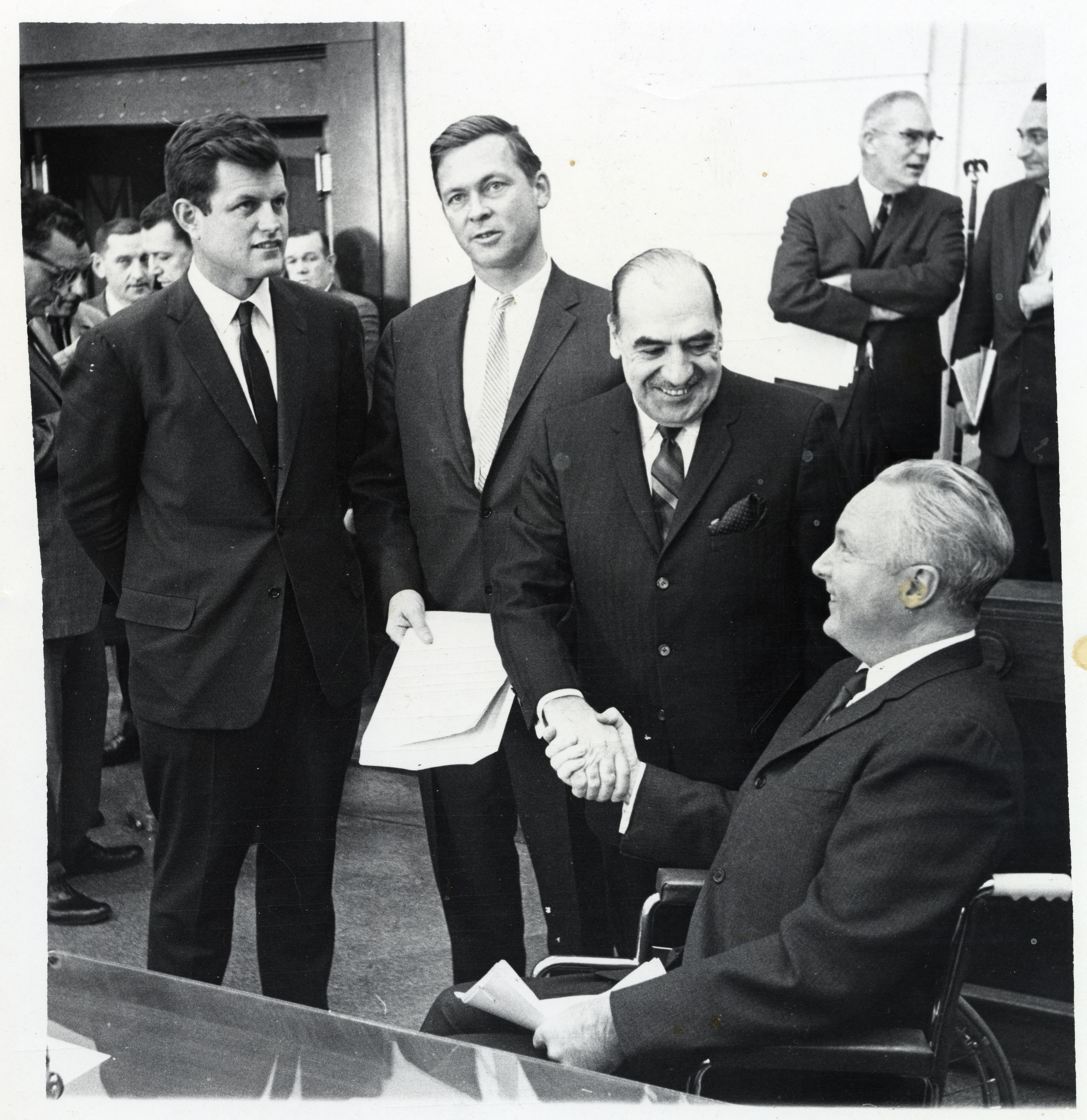
Peabody with Massachusetts U.S. Senator Ted Kennedy and Boston Mayor John F. Collins in January 1964.

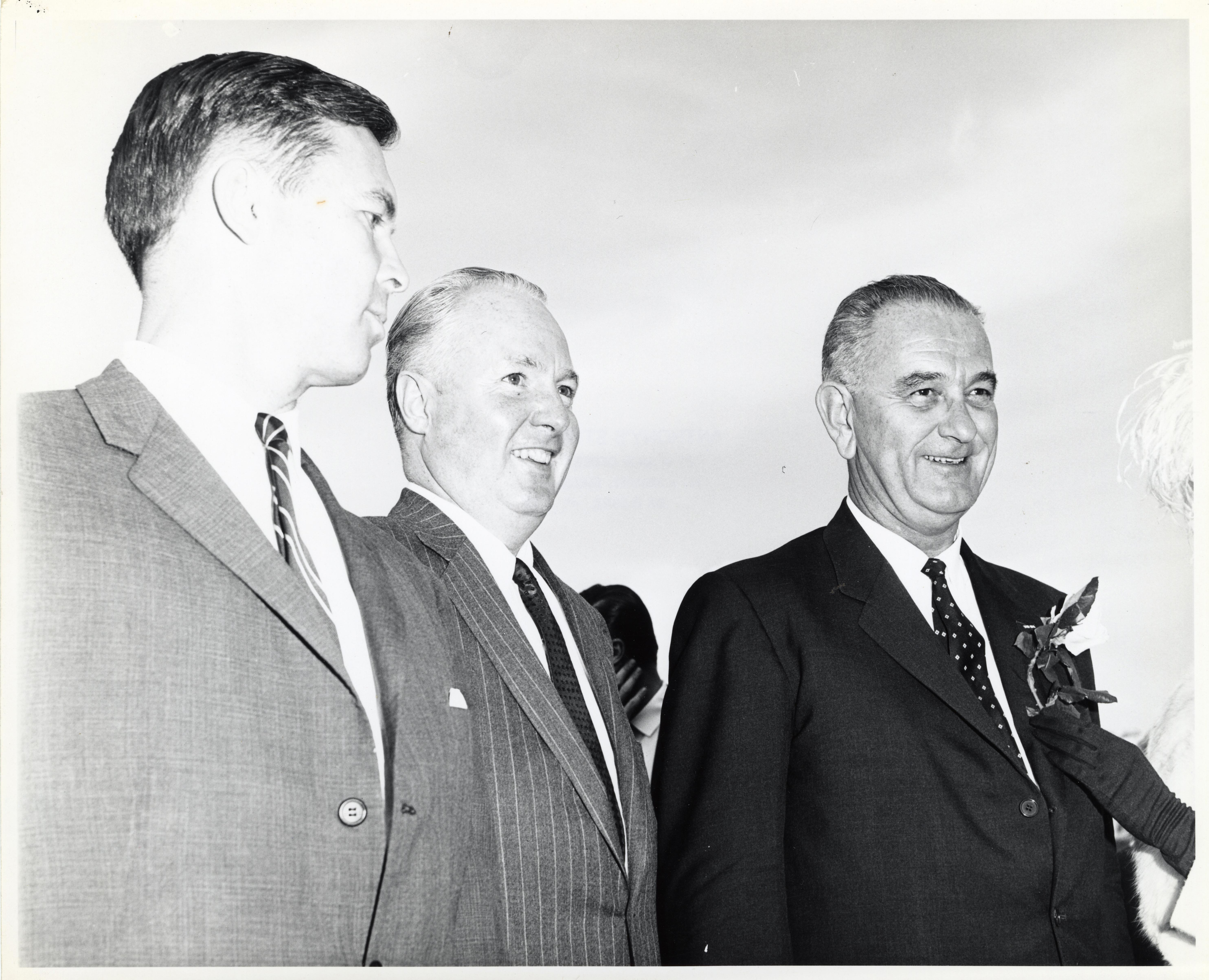
Peabody (left) with Boston Mayor John F. Collins and President Lyndon B. Johnson

In the 1962 gubernatorial election, Peabody was victorious in the race for governor, upsetting the Republican incumbent John A. Volpe by only 4,431 votes out of over two million cast. Peabody's campaign manager was his law partner Joseph M. Koufman. Peabody was aided in the victory by endorsements from President Kennedy, and by the coattails of Ted Kennedy's victory in the coinciding race for the president's former United States Senate seat.

During his administration, voters approved a state constitutional amendment extending the terms of office of all state constitutional officers from two years to four years, starting from the next election. Peabody advocated laws to prevent discrimination in housing and to establish drug addiction treatment programs. He also strongly opposed capital punishment and "vowed that he would not sign a death warrant even for the Boston Strangler, if he were ever caught and convicted." This position was controversial, especially because several police officers were killed in the line of duty in the state during his tenure. Peabody recommended the commutation of every death sentence that he reviewed while governor. Massachusetts' last executions took place in 1947, though the penalty itself remained in force. On June 18, 1964, Peabody signed into law the bill establishing the University of Massachusetts Boston.

On April 1, 1964, the governor's 72-year-old mother, Mary Parkman Peabody, made headlines when she was arrested at the Ponce de Leon Motor Lodge in St. Augustine, Florida, for attempting to be served in an integrated group at a racially segregated restaurant. The action made her a hero to the civil rights movement and brought civil rights efforts in St. Augustine, the nation's oldest city, to national and international attention.

In 1964, Lt. Gov. Francis X. Bellotti mounted a primary campaign against Peabody for the Democratic gubernatorial nomination. Although Peabody was supported by Senator Kennedy and the party convention, Bellotti was victorious in the primary. Peabody's loss was variously attributed to his controversial opposition to the death penalty, his stiff demeanor in television appearances, and a bruising defeat he suffered early in his term in opposing the winning candidate for Speaker of the Massachusetts General Court. Bellotti subsequently lost the general election to John Volpe.

== Post-governorship ==
=== Senate campaign ===
In 1966, Peabody ran for the U.S. Senate, for which there was an open seat that year as a result of the retirement of Leverett Saltonstall; he won the Democratic nomination but was defeated by a landslide in the general election by the Republican nominee, the liberal state Attorney General Edward Brooke.

=== 1972 vice presidential election ===
Peabody undertook a quixotic campaign for Vice President of the United States on the Democratic ticket in 1972; he came in fourth in the balloting at the 1972 Democratic National Convention. He ran under the slogan "Endicott Peabody, the number one man for the number two job."

=== New Hampshire ===
In 1983, he moved to Hollis, New Hampshire, where he ran unsuccessfully for local and statewide political office several times, including for the U.S. Senate in 1986 against the Republican incumbent, Warren Rudman.

In 1992, Peabody ran again for vice president by competing in the New Hampshire vice-presidential primary, where he won with 59.7% of the vote. However, the primary is non-binding, and, at the prerogative of the presidential nominee, Bill Clinton of Arkansas, the vice-presidential nomination eventually went to Al Gore of Tennessee. Clinton and Gore subsequently won the general election.

Also in 1992, Peabody ran for a seat in the New Hampshire House of Representatives, but he came in third place with 20.7% of the vote.

Peabody died from leukemia in Hollis in 1997, aged 77. His remains were interred in Groton, Massachusetts.

== Family ==
On June 24, 1944, Peabody married Barbara Welch "Toni" Gibbons (1922–2012), a native of Bermuda. She was the elder daughter of Morris Gibbons, a member of the Parliament of Bermuda, and his wife, Maude Madge Welch. Peabody and his wife had a daughter, Barbara, and two sons, Robert and Endicott Jr.

Peabody's sister, Marietta Peabody Tree, represented the United States on the United Nations Commission on Human Rights.

== Navy awards ==
- Silver Star
- Presidential Unit Citation for USS Tirante
- American Campaign Medal
- Asiatic-Pacific Campaign Medal with two battle stars
- World War II Victory Medal

== Electoral history ==
Endicott Peabody electoral history

1958 Democratic primary for Massachusetts attorney general
Party	Candidate	Votes	%
Democratic	Edward J. McCormack Jr.	238,477	54.63%
Democratic	Endicott Peabody	198,016	45.37%
Write-in		12	0.00%
Total votes		436,505	100.00%

Massachusetts Democratic gubernatorial primary, 1960
Party	Candidate	Votes	%
Democratic	Joseph D. Ward	180,848	30.23%
Democratic	Endicott Peabody	152,762	26.53%
Democratic	Francis E. Kelly	98,107	16.40%
Democratic	Robert F. Murphy	76,577	12.80%
Democratic	John Francis Kennedy	52,972	8.85%
Democratic	Gabriel Piemonte	28,199	4.71%
Democratic	Alfred Magaletta	8,826	1.48%
Write-in	All others	3	0.00%
Total votes		598,294	100.00%

1962 Massachusetts gubernatorial election
Primary election
Party	Candidate	Votes	%
Democratic	Endicott Peabody	596,533	79.96
Democratic	Clement A. Riley	149,499	20.04
Total votes		746,052	100.00
General election
Democratic	Endicott Peabody	1,052,322	49.92
Republican	John A. Volpe (incumbent)	1,047,891	49.71
Socialist Labor	Henning A. Blomen	5,477	0.26
Prohibition	Guy S. Williams	2,394	0.11
Total votes		2,108,084	100.00
Democratic gain from Republican			

1964 Massachusetts Democratic gubernatorial primary
Party	Candidate	Votes	%
Democratic	Francis X. Bellotti	363,675	49.61
Democratic	Endicott Peabody (incumbent)	336,780	45.94
Democratic	John J. Droney	27,357	3.73
Democratic	Pasquale Caggiano	5,250	0.72
Total votes		733,062	100.00%

1966 U.S. Senate election in Massachusetts
Primary election
Party	Candidate	Votes	%
Democratic	Endicott Peabody	320,967	50.35
Democratic	John F. Collins	265,016	41.85
Democratic	Thomas Boylston Adams	51,435	8.07
Total votes		637,418	100.00
General election
Republican	Edward Brooke	1,213,473	60.68
Democratic	Endicott Peabody	774,761	38.74
Socialist Labor	Lawrence Gilfedder	6,790	0.34
Prohibition	Mark R. Shaw	4,833	0.24
Total votes		1,999,857	100.00
Republican hold			

1972 Democratic National Convention (Vice Presidential tally)

- Thomas Eagleton – 1,742 (59.07%)
- Frances Farenthold – 405 (13.73%)
- Mike Gravel – 226 (7.66%)
- Endicott Peabody – 108 (3.66%)
- Clay Smothers – 74 (2.51%)
- Birch Bayh – 62 (2.10%)
- Peter W. Rodino – 57 (1.93%)
- Jimmy Carter – 30 (1.02%)
- Shirley Chisholm – 20 (0.68%)
- Moon Landrieu – 19 (0.64%)
- Edward T. Breathitt – 18 (0.61%)
- Ted Kennedy – 15 (0.51%)
- Fred R. Harris – 14 (0.48%)
- Richard G. Hatcher – 11 (0.37%)
- Harold Hughes – 10 (0.34%)
- Joseph Montoya – 9 (0.31%)
- William L. Guy – 8 (0.27%)
- Adlai Stevenson III – 8 (0.27%)
- Robert Bergland – 5 (0.17%)
- Hodding Carter – 5 (0.17%)
- César Chávez – 5 (0.17%)
- Wilbur Mills – 5 (0.17%)
- Wendell Anderson – 4 (0.14%)
- Stanley Arnold – 4 (0.14%)
- Ron Dellums – 4 (0.14%)
- John J. Houlihan – 4 (0.14%)
- Roberto A. Mondragon – 4 (0.14%)
- Reubin O'Donovan Askew – 3 (0.10%)
- Herman Badillo – 3 (0.10%)
- Eugene McCarthy – 3 (0.10%)
- Claiborne Pell – 3 (0.10%)
- Terry Sanford – 3 (0.10%)
- Ramsey Clark – 2 (0.07%)
- Richard J. Daley – 2 (0.07%)
- John DeCarlo – 2 (0.07%)
- Ernest Gruening – 2 (0.07%)
- Roger Mudd – 2 (0.07%)
- Edmund Muskie – 2 (0.07%)
- Claude Pepper – 2 (0.07%)
- Abraham A. Ribicoff – 2 (0.07%)
- Hoyt Patrick Taylor, Jr. – 2 (0.07%)
- Leonard F. Woodcock – 2 (0.07%)
- Bruno Agnoli – 2 (0.07%)
- Ernest Albright – 1 (0.03%)
- William A. Barrett – 1 (0.03%)
- Daniel Berrigan – 1 (0.03%)
- Philip Berrigan – 1 (0.03%)
- Julian Bond – 1 (0.03%)
- Skipper Bowles – 1 (0.03%)
- Archibald Burton – 1 (0.03%)
- Phillip Burton – 1 (0.03%)
- William Chappell – 1 (0.03%)
- Lawton Chiles – 1 (0.03%)
- Frank Church – 1 (0.03%)
- Robert Drinan – 1 (0.03%)
- Nick Galifianakis – 1 (0.03%)
- John Z. Goodrich – 1 (0.03%)
- Michael Griffin – 1 (0.03%)
- Martha Griffiths – 1 (0.03%)
- Charles Hamilton – 1 (0.03%)
- Patricia Harris – 1 (0.03%)
- Jim Hunt – 1 (0.03%)
- Daniel Inouye – 1 (0.03%)
- Henry M. Jackson – 1 (0.03%)
- Robery Kariss – 1 (0.03%)
- Allard K. Lowenstein – 1 (0.03%)
- Mao Zedong – 1 (0.03%)
- Eleanor McGovern – 1 (0.03%)
- Martha Beall Mitchell – 1 (0.03%)
- Ralph Nader – 1 (0.03%)
- George Norcross III – 1 (0.03%)
- Jerry Rubin – 1 (0.03%)
- Frederic Seaman – 1 (0.03%)
- Joe Smith – 1 (0.03%)
- Benjamin Spock – 1 (0.03%)
- Patrick Tavolacci – 1 (0.03%)
- George Wallace – 1 (0.03%)

1986 U.S. Senate election in New Hampshire
Primary election
Party	Candidate	Votes	%
Democratic	Endicott Peabody	20,568	61.18
Democratic	Robert L. Dupay	6,108	18.17
Democratic	Robert A. Patton	3,721	11.07
Democratic	Andrew D. Tempelman	2,601	7.74
Write-in		619	1.84
Total votes		33,617	100.00
General election
Republican	Warren Rudman (incumbent)	154,090	62.96
Democratic	Endicott Peabody	79,222	32.37
Independent	Bruce Valley	11,423	4.67
Total votes		244,735	100.00
Republican hold			

1992 New Hampshire Democratic vice presidential primary:

- Endicott Peabody – 34,533 (59.68%)
- Susan K.Y. Shargal – 20,347 (35.16%)
- Ralph Nader* – 1,097 (1.90%)
- Mario Cuomo* – 739 (1.28%)
- Paul Tsongas* – 649 (1.12%)
- Bob Kerrey* – 502 (0.87%)

New Hampshire House of Representatives Hillsborough District #22 election, 1992

- Susan B. Durham (R) – 2,089 (31.32%)
- George W. Wright (R) – 1,925 (28.86%)
- Endicott Peabody (D) – 1,378 (20.66%)
- Barbara Peabody (D) – 1,279 (19.17%)

(* – write-in candidate)

== Sources ==
- Baltzell, Edward (1987) [1964]. The Protestant Establishment: Aristocracy & Caste in America. New Haven: Yale University Press. ISBN 9780300038187. OCLC 1013182915.
- Herman, Jennifer (2008). Massachusetts Encyclopedia. Hamburg, MI: State History Publications. ISBN 9781878592651. OCLC 198759722.
- Molotsky, Irvin (December 4, 1997). "Obituary — Endicott Peabody, 77, Dies; Governor of Massachusetts in 60's". The New York Times.
- Porter, David L, ed. (1995). Biographical Dictionary of American Sports. Westport, CT: Greenwood Publishing Group. ISBN 9780313284311. OCLC 30812419.

Political offices
Preceded by John A. Volpe	Governor of Massachusetts; January 3, 1963 – January 7, 1965	Succeeded by John A. Volpe
Party political offices
Preceded by Joseph D. Ward	Democratic nominee for Governor of Massachusetts; 1962	Succeeded by Francis Bellotti
Preceded by Thomas J. O'Connor	Democratic nominee for U.S. Senator from Massachusetts (Class 2); 1966	Succeeded by John J. Droney
Preceded by John A. Durkin	Democratic nominee for U.S. Senator from New Hampshire (Class 3); 1986	Succeeded by John Rauh
