= Penelope Tree =

English fashion model

- Born: December 2, 1949 (age 76); New York City, New York
- Occupation: Fashion model
- Years active: 1960s onwards
- Known for: Swinging Sixties
- Notable work: The Rutles (1978 film)
- Spouse: Ricky Fataar
- Partner(s): David Bailey; Stuart MacFarlane
- Children: 2
- Parents: Ronald Tree (father); Marietta Peabody Tree (mother)
- Relatives: Jeremy Tree (half-brother); Frances FitzGerald (half-sister)

Penelope Tree (born 2 December 1949) is an English fashion model who rose to prominence during the Swinging Sixties in London.

== Family ==
Penelope Tree is the only child of Marietta Peabody Tree, a U.S. socialite and political activist, and Ronald, a British journalist, investor and Conservative MP. She is the half-sister of racehorse trainer Jeremy Tree and author Frances FitzGerald, and she is a niece of former Massachusetts governor Endicott Peabody.

== Life and career ==
Tree's family initially objected to her career as a model, and when she was first photographed at age 13 by Diane Arbus, her father vowed to sue if the pictures were published.

Tree made a striking appearance at the 1966 Black and White Ball thrown by author Truman Capote, wearing a black V-neck tunic with long slashes from the bottom making floating panels, worn over black tights.

The sensation she caused led photographers Cecil Beaton and Richard Avedon to work together to make her a supermodel. She was 16 and her father had relented. David Bailey described Penelope as "an Egyptian Jiminy Cricket".

In 1967, Tree moved into Bailey's flat in London's Primrose Hill neighbourhood. It became a social space for hippies during the "Swinging Sixties" who, Bailey recalled, would be "smoking joints I had paid for and calling me a capitalist pig!" In another famous quote, when John Lennon was asked to encapsulate Tree in three words, he replied, "Hot, Hot, Hot, Smart, Smart, Smart!"

Scars from late-onset acne ended her career in the early 1970s: "I went from being sought-after to being shunned because nobody could bear to talk about the way I looked." In 1972, she was arrested for possession of cocaine. In 1974, Bailey and Tree split up and she moved to Sydney. She appeared in the British comedy film The Rutles in 1978.

She was married to South African musician Ricky Fataar (a member of The Flames, The Rutles, and the Beach Boys). She has two children: Paloma Fataar, a graduate of Bard College and a student of Tibetan Buddhism and music; and Michael MacFarlane, by her relationship with Australian Jungian analyst Stuart MacFarlane.

Penelope Tree is a patron of Lotus Outreach, a charity which works in Cambodia in partnership with local grassroots women's organisations to give girls from the very poorest families the wherewithal to go to school.

In 1983, English indiepop band Felt released a song called "Penelope Tree", featuring a picture of her on the cover.

In 2011, Tree appeared as an interviewee for a documentary on the life of fashion editor Diana Vreeland.

In 2017, she was interviewed for a documentary about Beaton called Love, Cecil.

In 2024, her first novel, Piece Of My Heart, was published by Moonflower.
