= 1962 Massachusetts gubernatorial election =

- November 6, 1962
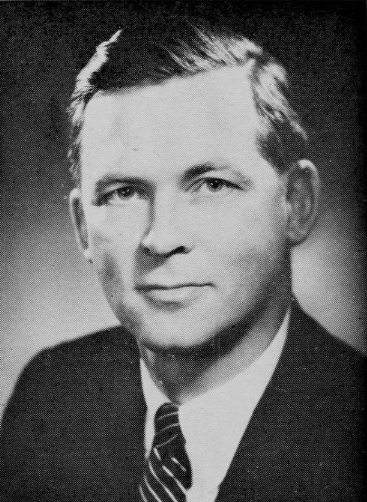

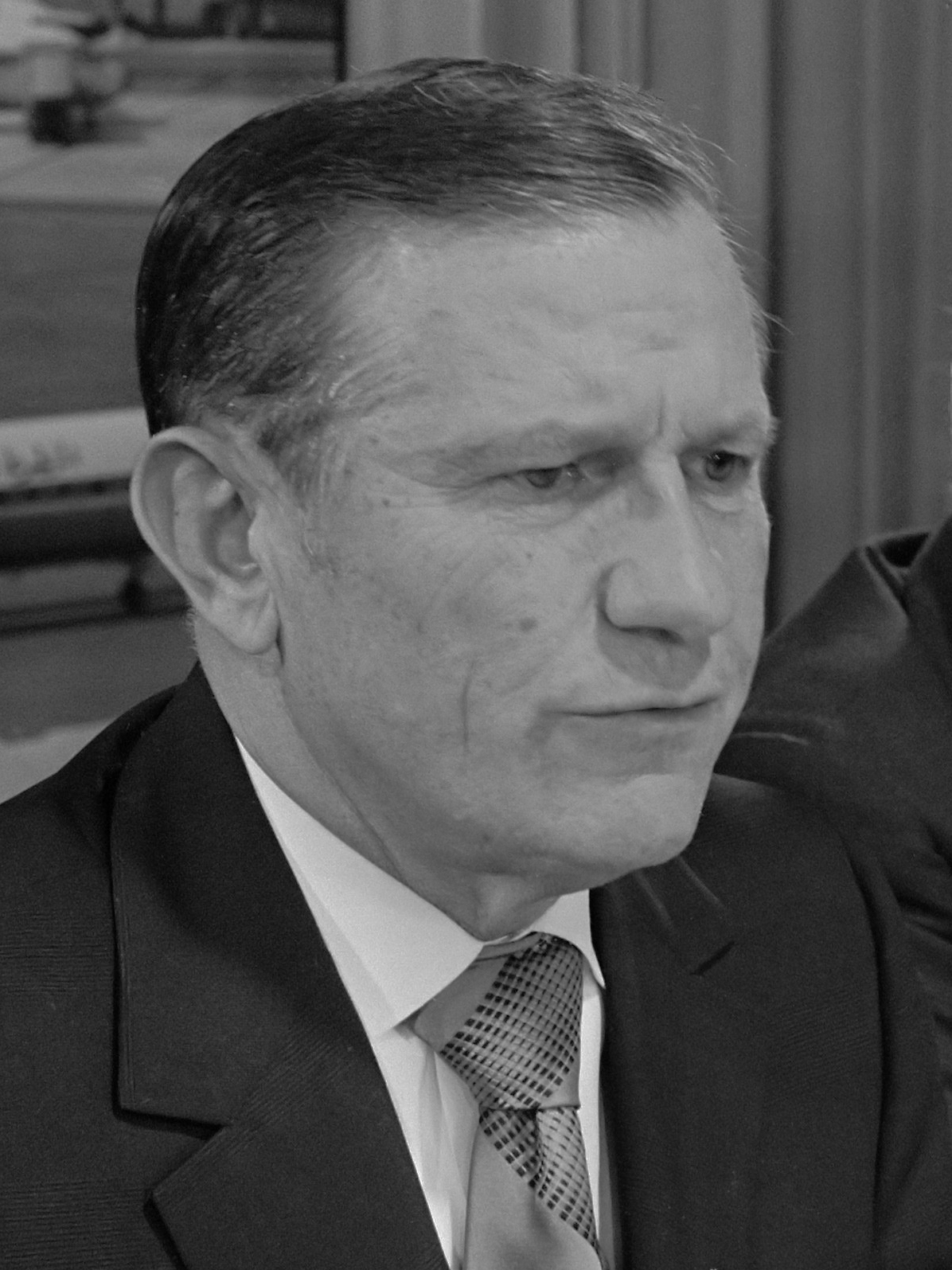
Nominee	Endicott Peabody	John Volpe
Party	Democratic	Republican
Popular vote	1,052,322	1,047,891
Percentage	49.92%	49.71%
- Peabody: 40–50% 50–60% 60–70% 70–80% Volpe: 40–50% 50–60% 60–70% 70–80% 80–90%
Governor before election
John Volpe
Republican
Elected Governor
Endicott Peabody
Democratic

The 1962 Massachusetts gubernatorial election was held on November 6, 1962. Former Executive Councilor Endicott Peabody defeated incumbent Governor John A. Volpe in the general election.

The election is notable as a demonstration of the political individualism of Italian Americans and historic lack of ethnic bloc voting among Americans of Italian descent, instead preferring to vote based on individual candidates and issues. John Volpe, just the second Massachusetts governor of Italian ancestry, lost his 1962 re-election campaign by a razor-thin 0.21%—a final margin that could be more than sufficiently explained by Volpe polling only 51% among the state's significant population of Italian Americans, roughly half of whom voted for the old-line Anglo-Saxon Protestant Endicott Peabody over a fellow ethnic.

== Republican primary ==
=== Candidates ===
- John Volpe, incumbent governor

=== Results ===
Governor Volpe was unopposed for renomination.

== Democratic primary ==
=== Candidates ===
- Endicott Peabody, member of the Massachusetts Governor's Council
- Clement A. Riley, auto registrar

=== Results ===
1962 Massachusetts Democratic gubernatorial primary
Party	Candidate	Votes	%
Democratic	Endicott Peabody	596,553	79.96%
Democratic	Clement A. Riley	149,499	20.04%
Total votes		746,052	100.00%

== General election ==
=== Results ===
Peabody defeated Volpe by 4,431 votes. Peabody's slim margin of victory prompted a recount. On December 20, Volpe conceded the election to Peabody.

1962 Massachusetts gubernatorial election
Party	Candidate	Votes	%	±%
Democratic	Endicott Peabody	1,052,322	49.92%	▲3.13
Republican	John A. Volpe (incumbent)	1,047,891	49.71%	▼2.80
Socialist Labor	Henning A. Blomen	5,477	0.26%	▼0.13
Prohibition	Guy S. Williams	2,394	0.11%	▼0.20
Total votes		2,108,084	100.00%	

==== Results by county ====
County	John Volpe Republican		Endicott Peabody Democratic		All others		Margin		Total votes
County	#	%	#	%	#	%	#	%	Total votes
Barnstable	20,075	69.6%	8,740	30.3%	46	0.2%	-11,335	-39.3%	28,861
Berkshire	29,048	50.7%	27,984	48.8%	294	0.5%	-1,064	-1.9%	57,236
Bristol	66,188	40.0%	98,737	59.6%	616	0.3%	32,549	19.6%	165,541
Dukes	1,798	64.0%	1,001	35.6%	12	0.4%	-797	-28.4%	2,811
Essex	129,896	50.3%	127,767	49.5%	695	0.3%	-2,129	-0.8%	258,358
Franklin	14,002	61.2%	8,800	38.5%	62	0.2%	-5,202	-22.7%	22,864
Hampden	75,041	48.4%	78,990	50.9%	1,171	0.8%	3,949	2.5%	155,202
Hampshire	19,269	50.8%	18,563	48.9%	128	0.3%	-706	-1.9%	37,960
Middlesex	276,833	52.8%	245,779	46.9%	1,448	0.3%	-31,054	-5.9%	524,060
Nantucket	1,210	74.6%	409	25.2%	3	0.2%	-801	-49.4%	1,622
Norfolk	127,674	55.9%	100,073	43.8%	594	0.3%	-27,601	-12.1%	228,341
Plymouth	59,107	57.1%	44,148	42.7%	204	0.2%	-14,959	-14.4%	103,459
Suffolk	107,228	38.8%	167,253	60.5%	1,990	0.7%	60,025	21.7%	276,471
Worcester	120,522	49.0%	125,078	50.8%	608	0.2%	4,556	1.8%	246,208
Totals	1,053,322	49.9%	1,047,891	49.7%	7,876	0.4%	5,431	0.2%	2,109,089

Counties that flipped from Republican to Democratic

- Hampden

== See also ==
- 1961–1962 Massachusetts legislature
