= Robert Hayling =

American dentist and activist

- Born: Robert Bagner Hayling; November 20, 1929; Tallahassee, Florida, U.S.
- Died: December 20, 2015 (aged 86); Fort Lauderdale, Florida, U.S.
- Education: Florida A&M University; Meharry Medical College
- Occupation: Dentist
- Known for: St. Augustine movement
- Spouse: Athea Wake

Robert Bagner Hayling (November 20, 1929 – December 20, 2015) was an American dentist and civil rights activist.

== Early life ==
Robert Bagner Hayling was born in Tallahassee, Florida, to Charles C. Hayling Sr., an academic who had a 33-year career at Florida A&M University, and Cleo Bagner Hayling. He and his three siblings all attended Florida A&M, in addition to receiving graduate education. In 1951, he was commissioned as a second lieutenant in the US Air Force, serving for four years, before moving to Nashville, Tennessee, to study dentistry. He received a Doctor of Dental Surgery degree from Meharry Medical College School of Dentistry in 1960, where he first became involved in civil rights by participating in marches and lunch counter sit-ins.

== Career ==
He began his dental practice in St. Augustine becoming the first African-American dentist to be elected to the local, regional, and national components of the American Dental Association. He actively embraced the growing cause of civil rights, becoming the adult advisor to the Youth Council of the National Association for the Advancement of Colored People (NAACP).

He led the group in protests against plans to celebrate St. Augustine's 400th birthday as the nation's oldest European settlement on an all-white basis. When Vice President Lyndon Johnson came to the city in 1963 to dedicate the first of the restored buildings on St. George Street, it was to be followed by a banquet for whites only at the city's famous Ponce de Leon Hotel. In tense negotiations, a small number of blacks were invited in return for a promise not to picket the event. However, an agreement to have city officials listen to the concerns of the black community was not honored, leaving Hayling skeptical of promises from Washington politicians.

Hayling encouraged members of the youth council to participate in lunch counter sit-ins, which led to a group of them, known as The "St. Augustine Four" spending six months in jail and reform school. Parents of the students were promised a reprieve if they signed documents stating that Hayling had "contributed to the delinquency of minors" and if they agreed that their children would not participate in further civil rights activities. They all refused.

Hayling and three companions (James Jackson, Clyde Jenkins, and James Hauser) were kidnapped and taken to a Ku Klux Klan rally in September 1963, where they were seriously beaten and narrowly escaped death. They were then charged with assaulting the Ku Klux Klan. As he gained a reputation for militance, Hayling was threatened with the revocation of the group's charter by NAACP Executive Secretary Roy Wilkins during a phone conversation. Hayling replied, "I will mail you your charter" and vowed to continue his activities without the support of the NAACP.

During a conference in Orlando, Rev. Charles Kenzie Steele introduced Hayling to civil rights movement leader Martin Luther King Jr.; Hayling soon became President of the Florida Branch of King's Southern Christian Leadership Conference. He invited King to St Augustine in the spring of 1964, which was chosen as the battle ground for forcing the passage of the Civil Rights Act of 1964. Hayling issued a call to college students throughout the United States to come St. Augustine for spring break, not to go to the beach but to take part in the demonstrations. Mary Parkman Peabody, the mother of sitting Massachusetts Governor Endicott Peabody came with three other prominent Boston women at Easter 1964, including Esther Burgess, to aid of the activists. Peabody, Burgess and Hayling were arrested for trying food at the segregated Ponce de Leon Motor Lodge Restaurant. Photographs of Peabody being arrested made international news and let the world know what was happening in St. Augustine.

Hayling's dental practice in St. Augustine was adversely affected by his civil rights leadership, and in 1965, he moved south along the Florida Coast to Cocoa, Florida. There were many reasons underlying his decision - especially as the Brevard County area was rapidly expanding with an influx of new residents because of the Apollo Space Program. He could help find good positions for other St. Augustine activists. Perhaps most significantly, Hayling could help organize civil rights activities in the county. His office in the Elks Lodge in Cocoa became the home for the ACLU of Brevard County. In December 1968, he hosted the annual chapter meeting and fundraiser, inviting his SCLC colleague Hosea Williams as the speaker.

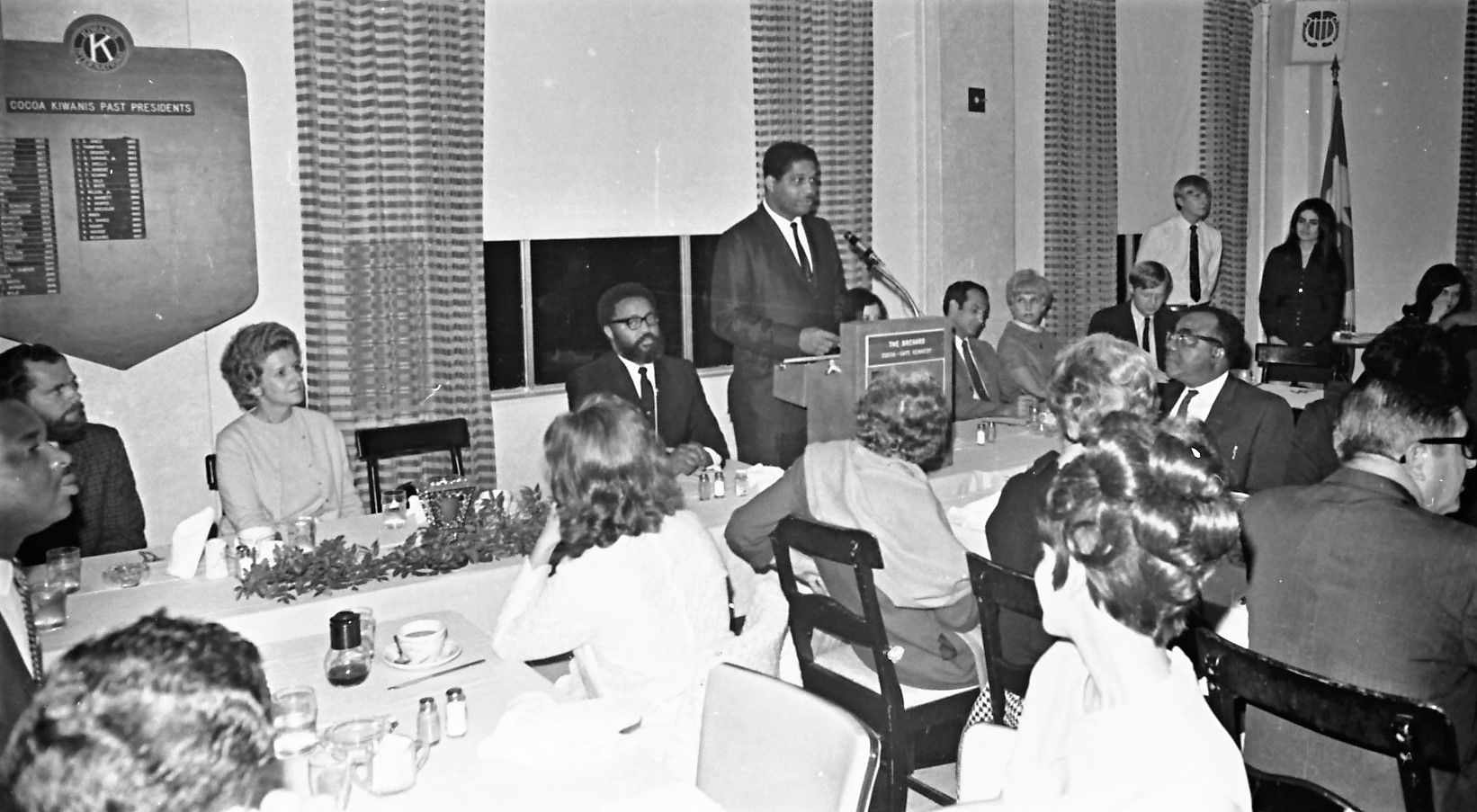
Dr. Robert Hayling address the attendees of the 7 Dec 1968 ACLU of Brevard County annual meeting in Cocoa, Florida, and introducing the speaker, the Rev. Hosea Williams.

The event, coupled with Hayling's leadership, and with the assistance of local attorney Stanley Wolfman and Cape Canaveral activist Anthony M. Rutkowski, helped make the County Chapter one of the most active in the State as it undertook several noted civil right cases.

In the 1970s, Dr. Hayling moved to Fort Lauderdale with his family, and he practiced dentistry there until his retirement.

== Later life ==
In 2003, the street on which his home had been shot up in 1964 was renamed Dr. R. B. Hayling Place. In later years, he was given the two highest awards of the city of St. Augustine: the De Aviles Award and the Order of La Florida, making him the most honored citizen in St. Augustine's history. He returned frequently to St. Augustine: to participate in the groundbreaking for a museum at Fort Mose, to dedicate the monument in the downtown plaza to the Foot Soldiers of the Civil Rights Movement, and to cut the ribbon for the opening of the first civil rights museum in Florida on the 50th anniversary of the signing of the landmark Civil Rights Act of 1964 (in his old dental office at 79 Bridge Street). He was senior adviser to ACCORD, an organization founded in 2002 to honor the participants in the St. Augustine movement, and he participated in the creation of a Freedom Trail of historic sites of the movement.

In 2014, he was inducted into the Florida Civil Rights Hall of Fame, along with A. Philip Randolph and James Weldon Johnson. A plaque honoring Hayling is on the wall, just outside the governor's office in the Florida state capitol building in Tallahassee. During the induction ceremony, Hayling noted that as a youngster, he used to mow the lawn at the Capitol.

== Legacy ==
His early and steadfast leadership in the cause of civil rights in St. Augustine has been recognized in many ways. He was a 2012 Recipient of the Florida A&M University Distinguished Alumni Award; received a Doctor of Humane Letters from Florida Memorial University and that school's Nathan W. Collier Meritorious Service Award "recognizing his courage, vision, fortitude, and service on behalf of mankind;" and was honored at the Florida Dental Association's convention in 2015. After his death, a memorial tribute was held in the rotunda of the state capitol building. The largest park in St. Augustine was named in his honor: Dr. Robert B. Hayling Freedom Park.

Hayling has been written about in many books of civil rights history: by Taylor Branch, David Colburn, Deric Gilliard, Andrew Young, Ralph Abernathy, Dan Warren, and others. Before his death, he was one of the outstanding surviving grassroots leaders of the civil rights movement of the 1960s.
