= 1986 United States Senate election in New Hampshire =

- November 4, 1986
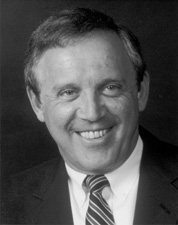

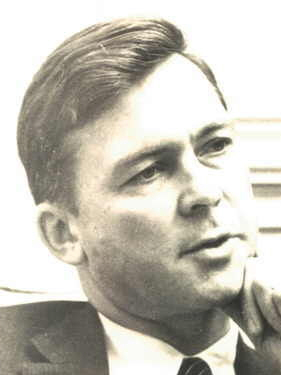
Nominee	Warren Rudman	Endicott Peabody
Party	Republican	Democratic
Popular vote	154,090	79,222
Percentage	62.96%	32.37%
- Rudman: 40–50% 50–60% 60–70% 70–80% 80–90% Peabody: 40–50% 50–60% >90%
U.S. senator before election
Warren Rudman
Republican
Elected U.S. Senator
Warren Rudman
Republican

The 1986 United States Senate election in New Hampshire took place on November 4, 1986. Incumbent Republican Senator Warren Rudman ran for re-election to a second term. He was initially challenged in the Republican primary by conservative Bruce Valley, a retired U.S. Navy commander, but Valley was disqualified from running in the primary. Instead, Valley ran as an independent in the general election. Rudman's main opponent was Endicott Peabody, the former governor of Massachusetts and the Democratic nominee, who sought the nomination to prevent an adherent of the LaRouche movement from winning the party's nomination. While national Democrats hoped that Valley's participation in the race would split the Republican vote, potentially aiding Peabody, Rudman ultimately won re-election in a landslide, winning 63 percent of the vote to Peabody's 32 percent and Valley's 5 percent.

== Democratic primary ==
=== Candidates ===
- Endicott Peabody, former governor of Massachusetts
- Robert L. Dupay, former Nashua alderman
- Robert A. Patton, Rye golf club maker and adherent of the LaRouche movement
- Andrew Tempelman, Milford innkeeper

=== Campaign ===
In the lead-up to the 1986 election, few prominent Democratic candidates were interested in running against Rudman, who was perceived as popular and likely to win re-election. Many of the most prominent Democrats in state, including former U.S. Senator John A. Durkin, whom Rudman had defeated in 1980 United States Senate election in New Hampshire; former U.S. Representative Norman D'Amours, who lost to Gordon Humphrey for the state's other seat 2 years earlier; former State House Minority Leader Chris Spirou; State Representative Wayne King; and State Democratic Party Chair George Bruno, all declined to run. However, when Robert Patton, a golf club maker and adherent of the LaRouche movement, announced his candidacy, the state party moved to recruit a credible candidate to prevent "embarrassment." Former Massachusetts Governor Endicott Peabody, who moved to the state in the early 1980s and practiced law in Nashua, was recruited to run, and ultimately declared his candidacy on May 14, 1986. Robert Dupay, a former Nashua alderman who had previously run for governor, Executive Council, and Congress, also joined the primary, saying, "The main thing is to go after the LaRouche guy, that's my No. 1 responsibility."

=== Results ===
Democratic primary results
Party	Candidate	Votes	%
Democratic	Endicott Peabody	20,568	61.61%
Democratic	Robert L. Dupay	6,108	18.30%
Democratic	Robert A. Patton	3,721	11.15%
Democratic	Andrew Tempelman	2,601	7.79%
Democratic	Write-ins	385	1.15%
Total votes		33,383	100.00%

== Republican primary ==
=== Candidates ===
- Warren Rudman, incumbent U.S. senator

=== Results ===
Republican primary results
Party	Candidate	Votes	%
Republican	Warren Rudman (inc.)	52,003	97.89%
Republican	Write-ins	1,121	2.11%
Total votes		53,124	100.00%

== General election ==
=== Results ===
1986 United States Senate election in New Hampshire
Party	Candidate	Votes	%	±%
Republican	Warren Rudman (inc.)	154,090	62.96%	+10.81%
Democratic	Endicott Peabody	79,225	32.37%	−15.48%
Independent	Bruce L. Valley	11,423	4.67%	—
Majority		74,865	30.59%	+26.29%
Total votes		244,738	100.00%	
Republican hold				

== See also ==
- 1986 United States Senate elections
