= Henry Parkman =

American politician (1850–1924)

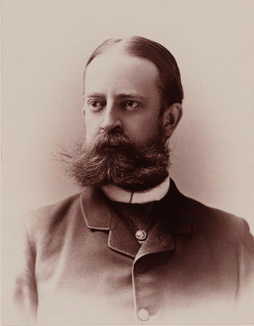
- Parkman c. 1888

Member of the Massachusetts Senate from the 5th Suffolk District
- In office 1892–1893
- Preceded by: Henry H. Sprague
- Succeeded by: George P. Sanger Jr.

Member of the Massachusetts House of Representatives from the 9th Suffolk district
- In office 1886–1888 Serving with Julius Caesar Chappelle (1886); William Oscar Armstrong (1887–1888)
- Succeeded by: Frank Morison; Andrew Berkley Lattimore

Member of the Boston Common Council
- In office 1879–1884

Personal details
- Born: May 23, 1850 Boston, Massachusetts, U.S.
- Died: June 24, 1924 (aged 74) Boston, Massachusetts, U.S.
- Party: Republican
- Spouse: Mary Frances Parker (m. 1890)
- Children: 5 (including Henry Parkman Jr. and Mary E. Peabody)
- Relatives: Endicott Peabody (grandson); Marietta Peabody Tree (granddaughter)
- Education: Harvard College; Harvard Law School
- Occupation: Lawyer; Bank treasurer

Henry Parkman (May 23, 1850 – June 24, 1924) was an American politician who was a member of the Boston Common Council and both chambers of the Massachusetts General Court.

== Early life ==
Parkman was born on May 23, 1850 in Boston to Dr. Samuel and Mary Eliot (Dwight) Parkman. He attended Epes Sargent Dixwell's private school and graduated from Harvard College in 1870.

== Business career ==
Parkman graduated from Harvard Law School in 1874 and was admitted to the bar that same year. He was a member of Russell and Putnam until 1882, when he entered solo practice. Parkman specialized in administration, trust funds, and estate law and was a trustee of many of Boston's larger estates. He practiced law until 1895, when he elected treasurer of the Provident Institution for Savings.

== Politics ==
Parkman was a member of the Boston Common Council from 1879 to 1884, the Massachusetts House of Representatives from 1886 to 1888, and the Massachusetts Senate from 1892 to 1893. From 1894 to 1915, he was a member of the Massachusetts State Prison Commission. He was also chairman of the Boston Republican city committee, chairman of a commission investing Boston's finances, and a member of the Boston City Hospital board of trustees.

== Personal life ==
Parkman was involved with a number of charitable organizations. He was president of the Adams-Nervine Asylum and a director of the Massachusetts Charitable Eye and Ear Infirmary and the Boston Training School for Nurses. Parkman was also a member of many of Boston's leading clubs, including The Country Club, Union Club of Boston, St. Botolph Club, and Eastern Yacht Club.

Parkman was a founding member of the Boston Athletic Association. He was chair of the club's first governing committee and helped organize and incorporate the organization. He was president of the B.A.A. from 1891 to 1896.

In 1890, he married Mary Frances Parker of Newark, New Jersey. They had five children, including Henry Parkman Jr. and Mary E. Peabody. His grandchildren included Endicott Peabody and Marietta Peabody Tree.

Parkman died on June 24, 1924 at Massachusetts General Hospital.
