= Marietta Peabody Tree =

American socialite (1917–1991)

- Born: Marietta Endicott Peabody; April 17, 1917; Lawrence, Massachusetts, U.S.
- Died: August 15, 1991 (aged 74); New York City, U.S.
- Education: St. Timothy's School
- Alma mater: University of Pennsylvania
- Occupations: Socialite, political supporter
- Spouse(s): Desmond FitzGerald (1939–1947); Ronald Tree (1947–1976)
- Children: Frances FitzGerald; Penelope Tree
- Parent(s): Malcolm Endicott Peabody; Mary Elizabeth Parkman
- Relatives: Rev. Endicott Peabody (grandfather); Henry Parkman (grandfather); Henry Parkman Jr. (uncle); Endicott Peabody (brother)

Marietta Peabody Tree (April 12, 1917 – August 15, 1991) was an American socialite and political reporter, who represented the United States on the United Nations Commission on Human Rights, appointed under the administration of John F. Kennedy.

== Early life ==
Peabody was the only daughter of Malcolm Endicott Peabody, the rector of Grace Episcopal Church in Lawrence, Massachusetts, and Mary Elizabeth Parkman, a dedicated charity volunteer, who encouraged her daughter to become involved with the community. Her paternal grandfather Rev. Endicott Peabody was founder and first headmaster of Groton School, where her four brothers Endicott, Samuel, George, and Malcolm were educated. Her maternal grandfather, Henry Parkman, was a Boston businessman and politician.

Tree attended St. Timothy's School, where she excelled in athletics. She undertook a grand tour of Europe and finishing school in Florence upon graduation to avoid college. When asked to predict her own future, she wrote down: "Parties, people, and politics."

Her father insisted that she attend college, and she enrolled at the University of Pennsylvania in 1936. Although she withdrew from the Class of 1940, in later interviews she would exclaim: "I'll never stop being grateful to my father for forcing me to go to college. It changed my life." In 1964 she was presented with an honorary Doctor of Laws degree, and in 1971 with an honorary Bachelor of Arts. She was also a member of Alpha Kappa Alpha sorority.

== Marriage to Desmond FitzGerald ==
During college, Marietta was courted by New York City lawyer Desmond FitzGerald. The couple married on September 2, 1939. A year later, Marietta gave birth to a daughter Frances FitzGerald, who became a noted journalist and historian.

Her ardent liberal Democratic views clashed with those of her Republican husband and apparently created tensions in the marriage. After America entered the Second World War in December 1941, Marietta accepted a post as part of the American delegation assisting the British Ministry of Information.

During the war years, Marietta became romantically involved with the film director John Huston. When her husband returned at the end of the war Huston departed for California at her request to wait for her to obtain a divorce. At that point, however, Marietta and her husband traveled to Barbados to stay with Nancy and Ronald Tree, a grandson of retail magnate Marshall Field and MP for Harborough, Leicestershire.

== Marriage to Ronald Tree ==
Marietta began an affair with Tree during her visit to Barbados in 1945. Tree and Peabody divorced their spouses at the end of World War II and married on July 26, 1947. Marietta moved into Tree's home, Ditchley Park, but found herself bored with English country life. Tree and most of his friends were Conservatives, and Democrat Marietta again found herself politically isolated. Their daughter Penelope was born in 1949.

Short of money, Tree sold Ditchley and agreed to return to New York City with Marietta, her daughter Frances Fitzgerald and their own daughter, future '60s fashion model Penelope Tree, and his butler Collins.

== Politics and Adlai Stevenson ==
Marietta Tree immediately joined the Lexington Democratic Club, and two years later was elected the county chairwoman. She was elected to the Democratic State Committee in 1954.

Tree began an affair with Adlai Stevenson in 1952, the year of his first unsuccessful presidential campaign. Tree’s husband was unfazed by the affair, perhaps due to his bisexuality, and even invited Stevenson to the couple's homes in New York, Barbados and London.

Stevenson and Tree continued their affair through his unsuccessful 1956 presidential campaign. Afterward, however, Stevenson began to take other lovers. Tree also retained a connection to Huston, who gave her a role in his 1960 movie The Misfits. She was, according to friends of Huston, the only woman he ever really loved, but also the woman who walked away.

In 1961, John F. Kennedy named her the United States Representative to the United Nations Commission on Human Rights, where she was able to work directly under Stevenson, who had been named head of the American delegation. She served in this position from 1961 to 1964.

On July 14, 1965, Tree and Stevenson were walking in London when he suffered a heart attack, and later died at St George's Hospital. That night, she wrote in her diary: "Adlai is dead. We were together."

== Later life ==
She and her husband remained married, though estranged. Ronald Tree died of a stroke on July 14, 1976, in London, while Marietta was in New York.

Her affair with English architect Richard Llewelyn-Davies ended with his sudden death in 1981.

Tree supported herself in later years by getting herself appointed to several well-paid directorships, including the boards of CBS, Pan Am, and Lendlease of Australia. She also served as women's trustee on the board of the University of Pennsylvania.

In 1987 she appeared in the Danny Huston film Mr. North, released about a month before John Huston died of emphysema on August 28, 1987.

== Death ==
Tree died of breast cancer on August 15, 1991, in New York Hospital.

== Character ==
Isaiah Berlin characterized her political leanings as "a progressive, liberal figure who was mixed up with a lot of naive left-wing sympathizers." As the feminist movement gained momentum in the 1960s, Marietta refused to support its cause, and in 1967 she refused to sign three resolutions pertaining to women's rights.

== Filmography ==
Year	Title	Role	Notes
1961	The Misfits	Susan	Uncredited
1988	Mr. North	Amanda Venable	(final film role)
