= Fire in the Lake =

1972 book by Frances FitzGerald

Fire in the Lake: The Vietnamese and the Americans in Vietnam
- Author: Frances FitzGerald
- Language: English
- Publisher: Little, Brown and Company and Back Bay Publishing
- Publication date: 1972
- Publication place: United States
- ISBN: 0-316-28423-8

Fire in the Lake: The Vietnamese and the Americans in Vietnam (1972) is a book by American journalist Frances FitzGerald (1940-) about Vietnam, its history and national character, and the United States warfare there. It was initially published by both Little, Brown and Company and Back Bay Publishing. The book was ranked by critics as one of the top books of the year, it was on the New York Times bestseller list for more than 10 weeks, and it won the Pulitzer Prize for General Nonfiction, the Bancroft Prize for history, the National Book Award and the Hillman Prize. It was published in paperback in 1973 by Vintage Books.

== Summary ==
This was the first major book by an American on Vietnam, its history, and the United States activities there. FitzGerald said it was a "first draft of history." She explored thousands of years of the history and culture of Vietnam, showing how these affected the relations of its peoples with their encounter with the United States. She says that the US understood little about the country and its leaders, reacting to the threat of communism rather than recognizing the nation's long struggle to gain and keep its independence from foreign invaders.

She argued that American values of freedom, democracy, optimism, and technological progress were inconsistent with Vietnam's values, culture, agrarian economy, and long history of warfare with France and China, making the Vietnam War effort doomed from the start. The Vietnamese sense of government, history, politics, and war is completely different from the American one. They have had a cultural tradition of ancestor worship and a different belief in what constitutes effective government (the Mandate of Heaven). The US government's failure to acknowledge these differences led to its failure in waging war there against the North Vietnamese and insurgents.

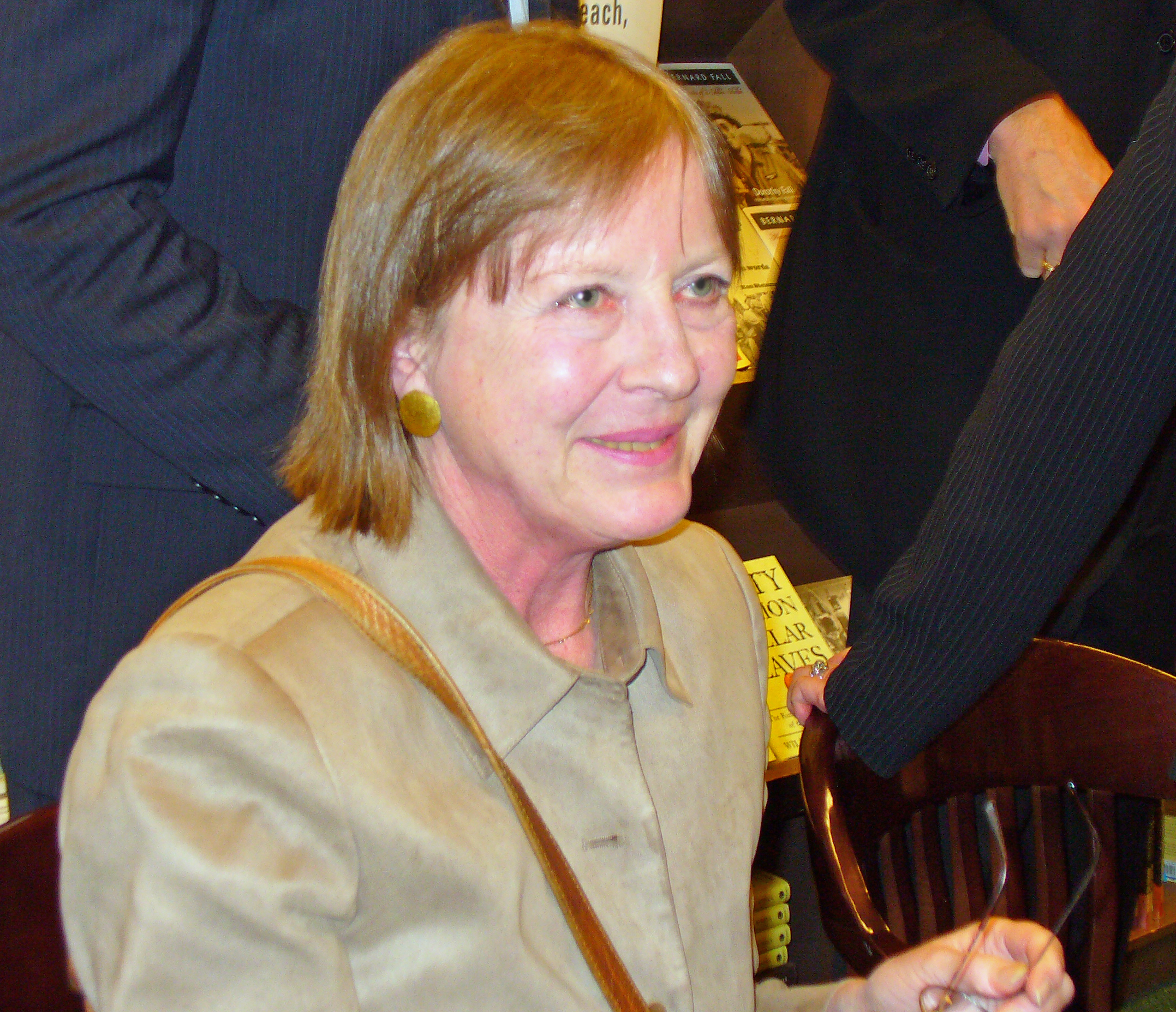
Frances FitzGerald

The book discusses the US government's ignorance of Vietnam's history, especially their determination to rid themselves of foreign invaders. They fought against Chinese domination for 1000 years, despite the latter's vastly superior population and resources. Many Vietnamese considered United States forces to be another wave of foreign invaders.

The book covers the history in depth and reaches the Tet Offensive 90% of the way through the narrative. It explores the Cao Đài monotheist religious sect in Tay Ninh, the corrupt regime of Ngo Dinh Diem, and "Nixon's War".

In her discussion of the Battle of Bong Son, Fitzgerald discusses the futility of the US use of body counts to tally successes:

Furthermore, as the only 'indicator of progress,' it suggested that death and destruction had some absolute value in terms of winning the war. That the enemy might continue to recruit, rearm, and rebuild (often with the help of people enraged by the American destruction) did not seem to enter into the calculations.

== Critical reception ==
The book was highly acclaimed; it was noted by New York Times reviewers as one of the five most important books published in 1972. It was on the New York Times bestseller list for 10 weeks by May 1973. Due to its popularity and significance, it was published in paperback in 1973 by Vintage and is available online at the Internet Archive.

It won several literary awards, including the Pulitzer Prize for General Nonfiction, the National Book Award in Contemporary Affairs, and the Bancroft Prize for history.

Scholar David G. Marr in The Journal of Asian Studies criticized FitzGerald's discussion of Vietnamese history and national character, given that she lacked the language and could not read its literature. He said that she tried to explain a "grand Vietnamese Gestalt" that was in opposition to Western values, but relied on Western thinkers to form her conclusions. But he said she was much more successful in her sections on US involvement, superior to other journalists in analyzing the "Diem regime's fundamental social and political weaknesses" and assessing the National Liberation Front.
