= Clement A. Riley =

American politician (1905-1988)

Massachusetts Registrar of Motor Vehicles
- In office November 30, 1957 – 1963
- Preceded by: Rudolph King
- Succeeded by: James R. Lawton

Personal details
- Born: November 20, 1905
- Died: May 31, 1988 (aged 82) Norwood, Massachusetts
- Party: Democratic
- Education: Boston College

Clement A. Riley (November 20, 1905 – May 31, 1988) was a Massachusetts politician who served as the Massachusetts Registrar of Motor Vehicles from 1957 to 1963.

A nine-year member of the Norwood Board of Selectmen, Riley was appointed to the Civil Service Commission by Governor Paul A. Dever in 1951. In 1954 and 1956, Riley was a candidate for Treasurer and Receiver-General of Massachusetts. He lost in the Democratic primary both times to John Francis Kennedy. In 1957, Foster Furcolo appointed him to replace Rudolph King as Registrar of Motor Vehicles. Riley was a candidate for Governor of Massachusetts in 1962; losing the Democratic nomination to Endicott Peabody.
