= 1940 United States Senate election in Massachusetts =

- November 5, 1940
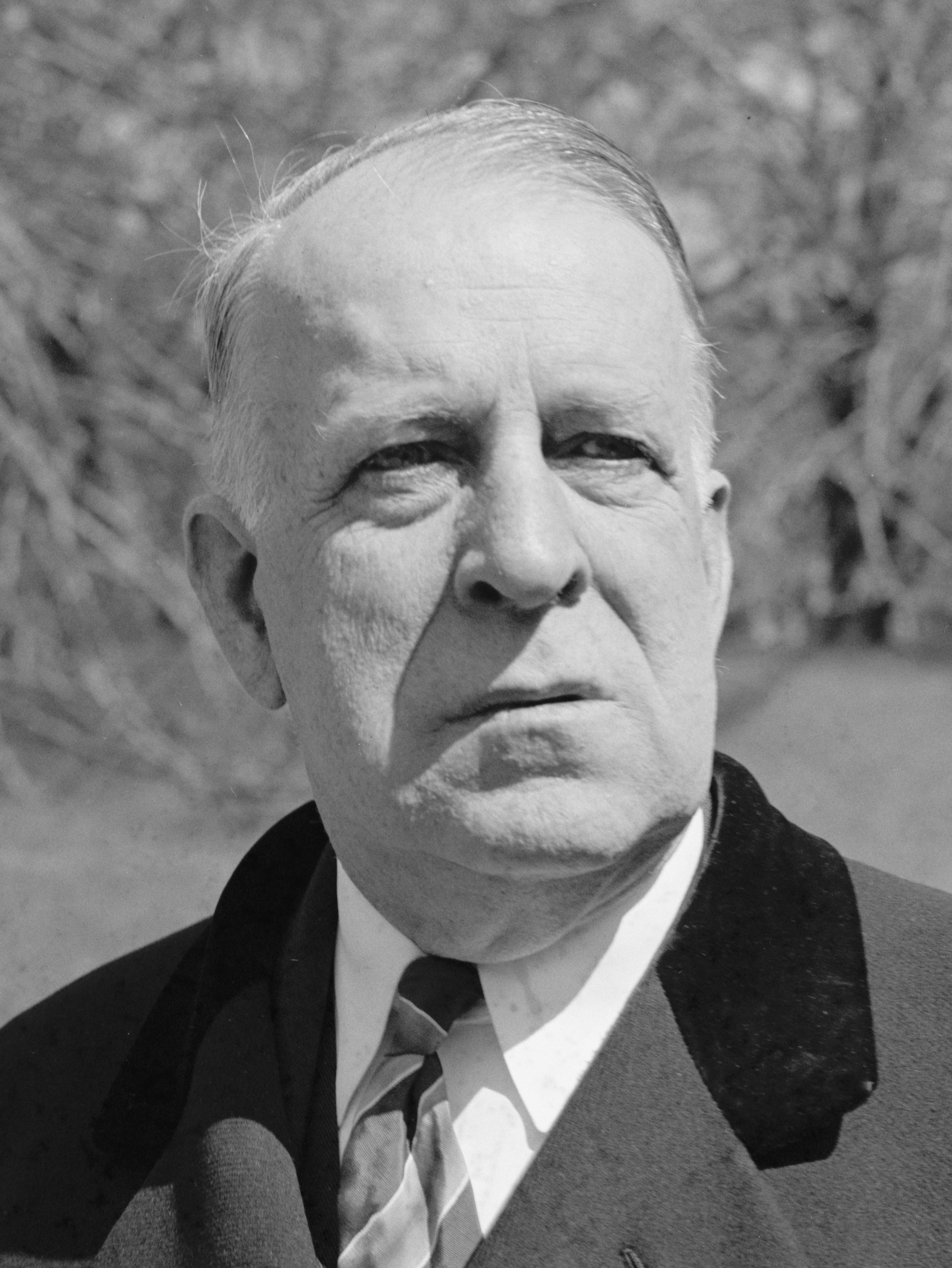

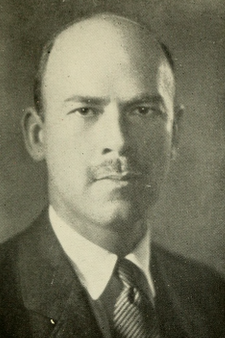
Nominee	David I. Walsh	Henry Parkman Jr.
Party	Democratic	Republican
Popular vote	1,088,838	838,122
Percentage	55.64%	42.38%
- Walsh: 40–50% 50–60% 60–70% 70–80% Parkman: 40–50% 50–60% 60–70% 70–80% 80–90%
Senator before election
David I. Walsh
Democratic
Elected Senator
David I. Walsh
Democratic

The 1940 United States Senate election in Massachusetts was held on November 5, 1940, with Democratic incumbent David I. Walsh defeating his challengers.

== Democratic primary ==
=== Candidates ===
- David I. Walsh, incumbent U.S. Senator since 1926 (also served 1919–25) and former Governor of Massachusetts (1914–16)

=== Results ===
Senator Walsh was unopposed for renomination.

1940 Democratic U.S. Senate primary
Party	Candidate	Votes	%
Democratic	David I. Walsh (incumbent)	286,468	99.96%
Write-in		101	0.04%
Total votes		286,569	100.00%
None	Blank votes	103,981	–
Turnout		390,550	

== Republican primary ==
=== Candidates ===
- Henry Parkman Jr., Corporation Counsel for the City of Boston, former state senator and Boston City Councilman

=== Results ===
Parkman was unopposed for the Republican nomination.

1940 Republican U.S. Senate primary
Party	Candidate	Votes	%
Republican	Henry Parkman Jr.	274,628	99.99%
Write-in		30	0.01%
Total votes		274,658	100.00%
None	Blank votes	72,707	–
Turnout		347,365	

== General election ==
=== Candidates ===
- Philip Frankfeld (Communist)
- Horace I. Hillis, perennial candidate (Socialist Labor)
- George Lyman Paine, Episcopal priest and son of philanthropist Robert Treat Paine (Socialist)
- Henry Parkman Jr., Corporation Counsel for the City of Boston, former state senator and Boston City Councilman (Republican)
- George L. Thompson, candidate for governor in 1938 (Prohibition)
- David I. Walsh, incumbent U.S. Senator since 1926 (also served 1919–25) and former governor of Massachusetts (1914–16) (Democratic)

=== Results ===
194 U.S. Senate election in Massachusetts
Party	Candidate	Votes	%	±%
Democratic	David I. Walsh (incumbent)	1,088,838	55.64%	▼3.75
Republican	Henry Parkman Jr.	838,122	42.38%	▲5.00
Prohibition	George L. Thompson	9,632	0.49%	▼0.23
Communist	Philip Frankfeld	9,465	0.48%	▲0.08
Socialist	George Lyman Paine	6,876	0.35%	▼1.19
Socialist Labor	Horace I. Hillis	4,133	0.21%	▼0.36
None	Blank votes	105,192	—	—
Total votes		2,062,281	100.00%	
