= Mary E. Peabody =

Civil rights activist (1891–1981)

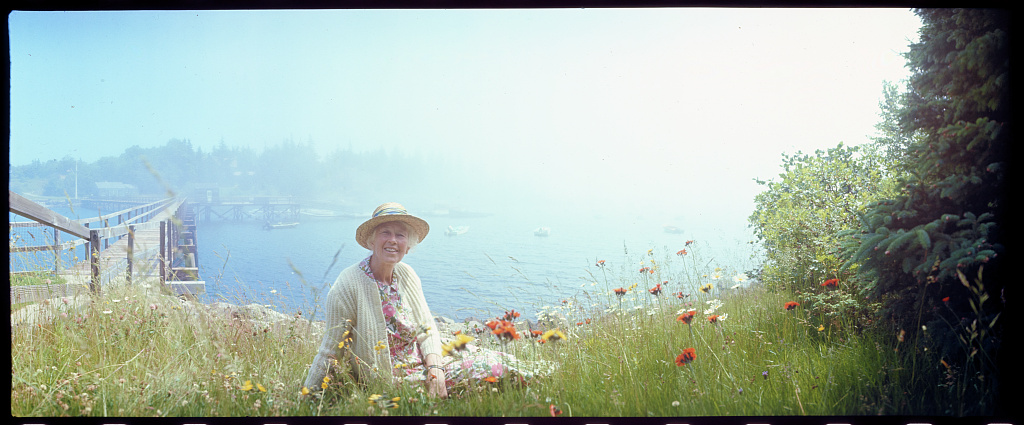
Peabody in 1953

Mary Elizabeth Peabody (née Mary Elizabeth Parkman; July 24, 1891—February 6, 1981) was an American civil-rights and anti-war activist in the 1960s. She is best known for her participation in a sit-in protest in St. Augustine, Florida, which was orchestrated by prominent members of the Southern Christian Leadership Conference. As an elderly white woman, Peabody's role in the protest was to draw attention to the protest and the civil rights movement as a whole.

== Personal life ==
Mary Peabody (née Parkman) was born in the Back Bay neighborhood of Boston, Massachusetts, on July 24, 1891. She was the daughter of Henry Parkman, a businessman, and Frances Parker Parkman, both of whom came from affluent families. In her early years she attended Miss Porter's School in Farmington, Connecticut. She met Rev. Malcolm E. Peabody, who was then serving as a missionary in the Philippines, on a cruise following her graduation. They were married in 1916.

The couple had five children. Their first child was Endicott Peabody, who later become the Governor of Massachusetts, and the second was Marietta Tree, who served as the United States delegate to the United Nations Trusteeship Council in 1964 and 1965. Peabody's granddaughter is the Pulitzer Prize-winning author, Frances FitzGerald.

Malcolm E. Peabody died in 1974. Since then, Mary Peabody had lived in Cambridge and in Northeast Harbor, Maine.

== Career ==
In March 1964, Peabody went to St. Augustine, Florida, to participate in civil rights demonstrations. Peabody was an activist prior to this, but her time in St. Augustine is what put her into the national spotlight. She knew before going that she would be arrested, and that the organizers were hoping her arrest would gain more attention from the media than the other protestors' had. Peabody spent two nights in the local jail and the photo of her in the jail cell, with her pearls, nicely done hair and sophisticated clothing was on almost every newspaper in the country within the week. This brought national attention to the civil rights issues occurring in St. Augustine. One clause in the Civil Rights Act of 1964 that is owed almost entirely to the activists in St. Augustine, including Peabody, was the outlawing of job discrimination against women as well as against black Americans. In 2013, she received the 'Dr. Robert B. Hayling Award of Valor' in honor of what she did in 1964. She was also a member of Alpha Kappa Alpha sorority.

== Advocacy ==
During the 1960s, major civil rights protests were being organized by some of the most famous activists in history, namely Dr. Martin Luther King Jr. In the spring of 1964, Peabody and her husband, Rev. Malcolm Peabody, attended church in Brookline - a church that she notes was very interested in civil rights and had many Black speakers come to preach. There, she was approached by Canon James Breedon, who was asking for volunteers to protest in St. Augustine, Florida. Her husband, busy with religious duties for Easter weekend, said he could not attend; however, Mary asked if any women were needed in attendance. Breedon said they would be glad to have anyone willing to join, so she joined the group of volunteers.

On a Sunday of the last week of March, Mary and the others traveled to St. Augustine, Florida, and were greeted upon arrival by Hosea Williams of the Southern Christian Leadership Conference (S.C.L.C.) and Dr. Martin Luther King Jr.'s deputy. She, along with others, faced many challenges during their time in Florida, including refusal of service in restaurants and churches. During her trip to Florida, Mary and other protesters attempted to integrate several restaurants, all of which she was quickly removed from. She then tried to attend an Easter service at the Trinity Episcopal Church, where she was blocked from entering as church authorities heard rumors that 'radicals' wanted to attend. Mary decided it was time to make a grander statement, and follow the lead of a fellow volunteer, Esther Burgess, a Black woman. Mary decided to attempt to be arrested. She and others marched back to the motel dining room at the Ponce de Leon Motor Lodge - a site that she was previously removed from - and was arrested and charged with trespassing.

Her advocacy continued beyond arrest. During the hearing process, United States district court Judge Bryan Simpson delayed the ruling, which prompted Peabody to decide on staying a second night in jail, despite her bail being set. Her son, Rev. George Peabody, announced the decision after flying to St. Augustine to check on his mother.

Peabody acknowledged her position as an elderly, white advocate for civil rights. She knew she did not suffer the same treatment and could draw attention to the issue without being harmed. Her unique position enabled her to be a powerful advocate for civil rights.

== St. Augustine sit-in ==
Peabody's most notable news appearance occurred during a sit-in located in St. Augustine, Florida, where she was arrested and photographed behind bars. Her interactions with the press began after volunteering to go to the St. Augustine sit-in. After getting the attention of several newspapers, Peabody recalled in her personal accounts of the journey that papers were immediately jumping on the opportunity to interview the volunteers. In her personal recount, she mentions a woman named Phyllis Ryan, who helped the group of volunteers navigate the public attention and was readily available to those who wanted to be interviewed to ask for money to support the cause.

One afternoon, Peabody and the other volunteers were arrested for returning to a restaurant they had been removed from, and refusing to move until they received service. On March 31, 1964, Peabody was arrested and taken to St. Johns County Jail. Many photographs were taken due to the sensationalism of a prominent white elderly woman being arrested for supporting the civil rights movement. The arrest was major news, grasping national attention and placing pressure on congress to pass a civil rights act. Headlines all over America discussed the arrest and Peabody's contribution as a white individual to the very controversial (at the time) civil rights movement. Her role as the 72-year-old mother of then Governor Endicott Peabody--and cousin of Eleanor Roosevelt (her father-in-law had officiated at the marriage of Franklin and Eleanor Roosevelt in 1905)--made her arrest more newsworthy.

Images of the arrest and Peabody behind bars revived media attention throughout the nation. It was featured on the front page of the New York Times on April Fool's Day, 1964. The newfound media attention sparked by the St. Augustine's protest illuminated future protests, making the civil rights movement a staple in the media. Peabody was later the inspiration for a cartoon drawing, published in the media, titled "Civil Rights Battler." The drawing shows Peabody sitting in a chair in a jail cell.

== Death ==
Peabody died on February 6, 1981, of heart failure in Cambridge Hospital in Cambridge, Massachusetts.
