= Frances FitzGerald (journalist) =

American journalist and historian

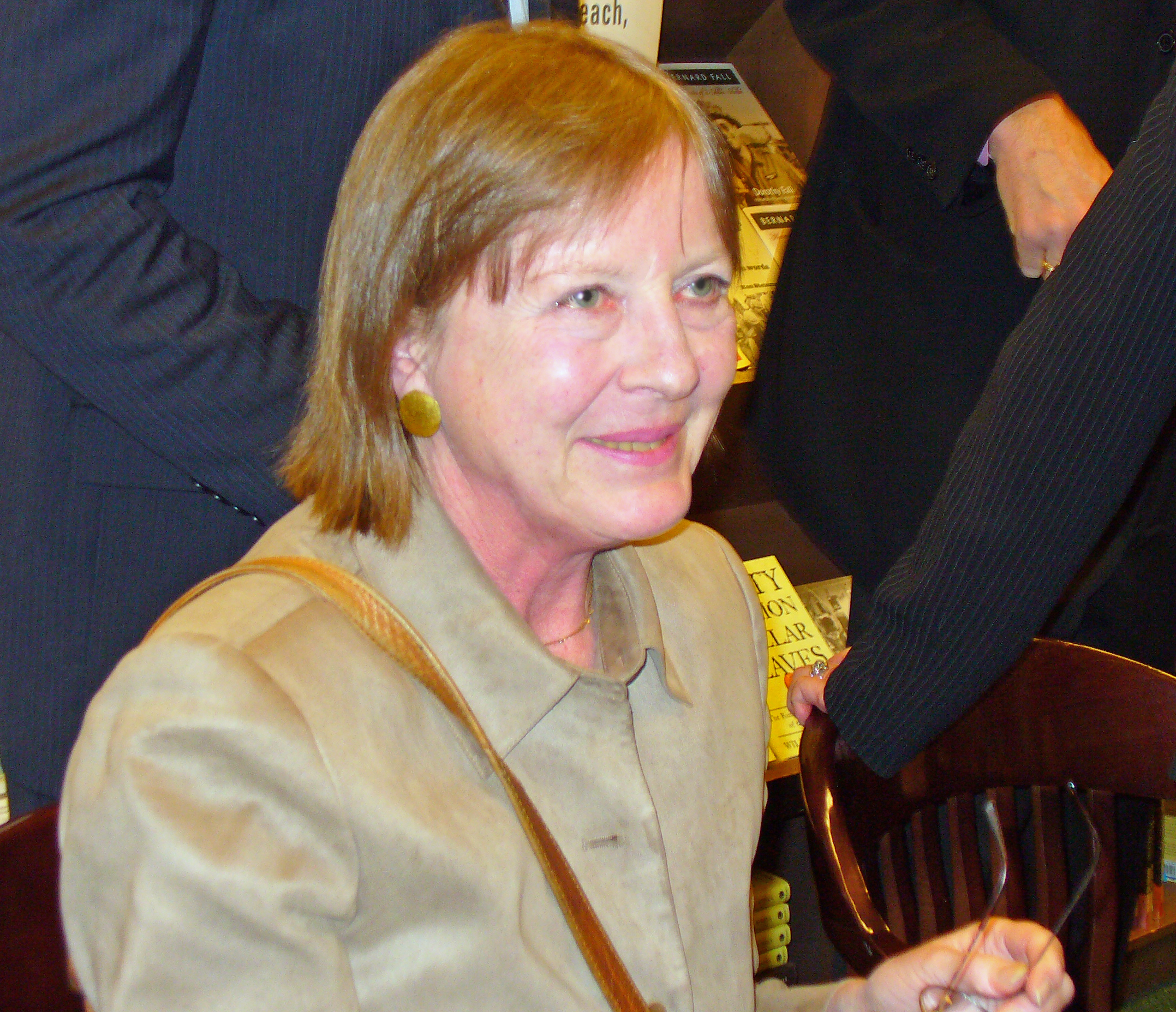
- Born: October 21, 1940 (age 85); New York City, U.S.
- Education: Radcliffe College (BA)
- Occupations: Journalist, historian

Frances FitzGerald (born October 21, 1940) is an American journalist and historian, who is primarily known for Fire in the Lake: The Vietnamese and the Americans in Vietnam (1972), an account of the Vietnam War. It was a bestseller that won the Pulitzer Prize, Bancroft Prize, and National Book Award.

== Early life and education ==
Frances FitzGerald was born in New York City, the only daughter of Desmond FitzGerald, an attorney on Wall Street, and socialite Marietta Peabody. Her grandmother was a prominent activist in the civil rights movement of the 1960s, and from an early age, FitzGerald was introduced to a wide range of political figures. Her parents divorced shortly after World War II. From 1950 to his death in 1967, her father was an intelligence officer with the Central Intelligence Agency, becoming a deputy director. Her mother subsequently remarried Ronald Tree, a British journalist, investor and Conservative MP, from that marriage Fitzgerald has a half-sister: British model Penelope Tree.

As a teenager, FitzGerald wrote voluminous letters to Governor Adlai Stevenson of Illinois, her mother's lover, expressing her opinion on many subjects, a reflection of her deep interest in world affairs. She graduated from Foxcroft School in Middleburg, Virginia, and magna cum laude from Radcliffe College, then a women's college associated with Harvard University.

== Career ==
External videos
- Booknotes interview with FitzGerald and Peter Kann on Reporting Vietnam, January 31, 1999, C-SPAN

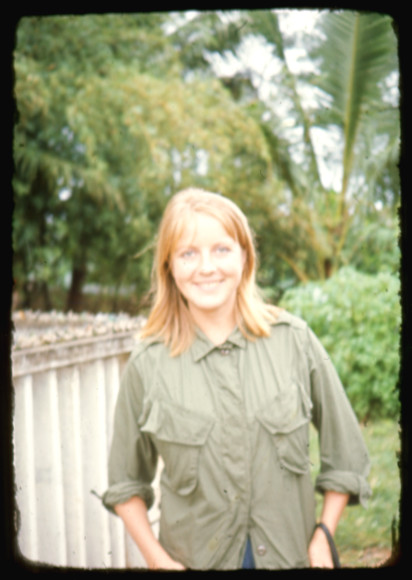
FitzGerald in South Vietnam in 1966

FitzGerald became a journalist, initially writing for the New York Herald Tribune magazine. She went to South Vietnam in January 1966. She met Washington Post journalist Ward Just at a party soon after arriving in Saigon and began a relationship with him that continued until she left South Vietnam in November 1966. She formed a close connection with Daniel Ellsberg who was working as an intelligence officer at the U.S. Embassy. Unlike many of the male journalists, she did not report on the latest combat operations, but rather focused on the effects of the war on South Vietnamese politics and society. Her first article titled "The Hopeful Americans & the Weightless Mr. Ky" was published in the Village Voice on 21 April 1966. She investigated the effects of Operation Masher on South Vietnamese civilians and followed the Buddhist Uprising. She repeatedly visited the village of Duc Lap, interviewing villagers to write "Life and Death of a Vietnamese Village" which appeared in The New York Times Magazine on 4 September 1966. Her final story was "Behind the Facade: the Tragedy of Saigon" describing the conditions of refugees who had sought safety in the city and were overwhelming its inadequate infrastructure and funding.

On her return to New York she attended Truman Capote's Black and White Ball with her mother, stepfather and half-sister Penelope Tree on 28 November 1966, which launched Tree's modelling career.

In late June 1967 she met Just in Paris and the two then spent July and August writing at Glin Castle owned by her distant relative Desmond John Villiers FitzGerald, Knight of Glin. She flew back to Washington in late July to attend her father's funeral and then returned to Glin. In October Just sent her a birthday letter advising that he had got married. Just's book, To What End, written at Glin, did not mention FitzGerald by name.

In October 1967 she was introduced to Paul Mus who was visiting professor at Princeton University. Mus' book Sociologie d'une Guerre had informed her writing on Vietnam. Mus became a mentor to her until his death in 1969. In 1968 she signed a contract with the Atlantic Monthly Press for a book about the Americans and Vietnam.

In late 1969 she was awarded residency at the MacDowell Colony and began a relationship with fellow resident writer Alan Lelchuk. At the end of the residency she lived with Lelchuk in Cambridge, Massachusetts, where he worked as an assistant professor at Brandeis University.

Following Mus' death, John McAlister and Richard H. Solomon acted as advisers on FitzGerald's book. In January 1970 she met with Henry Kissinger to discuss Richard Nixon's Vietnam policy. Later in 1970 she was visited by Daniel Ellsberg who discussed his misgivings about the war. In June 1971 she submitted the completed manuscript to her publishers.

She returned to Saigon in September 1971 and while there began a relationship with Kevin Buckley, the Saigon bureau chief for Newsweek.

Her book Fire in the Lake: The Vietnamese and the Americans in Vietnam was serialised in five parts in The New Yorker in its newly-created "Annals of War" series starting in July 1972 earning her a Special Front Page Award. Fire in the Lake was met with great acclaim when it was published in August 1972 and won the 1973 Pulitzer Prize for General Nonfiction, the Bancroft Prize for history, and the U.S. National Book Award in Contemporary Affairs. The book cautioned that the United States did not understand the history and culture of Vietnam and it warned about American involvement there.

She returned to South Vietnam in early 1974 one year after the signing of the Paris Peace Accords and twice crossed over into Vietcong controlled territory, filing stories for The New York Times and the Atlantic Monthly. She travelled to Hanoi in late 1974 and stayed in North Vietnam into early January 1975, writing a 23-page article for the New Yorker.

FitzGerald has continued to write about history and culture: her published books include America Revised (1979), a highly critical review of history textbooks published in the United States; Cities on a Hill (1987), an analysis of various non-standard American religious groups; Way Out There in the Blue: Reagan, Star Wars and the End of the Cold War (2000), a Pulitzer Prize finalist; and Vietnam: Spirits of the Earth (2002).

In 1987, FitzGerald received the Golden Plate Award of the American Academy of Achievement presented by Awards Council member Robert K. Massie.

Her book Cities on a Hill includes a chapter on Rajneeshpuram, whose rise and fall in the 1980s in Oregon is the subject of the documentary Wild Wild Country.

External media

Audio
- NPR interview with FitzGerald on The Evangelicals, May 2, 2017

Video
- Presentation by FitzGerald on The Evangelicals, April 12, 2017, C-SPAN

In 2007, she writes the informative Introduction to the international bestseller Last night I dreamed of peace: The Diary of Dang Thuy Tram, published by Harmony Books, New York, in September 2007.

Her book, The Evangelicals: The Struggle to Shape America, published in 2017, is a history of the evangelical movement, its central figures, and its long-reaching influence upon American history, politics, and culture. The Evangelicals was shortlisted for the 2017 National Book Award for nonfiction.

FitzGerald has also written numerous articles, which have been published in The New Yorker, the New York Review of Books, The New York Times Magazine, Esquire, Architectural Digest, and Rolling Stone. Her "Rewriting American history" was published in The Norton Reader. She serves on the editorial boards of The Nation and Foreign Policy magazines. She also serves as vice-president of International PEN.

== Personal life ==
FitzGerald is married to James P. Sterba, a former writer for The Wall Street Journal. They live in New York City and Maine. Sterba featured the latter in his 2003 book Frankie's Place: A Love Story.

== Books ==
- FitzGerald, F. (1972), Fire in the Lake: The Vietnamese and the Americans in Vietnam
- FitzGerald, F. (1979), America Revised
- FitzGerald, F. (1986), Cities on a Hill: A Journey through Contemporary American Cultures
- FitzGerald, F. (2000), Way Out There in the Blue: Reagan, Star wars and the End of the Cold War
- FitzGerald, F. (2001), Vietnam: Spirits of the Earth
- FitzGerald, F. (2017), The Evangelicals: The Struggle to Shape America
