= Malcolm E. Peabody =

American bishop

The Right Reverend Malcolm E. Peabody
- Bishop of Central New York
- Church: Episcopal Church
- Diocese: Central New York
- In office: 1942–1960
- Predecessor: Edward H. Coley
- Successor: Walter M. Higley
- Previous post: Coadjutor Bishop of Central New York (1938-1942)

Orders
- Ordination: May 3, 1917 by William Lawrence
- Consecration: September 29, 1938 by Henry St. George Tucker

Personal details
- Born: Malcolm Endicott Peabody; June 12, 1888 Danvers, Massachusetts
- Died: June 20, 1974 (aged 86) Boston, Massachusetts
- Buried: Mount Auburn Cemetery
- Denomination: Anglican
- Parents: Endicott Peabody
- Spouse: Mary Elizabeth Parkman
- Children: 5, including Marietta Peabody Tree and Endicott Peabody

Malcolm Endicott Peabody (June 12, 1888 – June 20, 1974) was bishop of the Episcopal Diocese of Central New York from 1942 to 1960.

== Biography ==
Peabody was born on June 12, 1888, in Danvers, Massachusetts, the son of Endicott and Fannie Peabody. His first paternal American ancestor was Francis Peabody, who came from England in 1635 and settled in New England. Peabody graduated from Harvard College in 1911. Between 1911 and 1913 he served as headmaster of the Baguio School for American Boys in the Philippines. Later he studied at Trinity College, Cambridge in England and then the Episcopal Theological School in Cambridge, Massachusetts from where he graduated with a Bachelor of Divinity in 1916. He was made deacon that same year and ordained priest in 1917. During World War I, he served as a Red Cross chaplain with the American Expeditionary Forces and as an Army chaplain with the 102d Field Artillery.

In 1921 he became rector of Grace Church in Lawrence, Massachusetts, while in 1925 he transferred to Chestnut Hill, Pennsylvania, to become rector of St Paul's Church where he remained until 1938. In 1938 he was elected Coadjutor Bishop of Central New York and was consecrated on September 29 with Presiding Bishop Henry St. George Tucker as principal consecrator. Upon the retirement of Bishop Coley on July 1, 1942, Peabody succeeded as diocesan bishop. He was formally installed as the fifth Bishop of Central New York on September 29, 1942, in St Paul's Church in Syracuse, New York. Peabody retired in 1960.

== Personal life ==
Peabody married Mary Parkman, and they had five children, including Endicott Peabody (1920 – 1997), governor of Massachusetts, and Marietta Peabody Tree (1917 – 1991).
