= Karole Vail =

American museum director and writer

Karole P. B. Vail
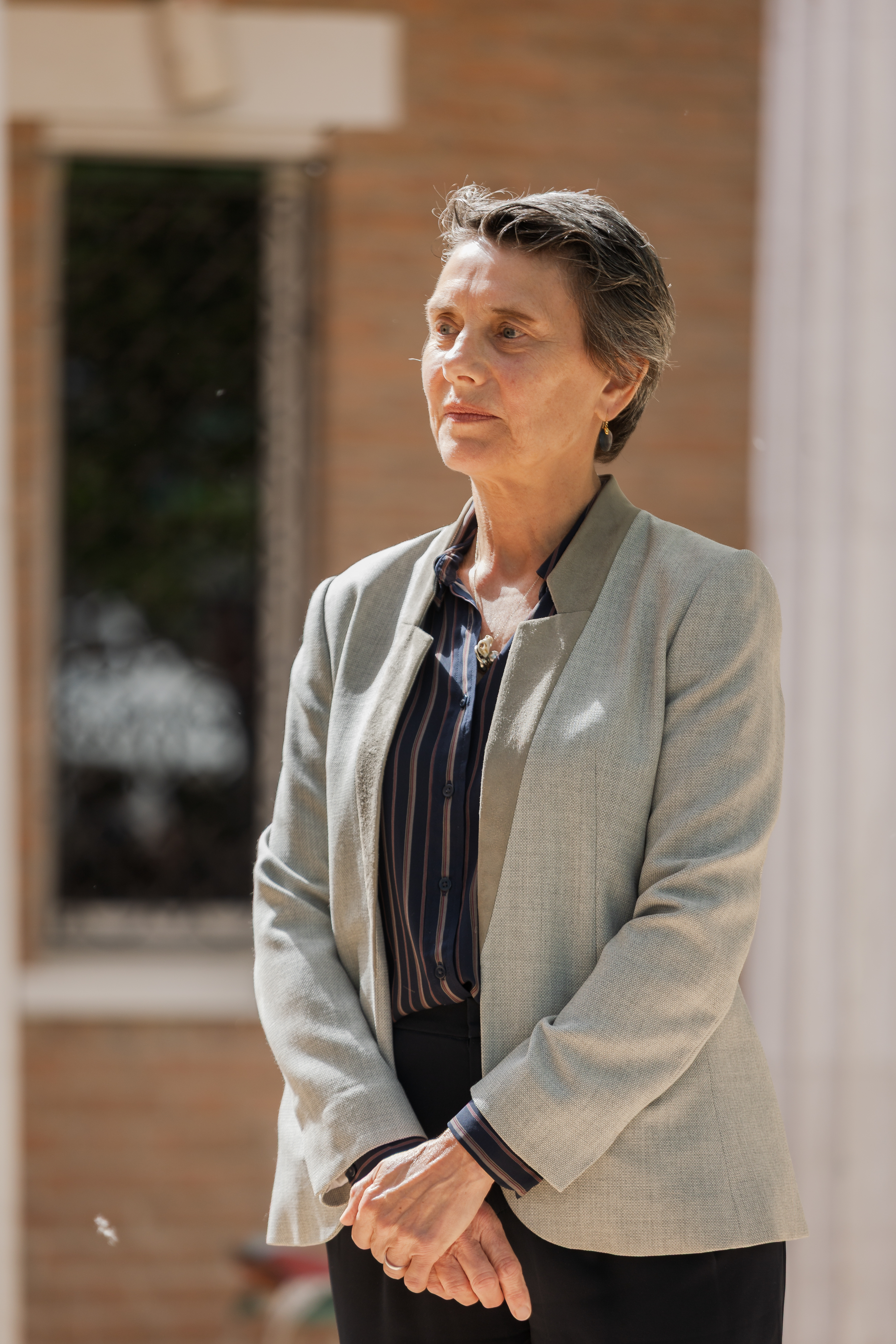
- Vail at the Venice Biennale, 2025
- Born: 1959 (age 66–67)
- Occupations: museum director, curator and writer

Karole P. B. Vail (born 1959) is an American museum director, curator and writer. Since 2017, she has been the director of the Peggy Guggenheim Collection in Venice and Solomon R. Guggenheim Foundation Director for Italy. Prior to this appointment, she worked on the curatorial staff at the Solomon R. Guggenheim Museum in New York for 20 years.

== Early life and education ==
Vail is the younger daughter of Michael Cedric Sindbad Vail (1923–1986) and Margaret "Peggy" Angela Vail (née Yeomans; d. 1988), who married in 1957. Vail grew up in Europe and spent 12 years in Florence, Italy; she first became familiar with the Peggy Guggenheim Collection as a child. She received her Bachelor of Arts degree from Durham University in England and a Diploma in Art History from the New Academy for Art Studies in London.

== Career ==
Early in her career, Vail was an archivist and researcher at the arts publishing house Centro Di in Florence and worked as an assistant curator on independent projects. She is a co-founder and co-director of Non-Objectif Sud, a not-for-profit artist residency and exhibition program in the south of France.

She joined the Solomon R. Guggenheim Museum in New York as a curator in 1997. There she curated or co-curated such exhibitions as Peggy Guggenheim: A Centennial Celebration (1998); the museum's 50th anniversary exhibition Art of Tomorrow: Hilla Rebay and Solomon R. Guggenheim, which examined the collaborative relationship between the two founders of the museum (2005–06); From Berlin to New York: Karl Nierendorf and the Guggenheim (2008); and a László Moholy-Nagy retrospective, Moholy-Nagy: Future Present (2016). Before leaving New York, Vail was preparing an Alberto Giacometti retrospective for the Guggenheim Museum in New York, which was exhibited in 2018.

Since 2017, she has been the director of the Peggy Guggenheim Collection in Venice and Solomon R. Guggenheim Foundation Director for Italy. Prior to this appointment, she worked on the curatorial staff at the Solomon R. Guggenheim Museum in New York for 20 years. She curated the exhibition (and edited the accompanying catalogue) about her grandmother, Peggy Guggenheim, The Last Dogaressa, on view at the Collection in late 2019.

Vail's publications include Peggy Guggenheim: A Celebration (1998); The Museum of Non-Objective Painting: Hilla Rebay and the Origins of the Solomon R. Guggenheim Museum (2009); Moholy-Nagy: Future Present, which received an Honorable Mention in the 2017 Awards for Excellence of the Association of Art Museum Curators; and Art of Tomorrow: Hilla Rebay and Solomon R. Guggenheim. She also organized exhibitions and wrote catalogue entries about Wassily Kandinsky, Nesuhi Ertegun, Daniel Filipacchi, Robert Mapplethorpe, Lucio Fontana, Richard Pousette-Dart, Gabriele Münter, Pablo Picasso and Monir Shahroudy Farmanfarmaian, among others.

== Personal life and family ==
Vail is a member of the Guggenheim family. Her great-grandfather was Benjamin Guggenheim, who died in the sinking of the Titanic, and her paternal grandparents were Peggy Guggenheim and Laurence Vail, a poet and sculptor whose works are represented in the Peggy Guggenheim Collection. Her great-granduncle was Solomon R. Guggenheim.
