= Palazzo Corner della Ca' Grande =

Palace in Venice, Italy

Coordinates: 45°25′54″N 12°19′54″E

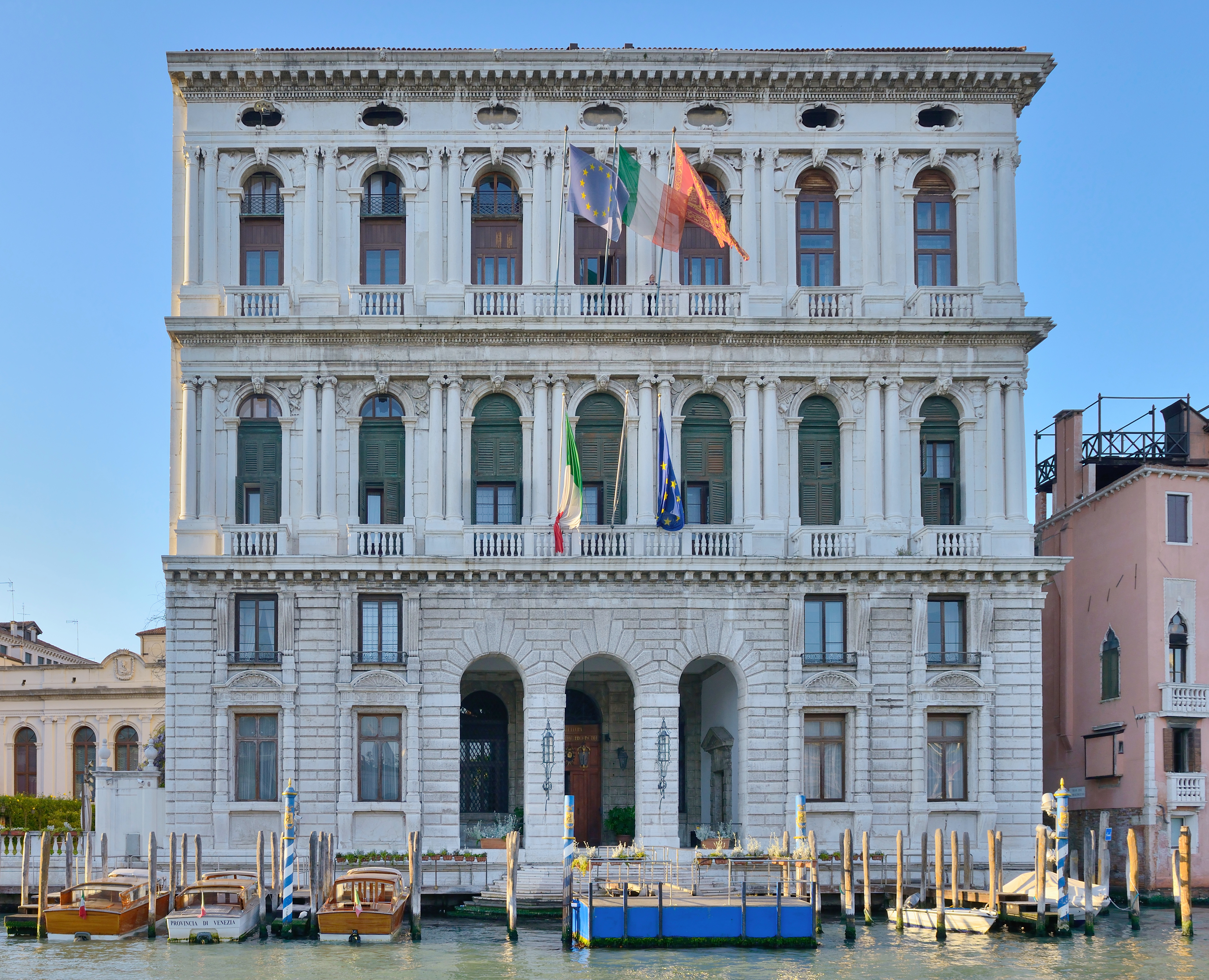
Palazzo Corner.

Palazzo Corner della Ca' Granda, also called Ca' Corner della Ca' Granda or simply Palazzo Corner or Palazzo Cornaro, is a Renaissance-style palace located between the Casina delle Rose and the Rio di San Maurizio (Venice), across the Grand Canal from the Palazzo Venier dei Leoni (Peggy Guggenheim Collection), in the city of Venice, Italy. It is the current seat of the province of Venice and of the city's prefect.

== History ==
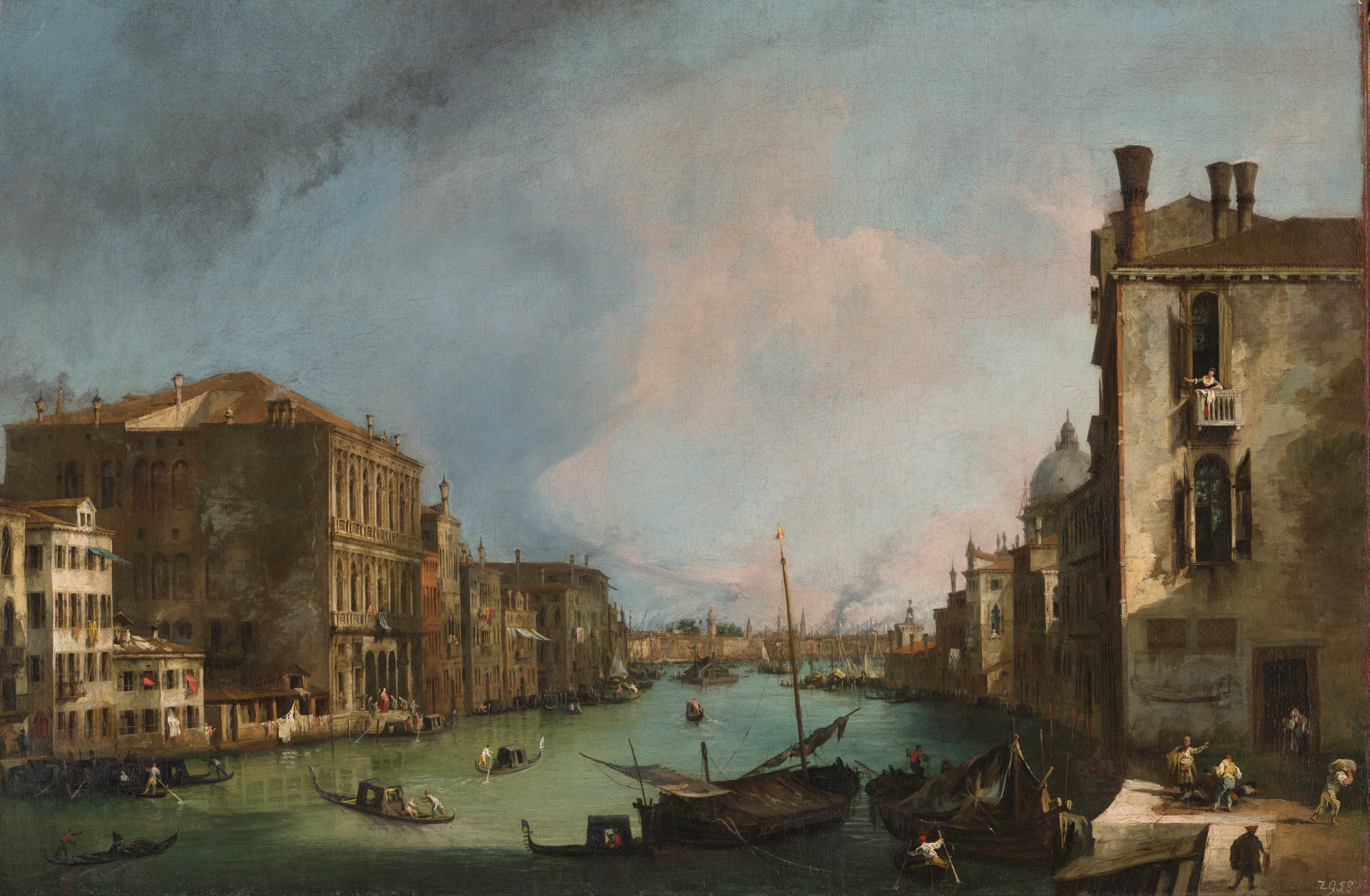
The Grand Canal in Venice with the Palazzo Corner, Canaletto

The palace was designed by Jacopo Sansovino, after a fire that in 1532 had destroyed the previous residence of the Corner family. It was one of the first commissions received by the architect in Venice. The previous residence had been purchased by Giorgio Cornaro, brother of Caterina Cornaro from the Malombra family.

In 1817, after another fire, Andrea Corner sold the palace to the Austrian Empire, which installed here the Provincial Delegation and, later, the Imperial Lieutnancy. Once the Veneto was annexed to Italy in 1866, the palace was chosen as the seat of both the province of Venice and of its prefect.

== Description ==
The palace is located not far from St. Mark's Square. It has a façade divided into two horizontal orders. The lower part has a rustication decoration, while the upper floors feature a series of large arcades.

In the centre, at the Canal Grande level, is a portico with three arcades, sided by two couples of square windows.

== See also ==
- Palazzo Corner Spinelli
- Palazzo Corner Valmarana

== Sources ==
- Brusegan, M. (2005). La grande guida dei monumenti di Venezia. Rome: Newton Compton. ISBN 88-541-0475-2.
