= Mariët Westermann =

Dutch art historian and museum director (born 1962)

- Born: 1962 (age 63–64); Netherlands
- Education: Williams College; New York University Institute of Fine Arts
- Occupations: Art historian, museum director and academic administrator
- Employer: Solomon R. Guggenheim Foundation
- Title: Director and chief executive officer

Mariët Westermann (born 1962) is a Dutch-born art historian specialising in seventeenth-century Dutch art and a museum director and administrator. Since June 2024, she has served as director and chief executive officer of the Solomon R. Guggenheim Museum and Foundation. She is the first woman to lead the international museum organisation.

== Early life and education ==
Westermann grew up in the Netherlands and graduated magna cum laude from Williams College in the U.S. 1984. She received her master's degree and doctorate in art history from New York University's Institute of Fine Arts, which examined the genre paintings of Jan Steen.

== Academic and administrative career ==
She taught at Rutgers University in New Jersey and later became associate director for research and academic programmes at the Clark Art Institute in Massachusetts. She was director of NYU's Institute of Fine Arts in New York from 2002 and served as the founding provost of New York University Abu Dhabi from 2007 to 2010.

Westermann joined the Andrew W. Mellon Foundation in New York City in 2010, eventually serving as executive vice president for programmes and research. She returned to NYU Abu Dhabi as vice chancellor and chief executive from 2019 to 2024.

== Guggenheim Foundation ==
Westermann's appointment to the Guggenheim as its first female director was announced in November 2023, an unusual selection also because her career had followed an unconventional museum-directorial path.

As director and CEO, she oversees the Foundation, its New York museum and the Peggy Guggenheim Collection in Venice, while working with the Guggenheim Museum Bilbao and providing collaborative leadership for the Guggenheim Abu Dhabi project.

In October 2025, Westermann joined directors of other international museums in a public declaration published by Le Monde supporting the institutional independence and public mission of the Louvre.

== Scholarship ==
Westermann's publications include:

- A Worldly Art: The Dutch Republic, 1585–1718 (1996).
- The Amusements of Jan Steen: Comic Painting in the Seventeenth Century (1997).
- Rembrandt: Art and Ideas (2000).
- Art and Home: Dutch Interiors in the Age of Rembrandt (2001), an exhibition catalogue edited by Westermann. Westermann served as lead curator of the associated exhibition, which was presented at the Newark Museum from 30 September 2001 to 20 January 2002 and at the Denver Art Museum from 2 March to 26 May 2002.
- “After Iconography and Iconoclasm: Current Research in Netherlandish Art, 1566–1700” (2002), published in The Art Bulletin.
