= Solomon R. Guggenheim Foundation =

American non-profit museum operator

- Formation: 1937
- Type: Nonprofit organization
- Headquarters: New York City, United States
- Director: Mariët Westermann
- Revenue: $89,192,827 (2015)
- Website: www.guggenheim.org

The Solomon R. Guggenheim Foundation is a nonprofit organization founded in 1937 by philanthropist Solomon R. Guggenheim and his long-time art advisor, artist Hilla von Rebay. The foundation is a leading institution for the collection, preservation, and research of modern and contemporary art and operates several museums around the world. The first museum established by the foundation was The Museum of Non-Objective Painting, in New York City. This became the Solomon R. Guggenheim Museum in 1952, and the foundation moved the collection into its first permanent museum building, in New York City, in 1959. The foundation next opened the Peggy Guggenheim Collection in Venice, Italy, in 1980. Its international network of museums expanded in 1997 to include the Guggenheim Museum Bilbao in Bilbao, Spain, and it expects to open a new museum, Guggenheim Abu Dhabi, in the United Arab Emirates after its construction is completed.

The mission of the foundation is "to promote the understanding and appreciation of art, architecture, and other manifestations of visual culture, primarily of the modern and contemporary periods, and to collect, conserve, and study" modern and contemporary art. The Foundation seeks, in its constituent museums, to unite distinguished architecture and artworks. The foundation's first permanent museum, the Solomon R. Guggenheim Museum, is housed in a modern spiral building designed by Frank Lloyd Wright, and the Guggenheim Bilbao was designed by Frank Gehry. Both of these innovative designs received wide press and critical attention. The Peggy Guggenheim Collection is housed in an 18th-century Italian palace, the Palazzo Venier dei Leoni, on the Grand Canal.

The permanent collection of the foundation is based primarily on nine private collections: Solomon R. Guggenheim's collection of non-objective paintings; Karl Nierendorf's collection of German expressionism and early abstract expressionism; Katherine S. Dreier's gift of paintings and sculptures; Peggy Guggenheim's collection, concentrating on abstraction and surrealism; Justin K. and Hilde Thannhauser's collection of Impressionist, Post-Impressionist, and early modern masterpieces; part of Hilla von Rebay's collection; Giuseppe Panza's holdings of American minimalist, post-minimalist, environmental and conceptual art of the 1960s and 1970s; a collection of photographs and mixed media from the Robert Mapplethorpe Foundation; and the Bohen Foundation's collection of film, video, photography and new media. The foundation's collections have expanded greatly through eight decades and include every major movement of 20th- and 21st-century art. Its directors and curators have attempted to form a single collection that is not encyclopedic, but rather based on their unique visions. The collection has grown in scope to include new media and performance art, and the foundation has entered into collaborations with YouTube and BMW.

== History ==
=== Hilla Rebay and early years ===
Solomon R. Guggenheim, a member of a wealthy mining family, began collecting works of the old masters in the 1890s. He retired from his business in 1919 to devote more time to art collecting. In 1926, at age 66, he met artist Hilla von Rebay, who was commissioned by Guggenheim's wife, Irene Rothschild, to paint his portrait. Rebay introduced him to European avant-garde art, in particular abstract art that she felt had a spiritual and utopian aspect (non-objective art). Guggenheim completely changed his collecting strategy. In 1930, the two visited Wassily Kandinsky's studio in Dessau, Germany, and Guggenheim began to purchase Kandinsky's work. The same year, Guggenheim began to display the collection to the public at his apartment in the Plaza Hotel in New York City. Guggenheim's purchases continued with the works of Rudolf Bauer, Fernand Léger, Robert Delaunay, and great artists who were not of the non-objective school, such as Marc Chagall, Jean Metzinger, Albert Gleizes, Pablo Picasso and László Moholy-Nagy. Pieces from the collection were first shown outside New York City in 1936, when the Gibbes Museum of Art in Charleston, South Carolina, displayed 128 of the collection's paintings.

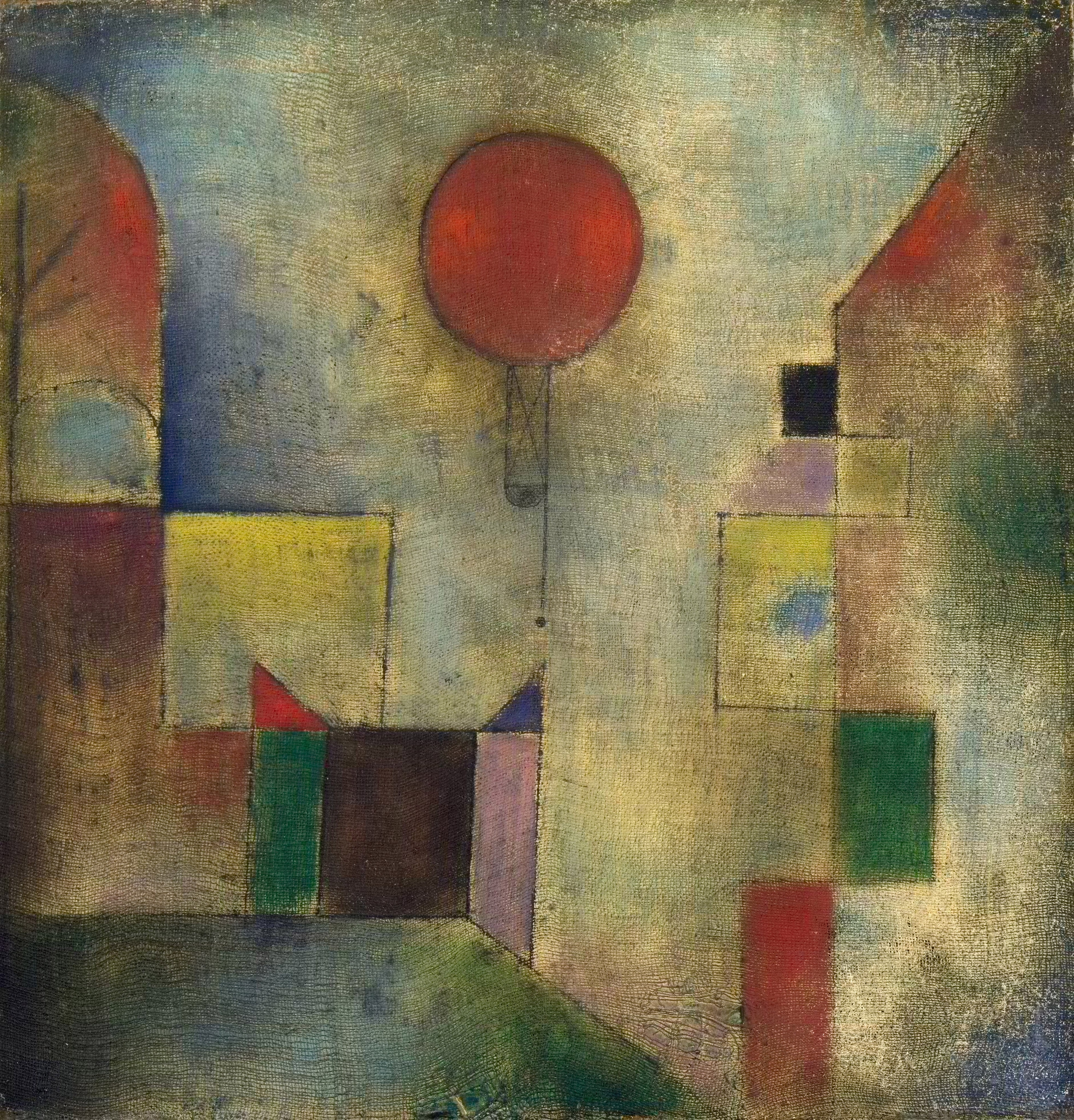
Red Balloon by Paul Klee

In 1937, Guggenheim established the Solomon R. Guggenheim Foundation to foster the appreciation of modern art. The foundation's first venue for the display of art was called the "Museum of Non-Objective Painting". It opened in 1939 under the direction of Rebay, its first curator, in a former automobile showroom at East 54th Street in midtown Manhattan. This moved, in 1947, to another rented space at 1071 Fifth Avenue. Under Rebay's guidance, Guggenheim sought to include in the collection the most important examples of non-objective art available at the time, such as Kandinsky's Composition 8 (1923), Léger's Contrast of Forms (1913) and Delaunay's Simultaneous Windows (2nd Motif, 1st Part) (1912).

By the early 1940s, the foundation had accumulated such a large collection of avant-garde paintings that the need for a permanent building to house the art collection had become apparent. In 1943, Guggenheim and Rebay commissioned architect Frank Lloyd Wright to design the museum building. Rebay conceived of the space as a "temple of the spirit" that would facilitate a new way of looking at the modern pieces in the collection. In 1948, the collection was greatly expanded through the purchase of art dealer Karl Nierendorf's estate of some 730 objects, notably German expressionist paintings. By that time, the foundation's collection included a broad spectrum of expressionist and surrealist works, including paintings by Paul Klee, Oskar Kokoschka and Joan Miró. Guggenheim died in 1949, and the museum was renamed the Solomon R. Guggenheim Museum in 1952. The foundation expanded its display activities with a series of traveling exhibitions.

After Guggenheim's death, members of the Guggenheim family who sat on the foundation's board of directors had personal and philosophical differences with Rebay, and in 1952 she resigned as director of the museum. Nevertheless, she left a portion of her personal collection to the foundation in her will, including works by Kandinsky, Klee, Alexander Calder, Gleizes, Piet Mondrian and Kurt Schwitters.

=== Sweeney and completion of the first building ===
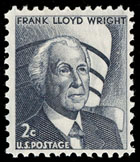
1966 2 Cent U.S. postage stamp honoring Frank Lloyd Wright, showing the Guggenheim in the background

In 1953, the foundation's collecting boundaries extended even further under its new director, James Johnson Sweeney. Sweeney rejected Rebay's dismissal of "objective" painting and sculpture, and he soon acquired Constantin Brâncuși's Adam and Eve (1921), followed by works of other modernist sculptors, including Jean Arp, Alexander Calder, Alberto Giacometti and David Smith. Sweeney reached beyond the 20th century to acquire Paul Cézanne's Man with Crossed Arms (c. 1899). In 1953, the foundation received a gift of 28 important works from the Estate of Katherine S. Dreier, a founder of America's first collection to be called a modern art museum, the Société Anonyme. Dreier had been a colleague of Rebay's. The works included Little French Girl (1914–18) by Brâncuși, an untitled still life (1916) by Juan Gris, a bronze sculpture (1919) by Alexander Archipenko and three collages (1919–21) by German Hanoverian Dadaist Schwitters. It also included works by Calder, Marcel Duchamp, El Lissitzky and Mondrian. Among others, Sweeney also acquired the works of Alberto Giacometti, David Hayes, Willem de Kooning and Jackson Pollock. He also established the Guggenheim International Awards in 1956. Sweeney oversaw the last half dozen years of the construction of the museum building, during which time he had an antagonistic relationship with Frank Lloyd Wright, especially regarding the building's lighting issues.

The distinctive cylindrical building, wider at the top than the bottom, with a spiral ramp climbing gently from ground level to the skylight at the top, turned out to be Wright's last major work, as the architect died six months before its opening. The building opened in October 1959 to large crowds and instantly polarized architecture critics, though today it is widely praised. Some of the criticism focused on the idea that the building overshadows the artworks displayed inside, and that it is difficult to properly hang paintings in the shallow, windowless, concave exhibition niches that surround the central spiral. Prior to its opening, twenty-one artists signed a letter protesting the display of their work in such a space. Upon opening, the museum received a largely favorable response from the public, despite the early misgivings: "overall Wright's design was, and still is, admired for being highly personal and inviting".

=== Messer and the ramp ===
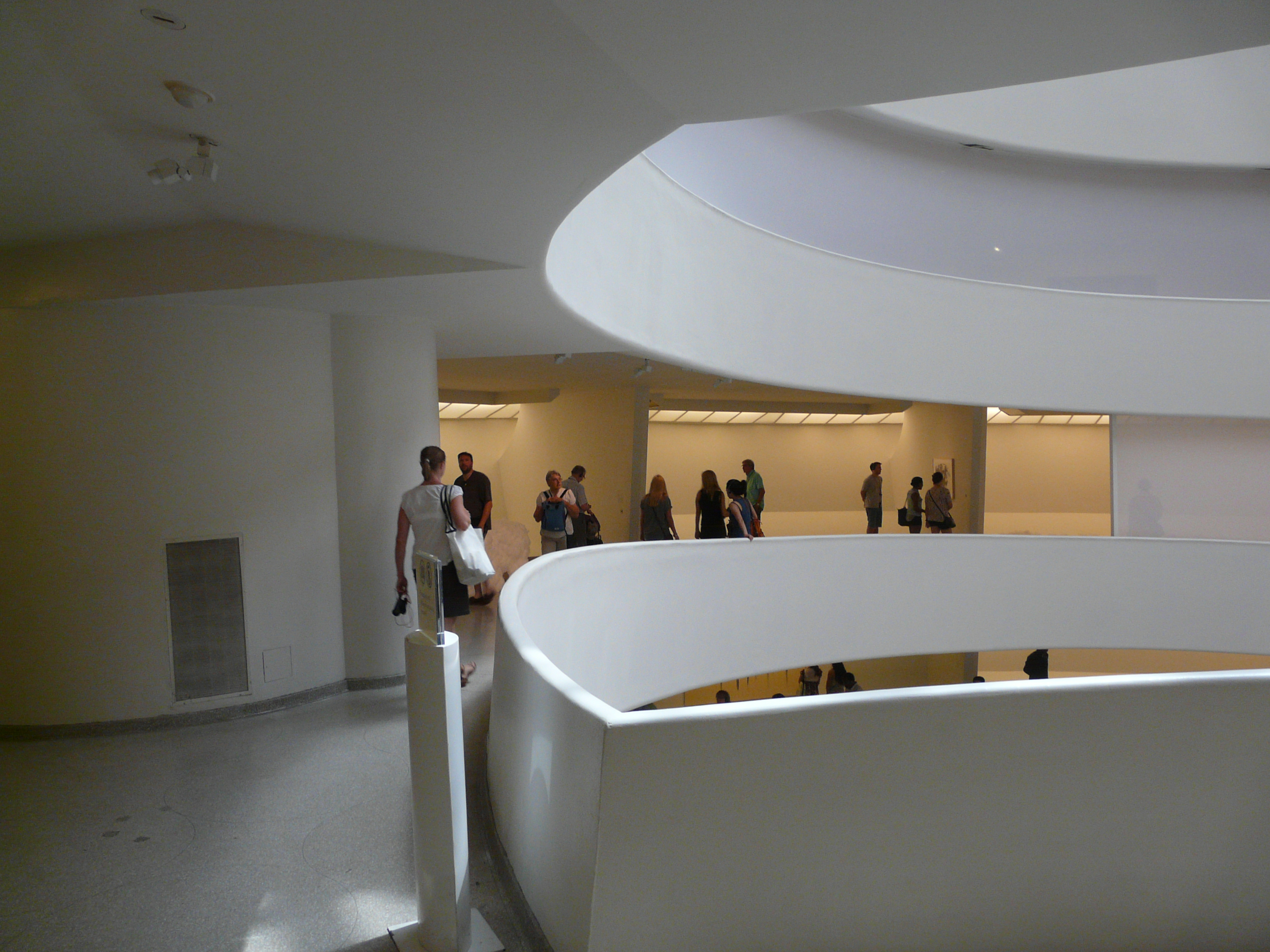
The Guggenheim's gallery – part of the spiral ramp

Thomas M. Messer succeeded Sweeney as director of the museum (but not the foundation) in 1961 and stayed for 27 years, the longest tenure of any of the city's major arts institutions' directors. When Messer took over, the museum's ability to present art at all was still in doubt due to the challenges presented by continuous spiral ramp gallery that is both tilted and has curved walls. Almost immediately, in 1962, he took a risk putting on a large exhibition that combined the Guggenheim's paintings with sculptures on loan from the Hirshhorn Museum. Three-dimensional sculpture, in particular, raised "the problem of installing such a show in a museum bearing so close a resemblance to the circular geography of hell", where any vertical object appears tilted in a "drunken lurch" because the slope of the floor and the curvature of the walls could combine to produce vexing optical illusions.

It turned out that the combination could work well in the Guggenheim's space, but, Messer recalled that at the time, "I was scared. I half felt that this would be my last exhibition." Messer had the foresight to prepare by staging a smaller sculpture exhibition the previous year, in which he discovered how to compensate for the space's weird geometry by constructing special plinths at a particular angle, so the pieces were not at a true vertical yet appeared to be so. In the earlier sculpture show, this trick proved impossible for one piece, an Alexander Calder mobile whose wire inevitably hung at a true plumb vertical, "suggesting hallucination" in the disorienting context of the tilted floor.

The next year, Messer acquired a private collection from art dealer Justin K. Thannhauser for the foundation's permanent collection. These 73 works include Impressionist, Post-Impressionist and French modern masterpieces, including important works by Paul Gauguin, Édouard Manet, Camille Pissarro, Vincent van Gogh and 32 works by Pablo Picasso.

=== Global expansion ===
The Peggy Guggenheim Collection, in Venice

Peggy Guggenheim, Solomon's niece, collected and displayed art beginning in 1938. At Messer's urging, she donated her art collection and home in Venice, the Palazzo Venier dei Leoni, to the foundation in 1976. After her death in 1979, the collection of more than 300 works was re-opened to the public as the Peggy Guggenheim Collection in 1980 by the foundation, which was then under the direction of Peter Lawson-Johnston. It includes early 20th century works of prominent American modernists and Italian futurists. Pieces in the collection embrace Cubism, Surrealism and Abstract expressionism. Some of the notable artists are Picasso, Dalí, Magritte, Brâncuși (including a sculpture from the Bird in Space series), eleven works by Pollock, Braque, Duchamp, Léger, Severini, Picabia, de Chirico, Mondrian, Kandinsky, Miró, Giacometti, Klee, Gorky, Calder, Max Ernst and Peggy Guggenheim's daughter, Pegeen Vail Guggenheim.

Since 1985, the United States has selected the foundation to operate the U.S. Pavilion of the Venice Biennale, an exhibition held every other summer. In 1986, the foundation purchased the Palladian-style pavilion, built in 1930.

Thomas Krens, director of the foundation from 1988 to 2008, led a rapid expansion of the foundation's collections. In 1991, he broadened the foundation's holdings by acquiring the Panza Collection. Assembled by Count Giuseppe Panza di Biumo and his wife, Giovanna, the collection includes examples of Minimalist sculptures by Carl Andre, Dan Flavin and Donald Judd, and Minimalist paintings by Robert Mangold, Brice Marden and Robert Ryman, as well as an array of Post-Minimal, Conceptual, and perceptual art by Robert Morris, Richard Serra, James Turrell, Lawrence Weiner and others, notably American examples of the 1960s and 1970s. In 1992, the Robert Mapplethorpe Foundation gifted 200 of his best photographs to the foundation. The works spanned his entire output, from his early collages, Polaroids, portraits of celebrities, self-portraits, male and female nudes, flowers and statues. It also featured mixed-media constructions and included his well-known 1998 Self-Portrait. The acquisition initiated the foundation's photography exhibition program.

Also in 1992, the New York museum building's exhibition and other space was expanded by the addition of an adjoining rectangular tower, taller than the original spiral, and a renovation of the original building. The same year, the foundation opened the small Guggenheim Museum SoHo in the SoHo neighborhood of downtown Manhattan, designed by Arata Isozaki, and hosted exhibits that included Marc Chagall and the Jewish Theater, Paul Klee at the Guggenheim Museum, Robert Rauschenberg: A Retrospective, and Andy Warhol: The Last Supper. This space was kept after the main museum was re-opened, but it closed in 2002 due to an economic downturn. To finance these moves, controversially, the foundation sold works by Kandinsky, Chagall and Modigliani to raise $47 million, drawing considerable criticism for trading masters for "trendy" latecomers. In The New York Times, critic Michael Kimmelman wrote that the sales "stretched the accepted rules of deaccessioning further than many American institutions have been willing to do." Krens defended the action as consistent with the museum's principles, including expanding its international collection and building its "postwar collection to the strength of our pre-war holdings" and pointed out that such sales are a regular practice by museums.

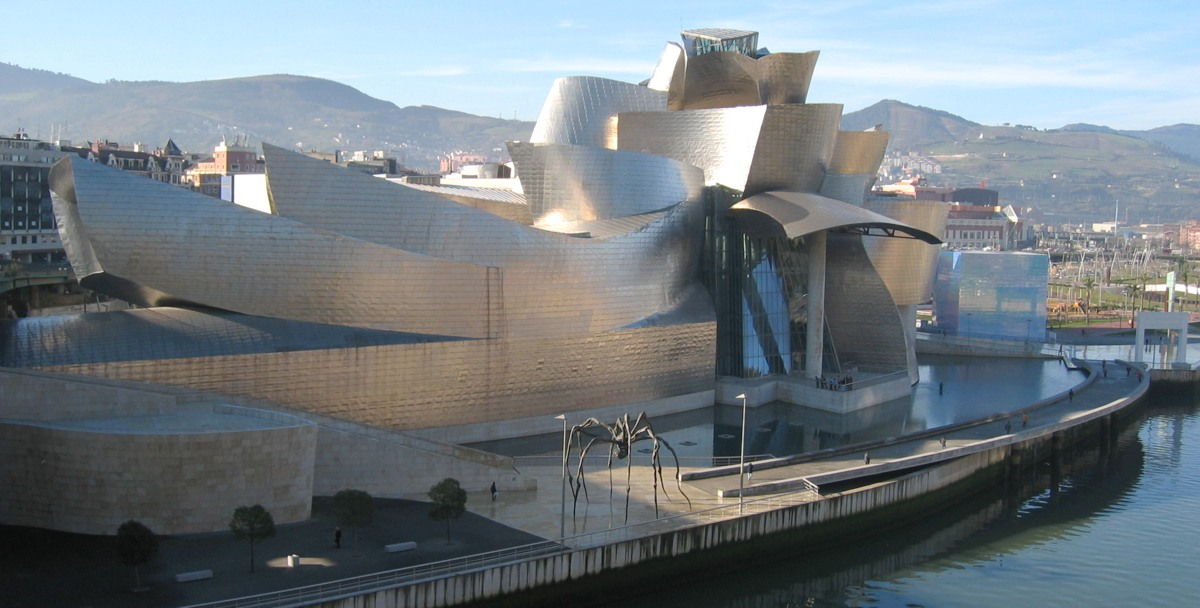
The Guggenheim Museum Bilbao, along the Nervión River in downtown Bilbao

One of Krens's most significant initiatives was to expand the foundation's international presence. The Guggenheim Museum Bilbao opened in 1997. Designed by Frank Gehry, the titanium, glass and limestone Guggenheim Bilbao is a centerpiece of the revitalization of the Basque city of Bilbao, Spain. The building was greeted with glowing praise from architecture critics. The Basque government funded the construction, while the Foundation purchased the artworks and manages the facility. The museum's permanent collection includes works by modern and contemporary Basque and Spanish artists like Eduardo Chillida, Juan Muñoz and Antonio Saura, as well as works from the foundation, and it has organized various exhibitions curated by the Solomon R. Guggenheim Museum in New York.

Also in 1997, the foundation opened a small gallery in the Unter den Linden area of Berlin, Germany, as the Deutsche Guggenheim, in cooperation with the Deutsche Bank. The Deutsche Guggenheim had four exhibitions each year, complemented by educational programming, and it annually commissioned one, or occasionally two, new artworks or series by contemporary artists, which were then displayed at the museum in a special exhibition. After 14 years of operation, Deutsche Guggenheim closed at the end of 2012.

=== Krens exhibitions and abortive projects ===
Under Krens, the foundation mounted some of its most popular exhibitions: "Africa: The Art of a Continent" in 1996; "China: 5,000 Years" in 1998, "Brazil: Body & Soul" in 2001; and "The Aztec Empire" in 2004. Unusual exhibitions included commercial art installations of Giorgio Armani suits and motorcycles. The New Criterion's Hilton Kramer condemned both The Art of the Motorcycle and the retrospective of the work of fashion designer Armani. Others disagreed. A 2009 retrospective of Frank Lloyd Wright at the original New York building showcased the architect on the 50th anniversary of the opening of the building and was the museum's most popular exhibit since it began keeping such attendance records in 1992.

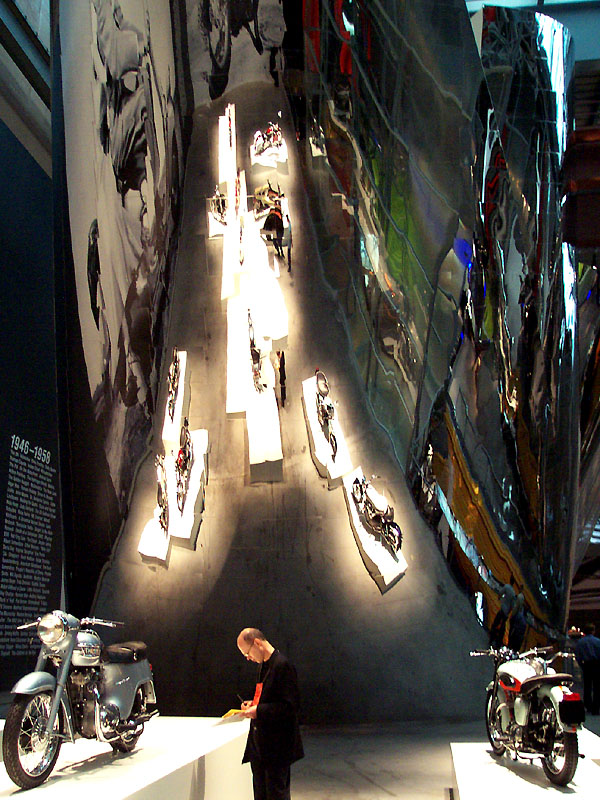
The Art of the Motorcycle exhibition in Las Vegas

In 2001, the foundation opened two new museums in Las Vegas, Guggenheim Las Vegas and Guggenheim Hermitage Museum, both designed by architect Rem Koolhaas. The museums showcased highlights of the collections, respectively, of the foundation and the Hermitage Museum in Saint Petersburg, Russia. The first and larger of the two hosted one exhibition: "The Art of the Motorcycle", before closing in 2003. The latter held ten exhibitions of masterworks by leading artists from the last six centuries, including Van Eyck, Titian, Velázquez, Van Gogh, Picasso, Pollock and Lichtenstein. The Guggenheim Hermitage Museum closed in 2008.

In 2001 the foundation also established the Sackler Center for Arts Education on the campus of the original New York building. The same year, the foundation received a gift of the large collection of the Bohen Foundation, which, for two decades, commissioned new works of art with an emphasis on film, video, photography and new media. Artists included in the collection are Pierre Huyghe, Sophie Calle and Jac Leirner. The foundation planned for a large Guggenheim museum on the waterfront in lower Manhattan, and it engaged Frank Gehry as the architect. His designs for the building were showcased in 2001 at the Fifth Avenue museum, but these plans were disrupted by the economic downturn of the early 2000s and the September 11, 2001 attacks, which prompted reconsideration of any plans in lower Manhattan. Other projects were considered but not completed in Rio de Janeiro, Vilnius, Salzburg, Taichung and Guadalajara

On January 19, 2005, the philanthropist Peter B. Lewis resigned from his position as chairman of the foundation, expressing his opposition to Krens' plans for further global expansion of the Guggenheim museums. Lewis had been the largest donor in the history of the Guggenheim. Tensions continued, however, and on February 27, 2008, Krens resigned from his position at the foundation. He remained, however, as an advisor for international affairs. Over his two decades at the head of the foundation, Krens was criticized not only for the deaccessioning of older works of the museum but for both his businesslike style and perceived populism and commercialization. One writer commented, "Krens has been both praised and vilified for turning what was once a small New York institution into a worldwide brand, creating the first truly multinational arts institution. ... Krens transformed the Guggenheim into one of the best-known brand name in the arts."

=== Armstrong and later years ===
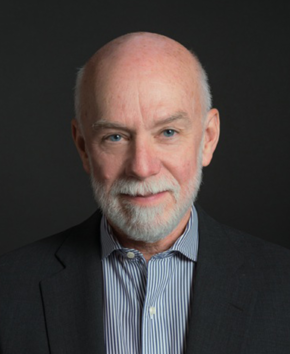
Richard Armstrong, 2012

Richard Armstrong became the fifth director of the foundation on November 4, 2008. He had been director of the Carnegie Museum of Art in Pittsburgh, Pennsylvania for 12 years, where he had also served as chief curator and curator of contemporary art. In addition to its permanent collections, which continue to grow, the foundation administers loan exhibitions and co-organizes exhibitions with other museums to foster public outreach.

In 2006, Abu Dhabi, the capital of the United Arab Emirates, announced an agreement with the Guggenheim Foundation to build a new museum, "Guggenheim Abu Dhabi". Gehry designed the structure, which will, if completed, be the foundation's largest by far. It began construction on the northwest tip of Saadiyat Island, where a performing arts center and other museums have been built. The completion date has been pushed back repeatedly. The museum is expected to house modern and contemporary collections that will focus on Middle-Eastern contemporary art and to display special exhibitions from the foundation's main collection.

In 2011, the city of Helsinki, Finland, commissioned the foundation to study the feasibility of constructing a museum there. The study recommended building the museum in Helsinki's South Harbor. In 2012, the proposal was rejected by the city board, and in 2013, the foundation made a revised proposal. The Guggenheim's licensing fee was to be funded by private sources; one journalist called the Foundation's cost and revenue estimates "speculative at best". An international architecture competition solicited designs for the museum, and in 2015, a design was chosen. In 2016 the Helsinki city council voted to reject the plan.

Armstrong left the museum at the end of 2023. In June 2024, Mariët Westermann, previously the vice chancellor of New York University Abu Dhabi, became the Guggenheim's first female director.

== Restitution claims ==
In 2007, the heirs of Berlin banker Paul von Mendelssohn-Bartholdy requested the restitution of the Picasso painting "Le Moulin de la Galette" (1900), which they claimed he had sold under duress by the Nazis. The museum and the heirs settled the lawsuit in 2009. The presiding judge, Jed Rakoff, criticized the secrecy of the accord. In 2018, the museum returned the Ernst Ludwig Kirchner painting Artillerymen (1915) to the heirs of Alfred Flechtheim, who had owned the painting before it fell into the hands of a Nazi collector in 1938.

In 2023, the heirs of Karl and Rosie Adler sued the Guggenheim to claim the restitution of a Picasso painting, Woman Ironing (La repasseuse) (1904), which the Adlers sold to Justin Thannhauser in 1938, allegedly for a fraction of its value, to escape the Holocaust. They alleged that Thannhauser knowingly purchased the painting, and art from other Jews on the run, profiting unfairly from their distress. The museum says they contacted the Adler family before acquiring the painting as a part of Thannhauser's bequest of his art collection in 1976, and at that time Karl Adler did not object.

The Guggenheim lists 289 artworks on the Nazi Era Provenance Internet Portal (NEPIP) but does not publish provenance for its collection.

== Architecture ==
The foundation has long sought, in its constituent museums, to unite its artworks with distinguished architecture. In 1943, Hilla von Rebay and Solomon R. Guggenheim commissioned Frank Lloyd Wright to build the foundation's first permanent museum. Rebay wrote to Wright that "each of these great masterpieces should be organized into space, and only you ... would test the possibilities to do so. … I want a temple of spirit, a monument!" The resultant achievement, the Solomon R. Guggenheim Museum, in New York City, testifies not only to Wright's architectural genius, but also to the adventurous spirit that characterized its founders. The critic Paul Goldberger later wrote that, before Wright's modernist building, "there were only two common models for museum design: Beaux-arts Palace ... and the International Style Pavilion." Goldberger thought the building a catalyst for change, making it "socially and culturally acceptable for an architect to design a highly expressive, intensely personal museum. In this sense almost every museum of our time is a child of the Guggenheim."

=== New York ===
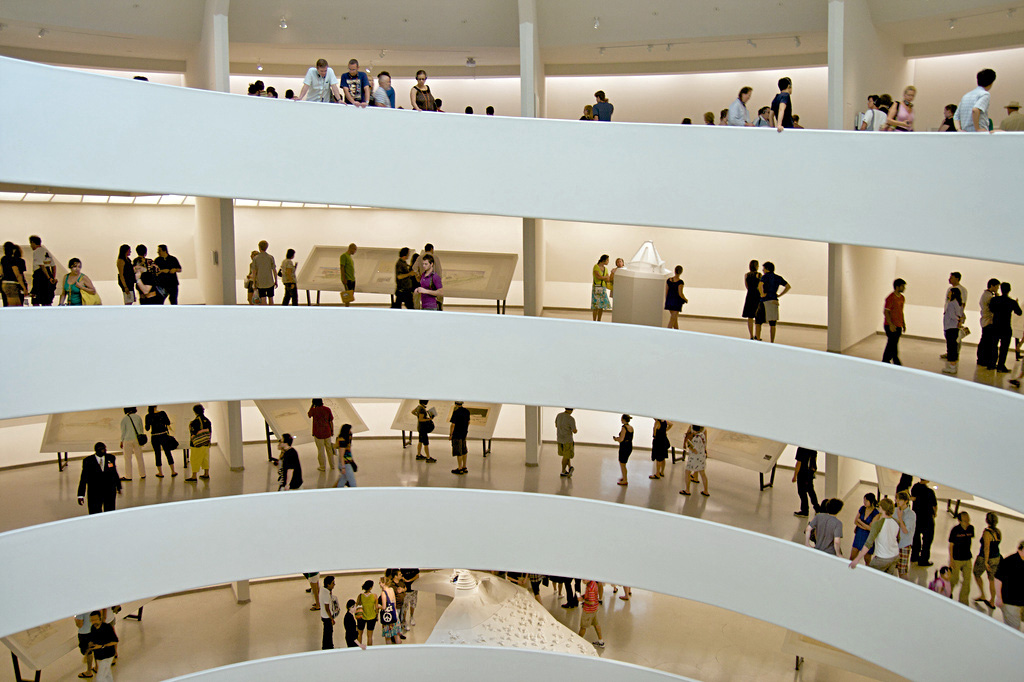
An interior view of the museum

Before settling on the present site for the Solomon R. Guggenheim Museum on Fifth Avenue between 88th and 89th Streets, Wright, Rebay and Guggenheim considered numerous locations in Manhattan, as well as in the Riverdale section of the Bronx, overlooking the Hudson River. Guggenheim felt that the site's proximity to Central Park was important; the park afforded relief from the noise, congestion and concrete of the city. Nature also provided the museum with inspiration. The building embodies Wright's attempts "to render the inherent plasticity of organic forms in architecture." The Guggenheim was to be the only museum designed by Wright. The city location required Wright to design the building in a vertical rather than a horizontal form, far different from his earlier, rural works.

Wright's original concept was called an inverted "ziggurat", because it resembled the steep steps on the ziggurats built in ancient Mesopotamia. His design dispensed with the conventional approach to museum layout, in which visitors are led through a series of interconnected rooms and forced to retrace their steps when exiting. Wright's plan was for the museum guests to ride to the top of the building by elevator, to descend at a leisurely pace along the gentle slope of the continuous ramp, and to view the atrium of the building as the last work of art. The open rotunda afforded viewers the unique possibility of seeing several bays of work on different levels simultaneously and even to interact with guests on other levels. The spiral design recalled a nautilus shell, with continuous spaces flowing freely one into another.

Even as it embraced nature, Wright's design also expresses his take on modernist architecture's rigid geometry. Wright ascribed a symbolic meaning to the building's shapes. He explained, "these geometric forms suggest certain human ideas, moods, sentiments – as for instance: the circle, infinity; the triangle, structural unity; the spiral, organic progress; the square, integrity." Forms echo one another throughout: oval-shaped columns, for example, reiterate the geometry of the fountain. Circularity is the leitmotif, from the rotunda to the inlaid design of the terrazzo floors.

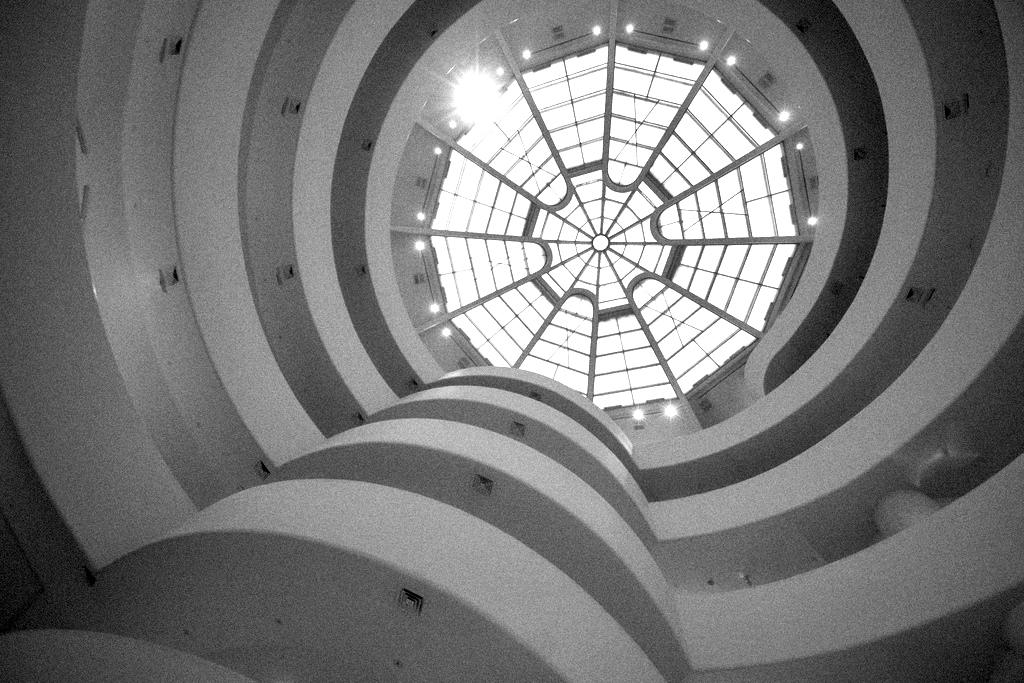
The Guggenheim atrium, looking up at the skylight

Wright's vision took 16 years to be fulfilled. Set in sharp contrast to typically rectangular Manhattan buildings that surround it, the Solomon R. Guggenheim Museum building opened in October 1959. Even before it opened, the design polarized architecture critics. Some believed that the building would overshadow the museum's artworks. "On the contrary", wrote the architect, the design makes "the building and the painting an uninterrupted, beautiful symphony such as never existed in the World of Art before." Other critics, and many artists, felt that it is awkward to properly hang paintings in the shallow, windowless, concave exhibition niches that surround the central spiral. The building, nevertheless, became widely praised and inspired many other architects.

The building's surface was made out of concrete to reduce the cost, inferior to the stone finish that Wright had wanted. The small rotunda (or "Monitor building", as Wright called it) next to the large rotunda was intended to house apartments for Rebay and Guggenheim but instead became offices and storage space. In 1965, the second floor of the Monitor building was renovated to display the museum's growing permanent collection, and with the restoration of the museum in 1990–92, it was turned over entirely to exhibition space and christened the Thannhauser Building, in honor of one of the most important bequests to the museum. Wright's original plan for an adjoining tower, artists' studios and apartments went unrealized, largely for financial reasons. However, as part of the restoration, architects Gwathmey Siegel and Associates analyzed Wright's original sketches to design the rectangular 10-story limestone tower, that stands behind, and taller than, the original spiral building (replacing a much smaller structure), which has four additional exhibition galleries with flat walls that are "more appropriate for the display of art." Also in the original construction, the main gallery skylight had been covered, which compromised Wight's carefully articulated lighting effects. This changed in 1992 when the skylight was restored to its original design. Funding for the alterations was raised partly through the controversial sale of masterworks by the foundation in 1991.

In 2001, the museum opened the Sackler Center for Arts Education to the public, which was another part of Wright's original design for the building, through a gift of the Mortimer D. Sackler family. Located just below the large rotunda, this 8,200-square-foot education facility provides classes and lectures about the visual and performing arts and opportunities to interact with the museum's collections and special exhibitions through its labs, exhibition spaces, conference rooms and the Peter B. Lewis Theater. Between September 2005 and July 2008, the Guggenheim Museum underwent a significant exterior restoration to repair cracks and modernize systems and exterior details. Artist Jenny Holzer painted a tribute, For the Guggenheim, in honor of Peter B. Lewis, a major benefactor in the restoration project. The museum was registered as a National Historic Landmark on October 6, 2008.

=== Venice ===
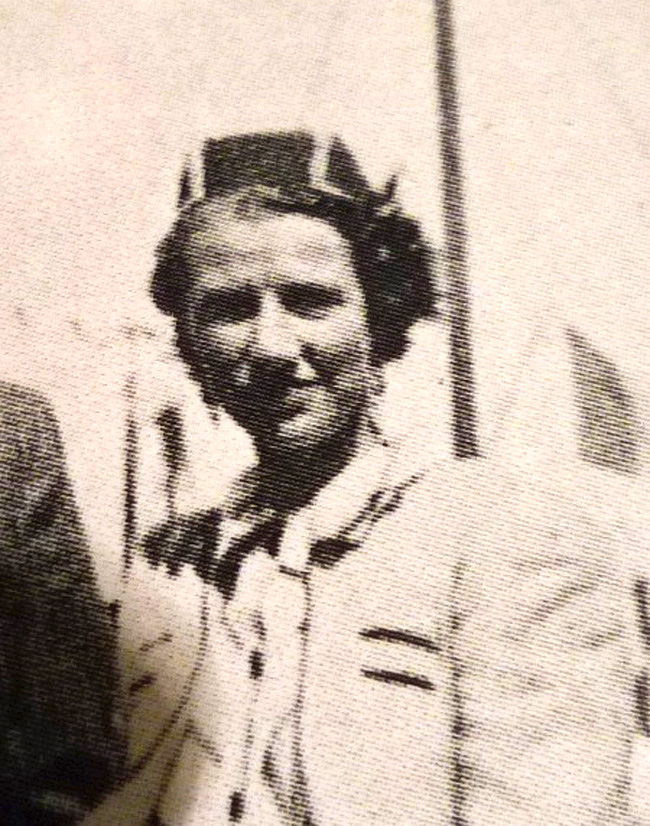
Peggy Guggenheim, Marseille, 1937

Peggy Guggenheim purchased the Palazzo Venier dei Leoni in 1948 to house and display her collection to the public, and she resided there for thirty years. Although sometimes mistaken for a modern building, it is an 18th-century palace designed by the Venetian architect Lorenzo Boschetti. The building was unfinished and has an unusually low elevation on the Grand Canal. The museum's website describes its "long low façade, made of Istrian stone and set off against the trees in the garden behind that soften its lines, forms a welcome "caesura" in the stately march of Grand Canal palaces from the Accademia to the Salute."

The Foundation took control of the building in 1979 following Guggenheim's death and took steps to expand gallery space. By 1985, "all of the rooms on the main floor had been converted into galleries ... the white Istrian stone facade and the unique canal terrace had been restored", and a protruding arcade wing, called the barchessa, had been rebuilt by architect Giorgio Bellavitis. Since 1985, the museum has been open year-round. In 1993, the foundation converted apartments adjacent to the museum into a garden annex, a shop and more galleries. In 1995, the Nasher Sculpture Garden was completed, Since 1993, the museum has doubled in size, from 2,000 to 4,000 square meters. and it was renovated in 2012.

=== Bilbao ===
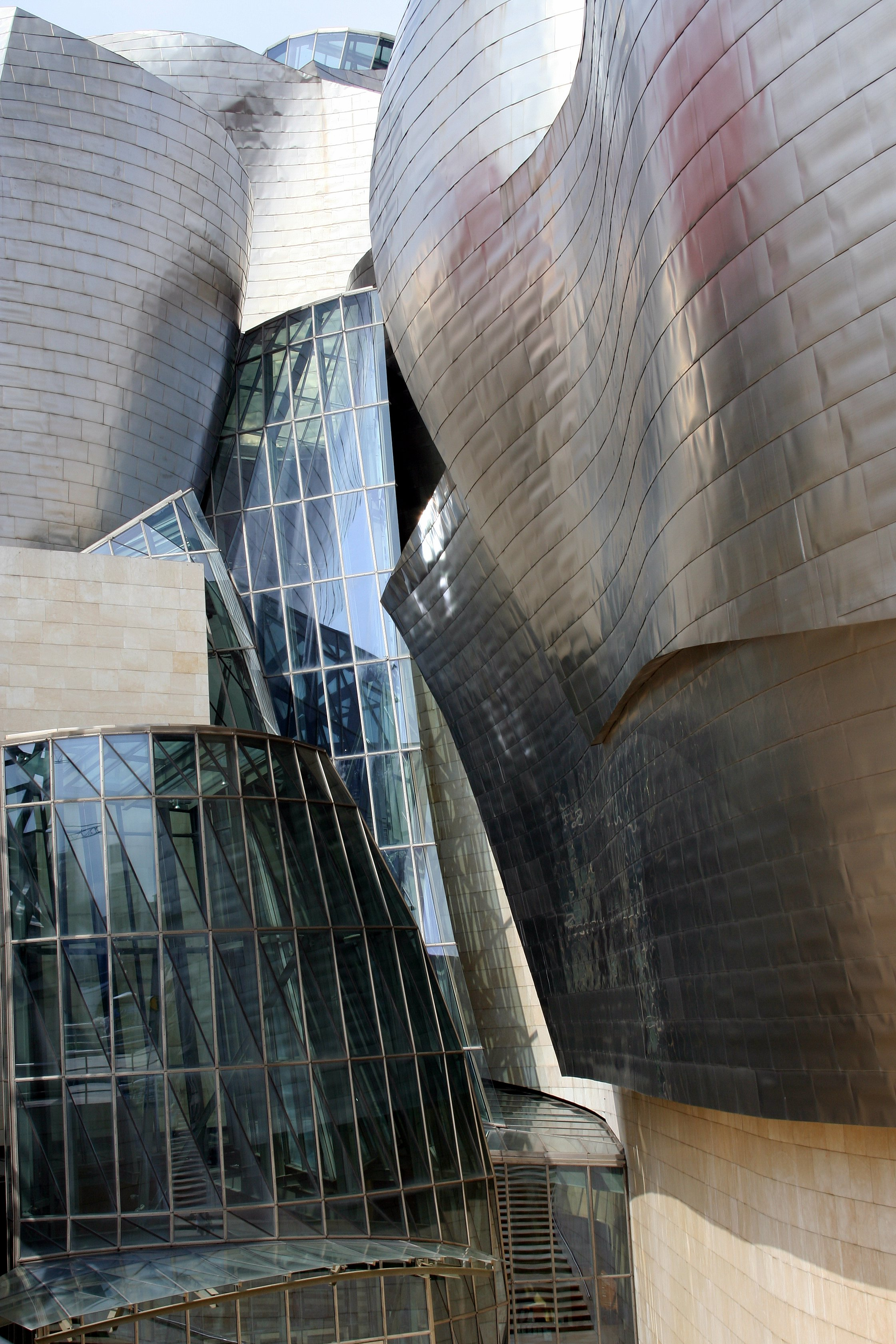
The museum is clad in glass, titanium, and limestone

In 1991, the Basque government suggested to the foundation that it would fund a Guggenheim museum to be built in Bilbao. The foundation selected Frank Gehry as the architect, and its director, Thomas Krens, encouraged him to design something daring and innovative. The curves on the exterior of the building were intended to appear random; the architect said that "the randomness of the curves are designed to catch the light". The interior "is designed around a large, light-filled atrium with views of Bilbao's estuary and the surrounding hills of the Basque country."

When the Guggenheim Museum Bilbao opened to the public in 1997, it was immediately hailed as one of the world's most spectacular buildings, a masterpiece of the 20th century. Architect Philip Johnson described it as "the greatest building of our time", while critic Calvin Tomkins, in The New Yorker, characterized it as "a fantastic dream ship of undulating form in a cloak of titanium", its brilliantly reflective panels also reminiscent of fish scales. Herbert Muschamp praised its "mercurial brilliance" in The New York Times Magazine. The Independent calls the museum "an astonishing architectural feat".

The museum is seamlessly integrated into the urban context, unfolding its interconnecting shapes of stone, glass and titanium on a 32,500-square-meter site along the Nervión River in the old industrial heart of the city; while modest from street level, it is most impressive when viewed from the river. Eleven thousand square meters of exhibition space are distributed over nineteen galleries, ten of which follow a classic orthogonal plan that can be identified from the exterior by their stone finishes. The remaining nine galleries are irregularly shaped and can be identified from the outside by their swirling organic forms and titanium cladding. The largest gallery measures 30 meters wide and 130 meters long. Since 2005, it has housed Richard Serra's monumental installation "The Matter of Time".

=== Berlin ===
Deutsche Guggenheim, in Berlin, opened one month after the Guggenheim Museum Bilbao, in 1997. Designed by American architect Richard Gluckman in a minimalist style, the modest Berlin gallery occupied a corner of the ground floor of the sandstone Deutsche Bank building, in the Unter der Linden boulevard, constructed in 1920. It closed in 2013.

=== Abu Dhabi ===
The museum in Abu Dhabi is planned to be the foundation's largest facility by far. Gehry's design features exhibition galleries, education and research space, a conservation laboratory, a center for contemporary Arab, Islamic and Middle Eastern culture, and a center for "art and technology". Inspired by traditional middle-eastern covered courtyards and wind towers, used to cool structures exposed to the desert sun, the museum's clusters of horizontal and vertical galleries of various sizes are connected by catwalks and planned around a central, covered courtyard, incorporating natural features intended to maximize the energy efficiency of the building. The largest galleries will offer a grand scale for the display of large contemporary art installations. Parts of the building will be four stories tall, with "clusters of block and cone-shaped connected galleries seemingly piled on top of each other." The museum is intended to be a centerpiece in the island's plan for contemporary art and culture".

The new museum began construction on a peninsula at the northwestern tip of Saadiyat Island adjacent to Abu Dhabi. Gehry commented, "The site itself, virtually on the water or close to the water on all sides, in a desert landscape with the beautiful sea and the light quality of the place suggested some of the direction." The completion date was pushed back from 2011 to at least 2017. In March 2011, over 130 artists announced a plan to boycott the Abu Dhabi museum, citing reports of abuses of foreign workers, including the arbitrary withholding of wages, unsafe working conditions and failure of companies to pay recruitment fees to laborers. Continued progress awaits the approval of construction applications and contracts by the Tourism Development & Investment Company (TDIC). As of early 2016, no progress had been made on construction, and the Guggenheim Foundation confirmed that "TDIC has not yet awarded a contract."

=== Helsinki design (never built) ===
The Guggenheim Helsinki Design Competition in 2014–2015 was the Solomon R. Guggenheim Foundation's first open, international architectural competition. It received 1,715 submissions from 77 countries, a record for a museum design competition. The design chosen for a proposed €130 million Guggenheim museum in Helsinki, Finland, envisioned "an indistinct jumble of pavilions faced in charred wood" and glass. The winning design was by Paris-based Moreau Kusunoki Architectes. Critics objected to the dark color of the design's exterior, which contrasts with the surrounding architecture, as well as the shape of the building. Osku Pajamaki, vice chairman of the city's executive board, said: "The symbol of the lighthouse is arrogant in the middle of the historical center ... [like] a Guggenheim museum next to Notre Dame in Paris. People are approaching from the sea, and the first thing that they will see is that the citizens of Helsinki bought their identity from the Guggenheim." The proposed museum was rejected by the Helsinki city council in 2016.

== Collaborations ==
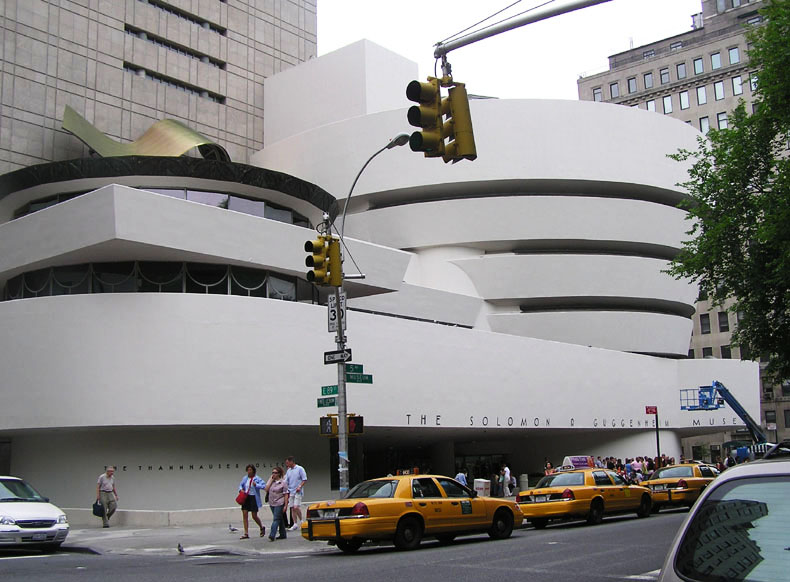
The front of the Guggenheim Museum from 5th Avenue, New York City

The foundation annually lends hundreds of works of art from its collections to other museums and institutions around the world. It also enters into collaborations with partners throughout the world to engage with diverse audiences and to promote cultural discourse. From 2006 to 2011, exhibitions of the foundation's works were seen in more than 80 museums, such as the National Art Museum of China in Beijing during the 2008 Beijing Olympic Games.

=== YouTube Play ===
In 2010, the Solomon R. Guggenheim Foundation and YouTube, in collaboration with Hewlett-Packard and Intel, presented YouTube Play, A Biennial of Creative Video. More than 23,000 videos from 91 countries were submitted in response to an open call for submissions aimed "to discover and showcase the most exceptional talent working in the ever-expanding realm of online video". Foundation curators selected a short list of 125 videos from which a jury, including artists Laurie Anderson and Takashi Murakami and the musical group Animal Collective, picked a playlist of 25 works. These were featured at the YouTube Play event at the Solomon R. Guggenheim Museum in New York on October 21, 2010, during which the videos were projected on the exterior of the museum building and inside the museum's rotunda.

The 25 selected works continued on view at the museum until October 24, 2010. The 125 short list videos were on view throughout the fall of 2010 at kiosks at Guggenheim museums in New York, Berlin, Bilbao and Venice. The project's YouTube channel, youtube.com/play, features all of the short list videos, as well as highlights from the event in New York and information about the project. The collaboration was intended to reach wide audiences beyond the museum environment. New York Times art critic Roberta Smith commented: "It is an idea whose time has come. ... In many ways it is simply an old-fashioned open-submission exhibition of the kind that regional museums and art centers around the country have staged for decades – except that it has gone digital."

=== BMW Guggenheim Lab ===
The BMW Guggenheim Lab is an interdisciplinary travelling project that began in 2011. A collaboration between the BMW Group and the foundation, the lab is part urban think tank, part community center, and part gathering space, which explores issues of urban life through public programming and discourse. The program is designed to proactively engage residents from each city that it visits, and participants on the Internet and from around the world, in free programs and experiments, and to address ideas and issues of urban living with particular relevance to each city. The Lab's Advisory Committee of experts nominates each city's lab team, an interdisciplinary group that creates the programming for that location. The lab was expected to visit nine cities for three months each over the course of six years, with three different structures housing the lab, each of which was to travel to three cities. In 2013, however, BMW ended its support of the project.

The lab's structure was designed by the Tokyo-based architecture firm Atelier Bow-Wow. The project's three-city cycle was designed around the theme Confronting Comfort, which explored ways of making urban environments more responsive to people's needs, striking a balance between individual and collective comfort, and promoting environmental and social responsibility. The Lab's Advisory Committee members were: Daniel Barenboim, Elizabeth Diller, Nicholas Humphrey, Muchadeyi Masunda, Enrique Peñalosa, Juliet Schor, Rirkrit Tiravanija, and Wang Shi. The lab was open from August 3 to October 16, 2011, in New York City's East Village and was attended by over 54,000 visitors from 60 countries. The Lab was open in Berlin from May 24 to July 29, 2012. The programming of the Berlin Lab focused on four main topics: Empowerment Technologies (Gómez-Márquez), Dynamic Connections (Smith), Urban Micro-Lens (Rose) and the Senseable (SENSEable) City (Ratti). The Lab opened in Mumbai, India, on December 9, 2012, and ran until January 20, 2013. The central location was on the grounds of the Dr. Bhau Daji Lad Museum, with additional satellite locations around the city. Along with neighborhood-specific public programming, the Mumbai Lab program included participatory research studies and design projects.

The program ended with an exhibition, Participatory City: 100 Urban Trends from the BMW Guggenheim Lab, which was on view at the New York museum from October 11, 2013, through January 5, 2014.

=== Guggenheim UBS MAP Global Art Initiative ===
The Guggenheim UBS MAP Global Art Initiative was a five-year program, supported by Swiss bank UBS in which the Foundation identified and worked with artists, curators and educators from Asia, Latin America, the Middle East and North Africa to expand its reach in the international art world. For each of the three phases of the project, the museum invited one curator from the chosen region to the Guggenheim Museum in New York City for a two-year curatorial residency to work with a team of Guggenheim staff to identify new artworks that reflect the range of talents in their parts of the world. The resident curators organized international touring exhibitions that highlighted these artworks and helped to organize educational activities. The Foundation acquired these artworks for its permanent collection and included them as the focus of exhibitions at the museum in New York and subsequently traveled to two other cultural institutions or other venues around the world. The Foundation supplemented the exhibitions with a series of public and online programs based on the theme of cross-cultural exchange. UBS reportedly contributed more than $40 million to the project to pay for its activities and the art acquisitions. Foundation director Richard Armstrong commented: "We are hoping to challenge our Western-centric view of art history."

The first exhibition (phase 1) focused on art from South and Southeast Asia and was curated by Singaporean June Yap, who worked in the curatorial departments of such modern and contemporary art museums as the Institute of Contemporary Arts Singapore and the Singapore Art Museum. The second and third phases of the project focused on Latin America and the Middle East and North Africa.

=== Robert H.N. Ho Family Foundation ===
The Hong Kong-based Robert H.N. Ho Family Foundation (founded by Robert Hung-Ngai Ho) made a $10 million grant to help the New York museum to commission works for its permanent collection by at least three Chinese-born artists and to hire a curator dedicated to its Chinese art collection. The works were to be exhibited at the museum in New York in three exhibitions between 2014 and 2017 and also at the other Guggenheim museums. The commissions were part of an effort by the museum to broaden the geographical scope of its collection, and the Robert H.N. Ho Family Foundation hoped that the collaboration would foster "a greater understanding of Chinese culture."

== See also ==
- List of Guggenheim Museums
- List of art museums in the U.S.
