= Woman with Animals =

Painting by Albert Gleizes

- La dame aux bêtes (French)
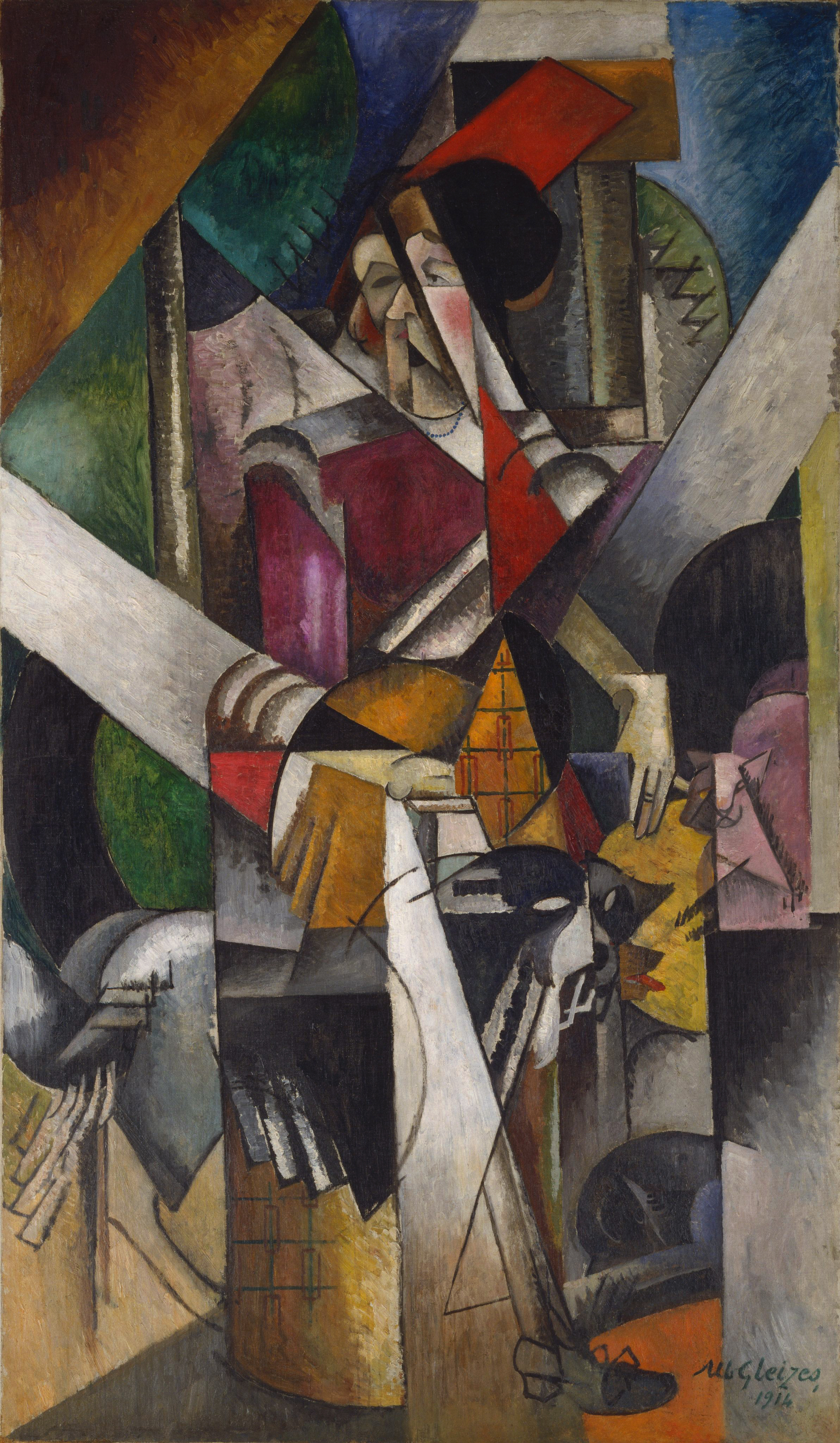
- Artist: Albert Gleizes
- Year: 1914
- Medium: Oil on canvas
- Dimensions: 196.4 cm × 114.1 cm (77.3 in × 45.9 in)
- Location: Peggy Guggenheim Collection; Venice

Woman with Animals, originally referred to as La dame aux bêtes and Portrait de Mme D.V. or Madame Raymond Duchamp-Villon, is a painting created late 1913 and completed during the month of February, 1914, by the French artist, theorist and writer Albert Gleizes. The painting was exhibited at the Salon des Indépendants, Paris, 1 March – 30 April 1914 (titled Portrait de Mme D.V.). Woman with animals is executed in a personal Cubist style noted by the fusing background and figure, the multiple perspective or successive views at various moments in time of the Mrs. Duchamp-Villon's face and other elements, the freestyle brushstrokes delineating juxtaposing planes. The work was restored in 1940 by Jacques Villon and Robert Delaunay. Formerly in the collection of Marcel Duchamp, the work—along with a 1913 lavis and gouache study of the same subject entitled La femme aux bêtes—has been in the Peggy Guggenheim Collection, Venice, Italy, since 1940.

== Description ==
Woman with animals (Madame Raymond Duchamp-Villon) is an oil painting on canvas with dimensions 196.4 x 114.1 cm (77.3 by 45.9 inches), signed and dated Alb Gleizes, 1914, lower right.

Gleizes formally resolves a domestic interior scene in a lucid and logically self-conscious synthetic style, as in several other paintings of this period (e.g., Femmes cousant, Kröller-Müller Museum, Femmes assises à une fenêtre, private collection, Portrait of Igor Stravinsky, Museum of Modern Art, and Woman at the piano, Philadelphia Museum of Art). The limited color harmonies of 1910 through 1912 already questioned in 1913 had now been entirely replaced by an unlimited color palette.

The seated woman represents the wife of Raymond Duchamp-Villon, the sculptor who took part in the discussions of the Section d'Or group at Puteaux during 1911 and 1912. She is portrayed as "the epitome of bourgeois complacency", in a large armchair, with her dog and two cats, wedding band, and string of beads. Cubist elements observed here are the fusion of the background and figure, the frontal, centralized pose, the multiple or successive views of the Mrs. Duchamp-Villon's face, the freestyle brushstrokes delineating juxtaposing planes, and the dog's wagging tail seen at successive moments in time. The planar intersections and lines of force "express notions of the dynamic interpenetration of matter and atmosphere." (Guggenheim)

== See also ==
- List of works by Albert Gleizes
