= Peggy Guggenheim =

American art collector (1898–1979)

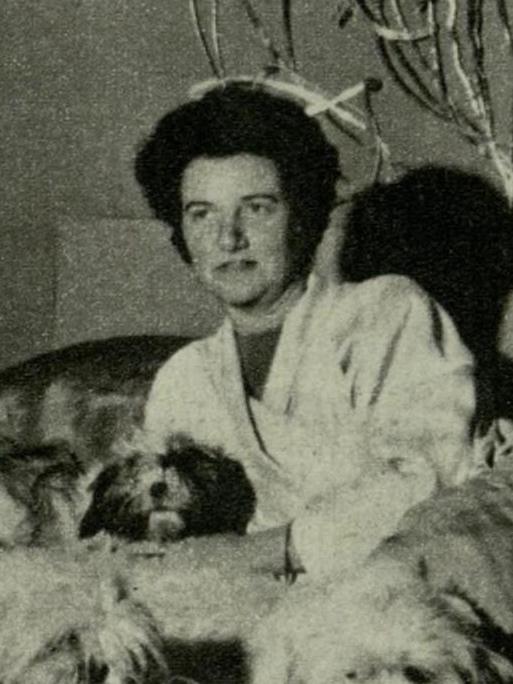
- Guggenheim in 1958
- Born: Marguerite Guggenheim; August 26, 1898; New York City, U.S.
- Died: December 23, 1979 (aged 81); Camposampiero, Italy
- Known for: Peggy Guggenheim Collection
- Spouse(s): Laurence Vail (m. 1922; div. c. 1928) Max Ernst (m. 1941; div. 1946)
- Partner: Douglas Garman (192?–193?)
- Children: Pegeen Vail Guggenheim; Michael Cedric Sindbad Vail
- Parent(s): Florette Seligman; Benjamin Guggenheim
- Relatives: Barbara Hazel Guggenheim (sister)
- Family: Guggenheim

Marguerite "Peggy" Guggenheim (/ˈɡʊɡənhaɪm/ GUUG-ən-hyme; August 26, 1898 – December 23, 1979) was an American art collector, bohemian, and socialite. Born to the wealthy New York City Guggenheim family, she was the daughter of Benjamin Guggenheim, who went down with the Titanic in 1912, and the niece of Solomon R. Guggenheim, who established the Solomon R. Guggenheim Foundation. Guggenheim collected art in Europe and America between 1938 and 1946. She exhibited this collection as she built it. In 1949, she settled in Venice, where she lived and exhibited her collection for the rest of her life. The Peggy Guggenheim Collection is a modern art museum on the Grand Canal in Venice, Italy, and is one of the most visited attractions in the city.

== Early life ==
Guggenheim's parents were of Ashkenazi Jewish descent. Her mother, Florette Seligman (1870–1937), was a member of the Seligman family. When she turned 21 in 1919, Guggenheim inherited US$2.5 million, equivalent to US$46.4 million in 2025. Guggenheim's father, Benjamin Guggenheim, a member of the Guggenheim family, who died in the sinking of the Titanic, had not amassed a fortune comparable to his siblings; therefore her inheritance was far less than that of her cousins. She had a sister, Barbara Hazel Guggenheim, who became a painter and art collector.

She first worked as a clerk in an avant-garde bookstore, the Sunwise Turn, in Midtown Manhattan, where she became enamored of the members of the bohemian artistic community. In 1920, she went to live in Paris. Once there, she became friendly with avant-garde writers and artists, many of whom were living in poverty in the Montparnasse quarter of the city. Man Ray photographed her, and was, along with Constantin Brâncuși and Marcel Duchamp, a friend whose art she was eventually to promote.

She became close friends with writer Natalie Barney and artist Romaine Brooks and was a regular at Barney's salon. She met Djuna Barnes during this time and in time, became her friend and patron. Barnes wrote her best-known novel, Nightwood, while staying at the Devon country house, Hayford Hall, that Guggenheim had rented for two summers.

Guggenheim urged Emma Goldman to write her autobiography and helped to secure funds for her to live in Saint-Tropez, France, while writing her two volume Living My Life. Guggenheim wrote her autobiography entitled Out of This Century, later revised and re-published as Confessions of an Art Addict that was released in 1946 and is now published by Harper Collins.

== Collecting, before World War II ==
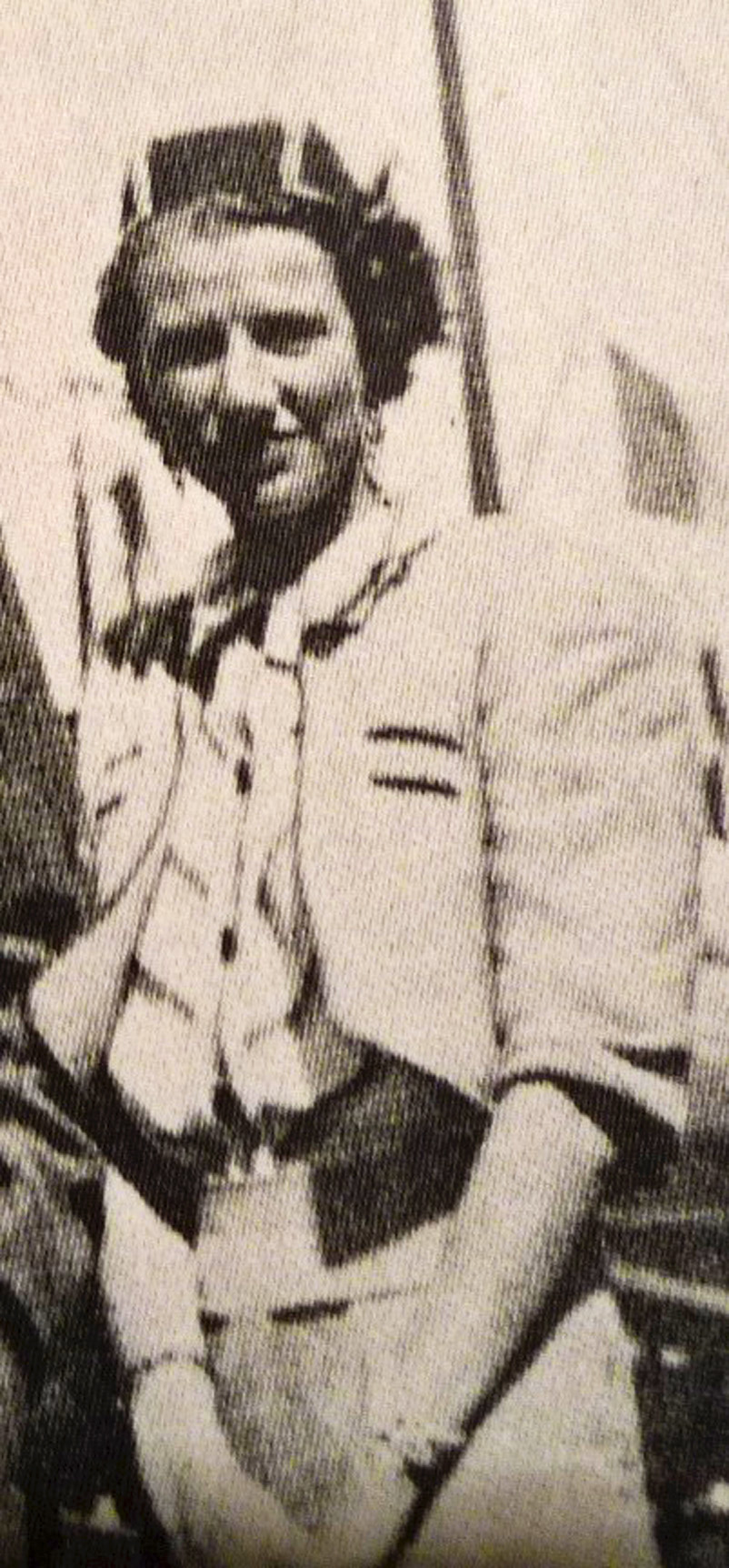
Guggenheim in 1937

In January 1938, Guggenheim opened a gallery for modern art in London featuring Jean Cocteau drawings in its first show, and she began to collect works of art. Guggenheim often purchased at least one object from each of her exhibitions at the gallery. After the outbreak of World War II, she purchased as much abstract and Surrealist art as possible.

Her first gallery was entitled Guggenheim Jeune, the name ingeniously chosen to associate her gallery with both the epitome of a gallery, the French Bernheim-Jeune, and bearing the name of her own well-known family. The gallery on 30 Cork Street, next to Roland Penrose's and E. L. T. Mesens' show-case for the Surrealist movement, proved to be successful, thanks to many friends who gave advice and who helped to run the gallery. Marcel Duchamp, whom she had known since the early 1920s when she lived in Paris with her first husband Laurence Vail, had introduced Guggenheim to the art world; it was through him that she met many artists during her frequent visits to Paris. He taught her about contemporary art and styles and he conceived several of the exhibitions held at Guggenheim Jeune.

The Cocteau exhibition was followed by exhibitions of Wassily Kandinsky (his first solo exhibition in England), Yves Tanguy, Wolfgang Paalen, several other well-known artists, and some lesser-known artists. Peggy Guggenheim held group exhibitions of sculpture and collage, with the participation of the now-classic moderns Antoine Pevsner, Henry Moore, Henri Laurens, Alexander Calder, Raymond Duchamp-Villon, Constantin Brâncuși, John Ferren, Jean Arp, Max Ernst, Pablo Picasso, Georges Braque, and Kurt Schwitters. She also greatly admired the work of John Tunnard (1900–1971) and is credited with his discovery in mainstream international modernism.

The Peggy Guggenheim Collection will present Peggy Guggenheim in London: The Making of a Collector, the first large-scale museum exhibition celebrating Guggenheim and Guggenheim Jeune. During this period (January 1938 through June 1939), Guggenheim promoted artists several local and international artists. “The exhibition sheds light on a crucial period that contributed to defining Peggy Guggenheim as a collector and patron, focusing on her network of influential friends—from Marcel Duchamp to Samuel Beckett and Mary Reynolds—who helped shape her vision.” The exhibit will be on display at the Peggy Guggenheim Collection (April 25–October 19, 2026) before traveling to the Royal Academy of Arts (November 21, 2026–March 14, 2027) and the Guggenheim New York (April 16, 2027–September 12, 2027). The catalog was edited by the exhibition’s curators Gražina Subelytė and Simon Grant.

== Plans for a museum ==
When Guggenheim realized that her gallery, although well received, had suffered a loss of £600 in the first year, she decided to spend her money in a more practical way. A museum for contemporary arts was exactly the institution she could envision supporting. Most certainly influencing her were the adventures in Manhattan of her uncle, Solomon R. Guggenheim, who, with the help and encouragement of artist Baroness Hilla von Rebay, had created the Solomon R. Guggenheim Foundation two years earlier. The main aim of that foundation had been to collect and to further the production of abstract art, resulting in the opening of the Museum of Non-Objective Painting (known after 1952 as the Solomon R. Guggenheim Museum) during 1939. Guggenheim closed Guggenheim Jeune with a farewell party on 22 June 1939, at which colour portrait photographs by Gisèle Freund were projected onto the walls. Together with the English art historian and art critic Herbert Read, she started making plans for a Museum of Modern Art in London. She set aside $40,000 for its operating expenses, however, these funds were soon overstretched by the ambitions of the organizers.

In August 1939, Guggenheim left for Paris to negotiate loans of artworks for the first exhibition. In her luggage was a list drawn up by Herbert Read for this occasion. Shortly after her departure the Second World War broke out, and the events following 1 September 1939 made her abandon the scheme, willingly or not. She then "decided now to buy paintings by all the painters who were on Herbert Read's list. Having plenty of time and all the museum's funds at my disposal, I put myself on a regime to buy one picture a day." When finished, she had acquired ten Picassos, forty Ernsts, eight Mirós, four Magrittes, four Ferrens, three Man Rays, three Dalís, one Klee, one Wolfgang Paalen, and one Chagall, among others. In the meantime, she had made new plans and, in April 1940, had rented a large space in the Place Vendôme as a new home for her museum.

Guggenheim had to abandon her plans for a Paris museum a few days before the Germans reached Paris and she fled to the south of France, from where, after months of safeguarding her collection and artist friends, she left Europe for Manhattan in the summer of 1941. There, in the following year, she opened a new gallery—which was partially a museum—at 30 West 57th Street. It was entitled The Art of This Century. Three of its four galleries were dedicated to Cubist and Abstract art, Surrealism, and Kinetic art, with only the fourth, the front room, being a commercial gallery. Guggenheim held other important shows — such as the Exhibition by 31 Women, the first documented all-women art exhibition in the United States of America — at the gallery. This 1943 month-long exhibition gathered together artists ranging from notable figures such as Frida Kahlo, Gypsy Rose Lee, Meret Oppenheim, Leonora Carrington, and Louise Nevelson, to others who were unknown artists in New York. In 2023, art collector Jenna Segal curated The 31 Women Collection, based on the 1943 exhibition. Taking place at Segal's office, the same location as Peggy Guggenheim's Art of This Century Gallery, the exhibition lasted for 31 hours spread out during May 15 to May 21. Aiming to "sharpie women into history", Segal set out to collect works by every artist shown in the original exhibition so that their art could be shared with the world. As of May 2023, 143 works by 30 of the 31 women have been acquired. At the 2023 exhibition, one work per artist was displayed to the public.

Guggenheim's interest in contemporary art was instrumental in advancing the careers of several important modern artists, including the American painters Jackson Pollock and William Congdon, the Austrian surrealist Wolfgang Paalen, the sound poet Ada Verdun Howell, and the German painter Max Ernst, whom she married in December 1941. She had assembled her collection in only seven years.

== Collection, after World War II ==
Following World War II and her 1946 divorce from Max Ernst, she closed The Art of This Century Gallery in 1947 and returned to Europe, deciding to live in Venice, Italy. In 1948, she was invited to exhibit her collection in the disused Greek Pavilion of the Venice Biennale. In 1949, she established her collection in the Palazzo Venier dei Leoni ('Palazzo Venier of the lions') on the Grand Canal.

Her collection became one of the few European collections of modern art to promote a significant number of works by Americans. She became acquainted with painter and sculptor Edward Melcarth, a fellow American hailing from Louisville, Kentucky. Melcarth, known for his figurative paintings and eroticized depictions of the male body, designed Peggy a pair of hand-sculpted bat sunglasses, rising in ranks amongst Guggenheim’s Tanguy earrings and Calder jewelry as the late collector’s signature accessory. In the 1950s she promoted the art of two local painters, Edmondo Bacci and Tancredi Parmeggiani. By the early 1960s, Guggenheim had almost stopped collecting art and began to concentrate on presenting what she owned. She loaned out her collection to museums in Europe and in 1969 to the Solomon R. Guggenheim Museum in Manhattan, which was named after her uncle. Eventually, she decided to donate her home and her collection to the Solomon R. Guggenheim Foundation, a gift that was concluded inter vivos in 1976, before her death in 1979.

The Peggy Guggenheim Collection is one of the most important museums in Italy for European and American art of the first half of the twentieth century. Works in her collection embrace Cubism, Surrealism, and abstract expressionism.

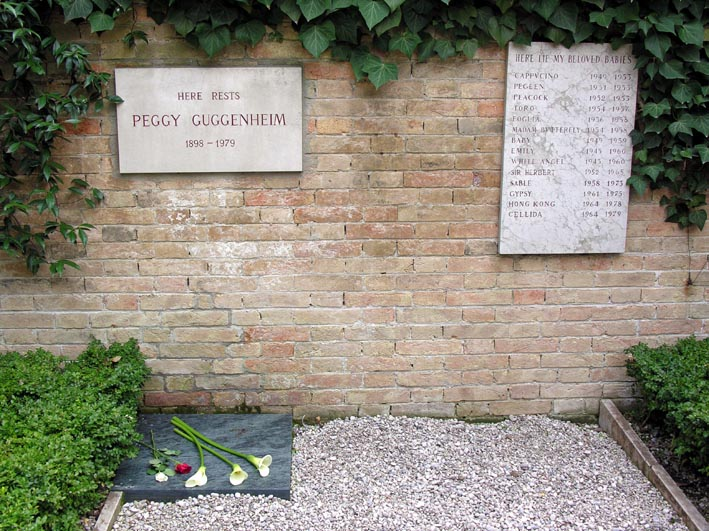
Guggenheim's grave with a plaque remembering her Lhasa Apsos dogs

Guggenheim lived in Venice until her death in Camposampiero near Padua, Italy, following a stroke. Her ashes are interred next to her dogs in the garden of her home, the Palazzo Venier dei Leoni. Later it was renamed as the Nasher Sculpture Garden in the Peggy Guggenheim Collection.

== Personal life ==
According to both Guggenheim and her biographer Anton Gill, while she was living in Europe, she "slept with 1,000 men." She claimed to have had affairs with numerous artists and writers, and many artists and others have claimed to have had affairs with her. When asked by conductor Thomas Schippers how many husbands she had had, she replied, "You mean my own, or other people's?" In her autobiography, Peggy provided the names of some of those lovers, including Yves Tanguy, Roland Penrose, and E. L. T. Mesens.

Her first marriage was to Laurence Vail, a Dada sculptor and writer, with whom she had two children, Michael Cedric Sindbad Vail (1923–1986) and Pegeen Vail Guggenheim (1925–1967). They divorced circa 1928, following his affair with writer Kay Boyle, whom he later married. Soon after her first marriage dissolved, she had an affair with John Ferrar Holms, a war hero and writer, who struggled with writer's block. She then lived with the writer and Communist activist Douglas Garman for several years. Starting in December 1939, she and Samuel Beckett had a brief, but intense affair, and he encouraged her to turn exclusively to modern art. She married her second husband, artist Max Ernst, in 1941 and divorced him in 1946. Among her eight grandchildren is Karole Vail, who was appointed director of the Peggy Guggenheim Collection in 2017.

== In popular culture ==
- Guggenheim was portrayed by Amy Madigan in the movie Pollock (2000), directed by and starring Ed Harris, based on the life of Jackson Pollock.
- A play by Lanie Robertson based on Guggenheim's life, Woman Before a Glass, opened at the Promenade Theatre on Broadway, New York on March 10, 2005. This one-woman show focuses on Guggenheim's later life. Mercedes Ruehl played Guggenheim and received an Obie Award for her performance. In May 2011, the Abingdon Theater Arts Complex in New York featured a revival of the play, starring veteran stage actress Judy Rosenblatt, directed by Austin Pendleton.
- In Bethan Roberts' first play for radio, My Own Private Gondolier, Guggenheim's troubled daughter, Pegeen, leaves her three children behind when she travels to Venice to spend the summer with her mother. The play was first broadcast on BBC Radio 4 on October 19, 2010; Guggenheim was played by Fiona Shaw; Pegeen was played by Hattie Morahan.
- In April 2015, a new documentary film, Peggy Guggenheim: Art Addict, began premiering at film festivals, including the San Francisco Jewish Film Festival on July 26, 2015.
- Guggenheim was portrayed by Jodhi May in the 2023 Netflix television series Transatlantic.
- Peggy: A Novel by Rebecca Godfrey with Leslie Jamison was published in 2024.
- Guggenheim appears as a character in Lucy Steeds' 2025 novel, "The Artist".
- In January 2026, alternative rock band They Might Be Giants released "Peggy Guggenheim" as part of their EP titled Eyeball.
