= Palazzo Venier dei Leoni =

Unfinished (but occupied) palace in Venice, Italy

- Italian: Palazzo Venier dei Leoni
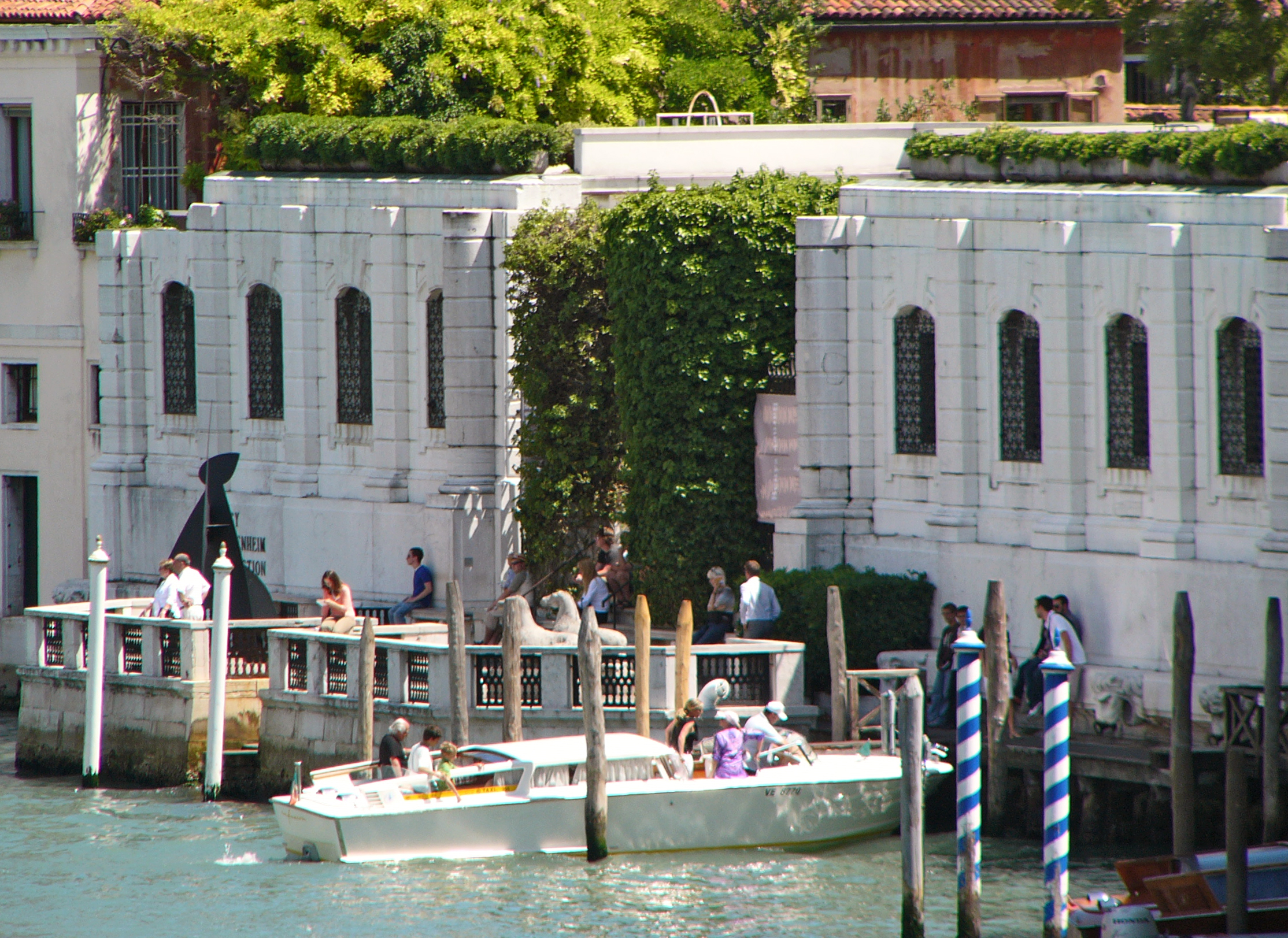
- Interactive map of the Palazzo Venier dei Leoni area

General information
- Location: Venice, Italy, Dorsoduro 701, I-30123 Venice
- Coordinates: 45°25′50″N 12°19′53″E
- Completed: 18th century

Design and construction
- Architect: Lorenzo Boschetti

Palazzo Venier dei Leoni (Italian: Palazzo Venier dei Leoni) is an unfinished palace in Venice, Italy, located in the Dorsoduro district on the Grand Canal, near the Santa Maria della Salute basilica. The palazzo houses the Peggy Guggenheim Collection.

== History ==
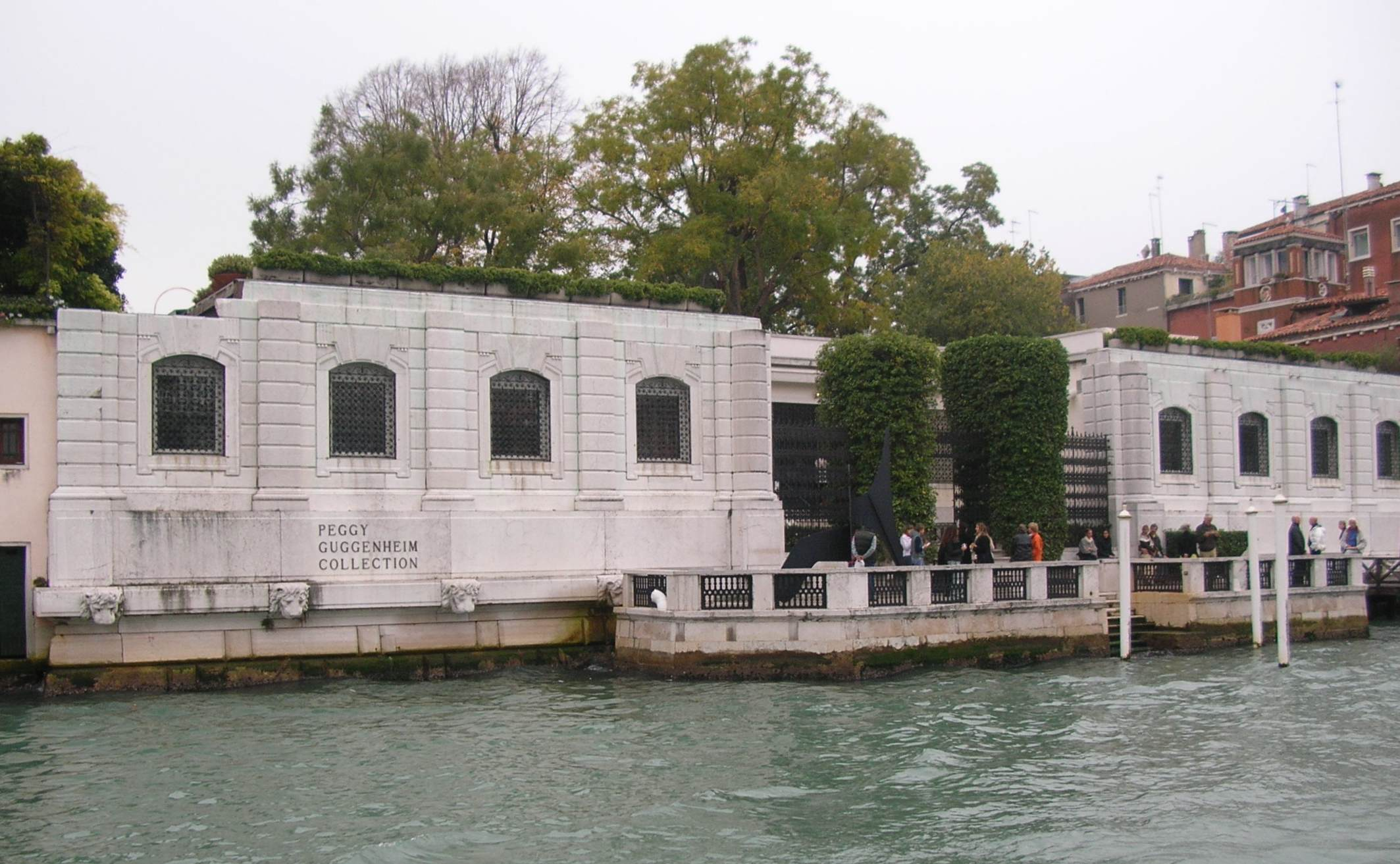
Palazzo Venier dei Leoni

The palazzo was designed in 1749 by architect Lorenzo Boschetti (author of the facade of the church San Barnaba) for the Venier family. The project envisioned a building that would combine the styles of Palladio and Longhena, two architects who left a significant legacy in Venice. However, the ambitious project remained unfinished: the Venier family's financial problems led to the construction of only part of the first floor of the palazzo.

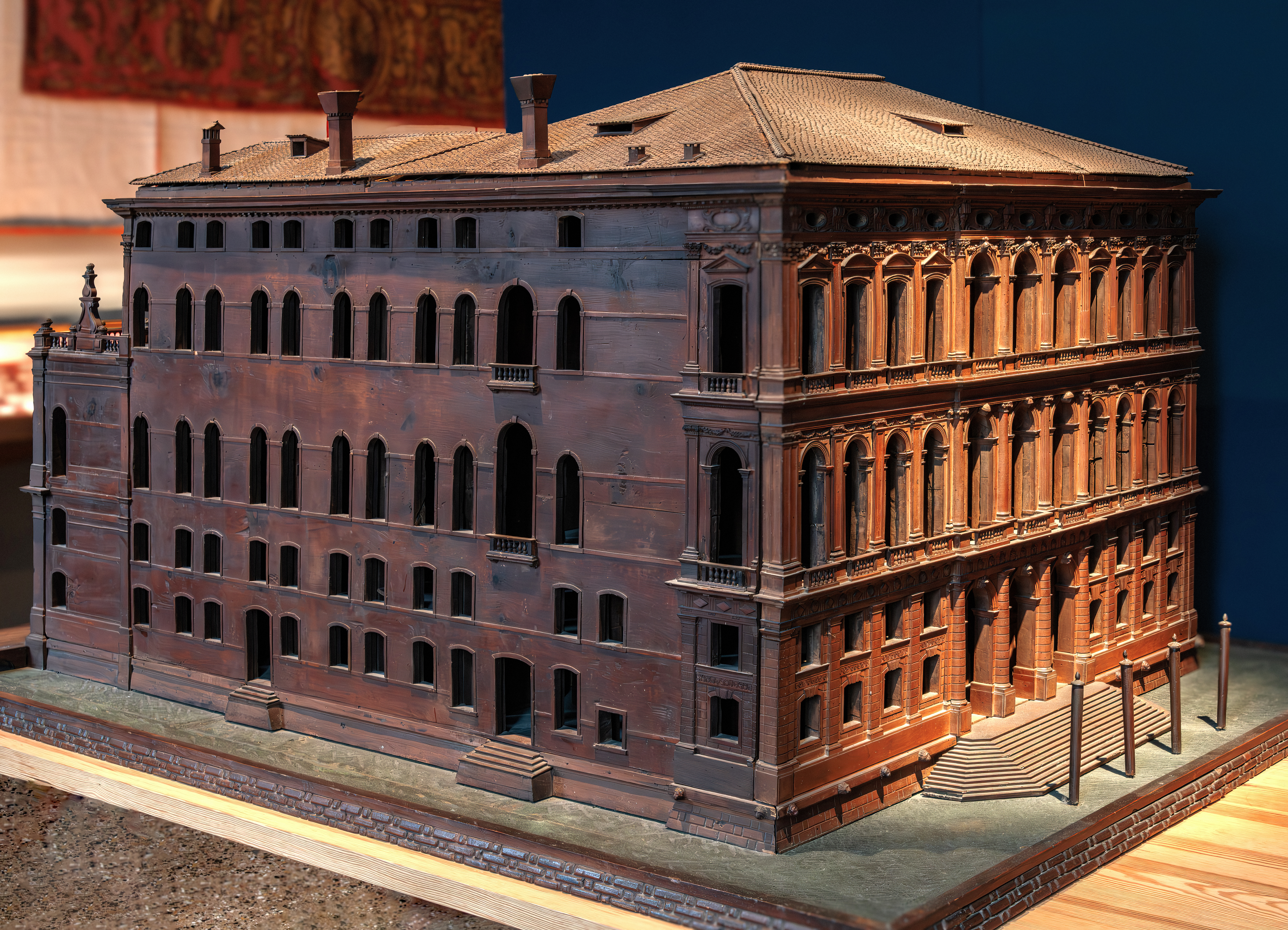
Large wooden model of Palazzo Venier dei Leoni – Museo Correr

In the Correr Museum, one can see a wooden model of what the completed palazzo would have looked like. There are two theories regarding the building's incompleteness: according to one, the influential Corner family, who owned the eponymous palazzo located opposite, on the other side of the canal, feared that their palazzo would be overshadowed and ensured that the building was not completed; according to another theory, the Venier family heirs, fulfilling their late father's will, which mandated the construction of a new palazzo but lacking the funds to complete it, started the construction as the will required but left it unfinished.

In 1910, Luisa Casati moved into the palazzo but was forced to sell it in 1924 due to financial problems.

In 1948, Peggy Guggenheim purchased the palazzo, which became not only her Venetian home but also the venue for her small but valuable collection of modern art.

The reason for the presence of the word "leoni" (lions) in the palazzo's name is unknown, but it is likely related to the sculptural elements depicting lions along the base of the facade. Another theory suggests that the Veniers kept a lion in the garden.

== Architecture ==
The building is a single-story, unfinished structure with a rusticated facade made of Istrian stone. The facade, facing the Grand Canal, features eight monoforas under which are mascarons in the form of lion heads. At the center of the facade is an entrance, consisting of a niche with a gate leading to a broad terrace that offers a view of the Grand Canal from the Academy Bridge to Piazza San Marco. Inside the palazzo is the Peggy Guggenheim collection, which includes works by artists such as Picasso, Kandinsky, Magritte, Pollock, and also features the original furniture from Peggy Guggenheim's bedroom. Behind the palazzo is a small garden where Peggy Guggenheim's ashes rest alongside those of her Lhasa Apso dogs.

== See also ==
- Peggy Guggenheim Collection
- List of palaces in Venice

== Literature ==
- AA.VV., Guida ai misteri e segreti di Venezia e del Veneto, Milano, Sugar Editore, 1970.
- Marcello Brusegan La grande guida dei monumenti di Venezia. Rome, Newton & Compton, 2005. ISBN 88-541-0475-2.
- Guida d’Italia — Venezia. 3 Editore. Milano, Touring Editore, 2007. ISBN 978-88-365-4347-2.
