= Peggy Guggenheim Collection =

Art museum in Venice

Coordinates: 45°25′50″N 12°19′52″E

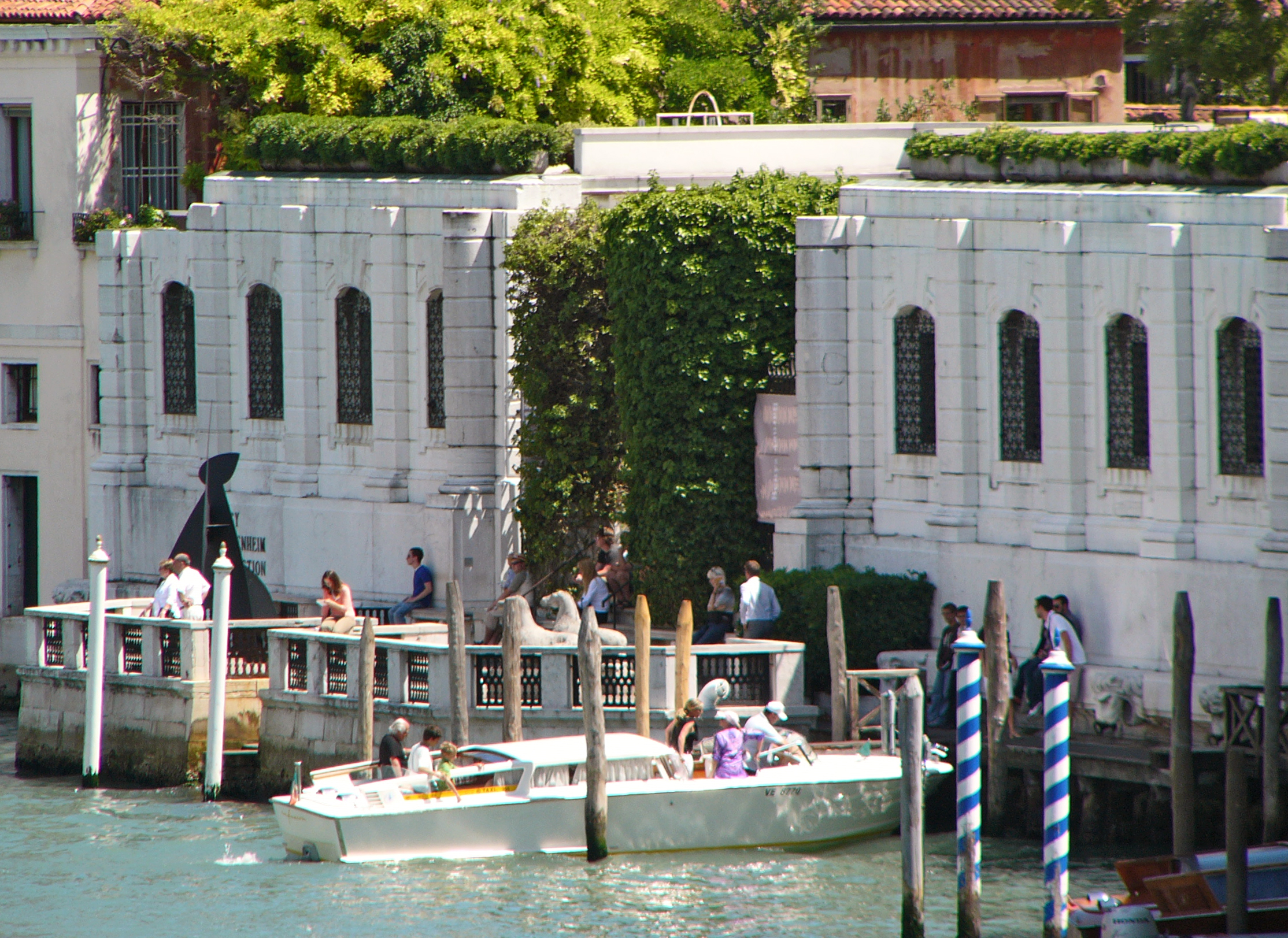
The Peggy Guggenheim museum as seen from the Grand Canal

The Peggy Guggenheim Collection is an art museum on the Grand Canal in the Dorsoduro sestiere of Venice, Italy. It is one of the most visited attractions in Venice. The collection is housed in the Palazzo Venier dei Leoni, an 18th-century palace, which was the home of the American heiress Peggy Guggenheim for three decades. She began displaying her private collection of modern artworks to the public seasonally in 1951. After her death in 1979, it passed to the Solomon R. Guggenheim Foundation, which opened the collection year-round from 1980.

The collection includes works of prominent Italian futurists and American modernists working in such genres as Cubism, Surrealism and abstract expressionism. It also includes sculptural works. In 2017, Karole Vail, a granddaughter of Peggy Guggenheim, was appointed the director of the collection, succeeding Philip Rylands, who led the museum for 37 years.

== Collection ==
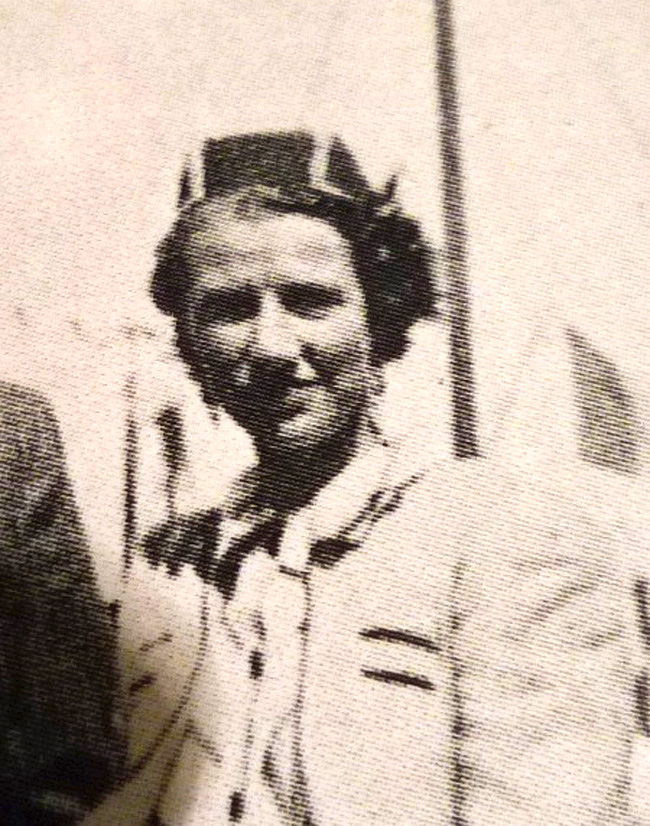
Peggy Guggenheim, Marseille, 1937

The collection is principally based on the personal art collection of Peggy Guggenheim, a former wife of artist Max Ernst and a niece of the mining magnate, Solomon R. Guggenheim. She collected the artworks mostly between 1938 and 1946, buying works in Europe "in dizzying succession" as World War II began, and later in America, where she discovered the talent of Jackson Pollock, among others. The museum "houses an impressive selection of modern art. Its picturesque setting and well-respected collection attract some 400,000 visitors per year", making it "the most-visited site in Venice after the Doge's Palace". Works on display include those of prominent Italian futurists and American modernists. Pieces in the collection embrace Cubism, Surrealism and abstract expressionism. During Peggy Guggenheim's 30-year residence in Venice, her collection was seen at her home in the Palazzo Venier dei Leoni and at special exhibitions in Amsterdam (1950), Zürich (1951), London (1964), Stockholm (1966), Copenhagen (1966), New York (1969) and Paris (1974).

Among the artists represented in the collection are: from Italy, Giorgio de Chirico (The Red Tower, The Nostalgia of the Poet) and Gino Severini (Sea Dancer); from France, Georges Braque (The Clarinet), Jean Metzinger (Au Vélodrome), Albert Gleizes (Woman with Animals), Marcel Duchamp (Sad Young Man on a Train), Fernand Léger (Study of a Nude and Men in the City (Note: A third work that Guggenheim had purchased was never exhibited, as it was suspected to be a fraud. In February 2014, researchers concluded that the piece was a fake after "they detected faint signatures of Cold war-era nuclear bombs in the canvas that reveal the painting was created after Léger's death" in 1959.)), Francis Picabia (Very Rare Picture on Earth); from Spain, Salvador Dalí (Birth of Liquid Desires), Joan Miró (Seated Woman II) and Pablo Picasso (The Poet, On the Beach); from other European countries, Constantin Brâncuși (including a sculpture from the Bird in Space series), Max Ernst (The Kiss, Attirement of the Bride), Alberto Giacometti (Woman with Her Throat Cut, Woman Walking), Arshile Gorky (Untitled), Wassily Kandinsky (Landscape with Red Spots, No. 2, White Cross), Paul Klee (Magic Garden), René Magritte (Empire of Light) and Piet Mondrian (Composition No. 1 with Grey and Red 1938, Composition with Red 1939); and from the US, Alexander Calder (Arc of Petals) and Pollock (The Moon Woman, Alchemy). In one room, the museum also exhibits a few paintings by Peggy's daughter Pegeen Vail Guggenheim.

In addition to the permanent collection, the museum houses 26 works on long-term loan from the Gianni Mattioli Collection, including images of Italian futurism by artists including Umberto Boccioni (Materia, Dynamism of a Cyclist), Carlo Carrà (Interventionist Demonstration), Luigi Russolo (The Solidity of Fog) and Severini (Blue Dancer), as well as works by Giacomo Balla, Fortunato Depero, Ottone Rosai, Mario Sironi and Ardengo Soffici. In 2012, the museum received 83 works from the Rudolph and Hannelore Schulhof Collection, which has its own gallery within the building.

== Building and Venice Biennale ==
The collection is housed in the Palazzo Venier dei Leoni, which Peggy Guggenheim purchased in 1949. Although sometimes mistaken for a modern building, it is an 18th-century palace designed by the Venetian architect Lorenzo Boschetti. The building was unfinished, and has an unusually low elevation on the Grand Canal. The museum's website describes it thus:

Palazzo Venier dei Leoni's long low façade, made of Istrian stone and set off against the trees in the garden behind that soften its lines, forms a welcome "caesura" in the stately march of Grand Canal palaces from the Accademia to the Salute.

The palazzo was Peggy Guggenheim's home for thirty years. In 1951, the palazzo, its garden, now called the Nasher Sculpture Garden, and her art collection were opened to the public from April to October for viewing. Her collection at the palazzo remained open during the summers until her death in Camposampiero, northern Italy, in 1979; she had donated the palazzo and the 300-piece collection to the Solomon R. Guggenheim Foundation in 1976. The foundation, then under the direction of Peter Lawson-Johnston, took control of the palazzo and the collection in 1979 and re-opened the collection there in April 1980 as the Peggy Guggenheim Collection.

After the Foundation took control of the building in 1979, it took steps to expand gallery space; by 1985, "all of the rooms on the main floor had been converted into galleries ... the white Istrian stone facade and the unique canal terrace had been restored" and a protruding arcade wing, called the barchessa, had been rebuilt by architect Giorgio Bellavitis. Since 1985, the museum has been open year-round. In 1993, apartments adjacent to the museum were converted to a garden annex, a shop and more galleries. In 1995, the Nasher Sculpture Garden was completed, additional exhibition rooms were added, and a café was opened. A few years later, in 1999 and in 2000, the two neighboring properties were acquired. In 2003, a new entrance and booking office opened to cope with the increasing number of visitors, which reached 350,000 in 2007. Since 1993, the museum has doubled in size, from 2,000 to 4,000 square meters.

Since 1985, the United States has selected the foundation to operate the U.S. Pavilion of the Venice Biennale, an exhibition held every other summer. In 1986, the foundation purchased the Palladian-style pavilion, built in 1930.

== Management and attendance ==
Philip Rylands led the museum for 37 years after Peggy Guggenheim's death, until 2017. He was appointed the first director of the collection in 2000, and in 2017 he became director emeritus. In 2017, Peggy Guggenheim's granddaughter, Karole P. B. Vail, succeeded Rylands after having been a curator at the Solomon R. Guggenheim Museum in New York since 1997.

As of 2012, the collection was the most visited art gallery in Venice and the 11th most visited in Italy.

== Lawsuits ==
Since 1992, Peggy Guggenheim's grandson Sandro Rumney, together with his children and some cousins, have raised several disputes with the Solomon R. Guggenheim Foundation. The disputes concern, in part, the difference in language between Guggenheim's unconditional 1976 deed of gift to the foundation, a 1969 letter, and a 1972 version of her will. The courts have found the deed binding. In 1992, Rumney and two other grandsons sued the foundation in Paris. They claimed, among other things, that the modernization of the collection did not comply with the letter and spirit of her wishes. In 1994, the court dismissed the claims and ordered the grandsons to pay the foundation court costs.

Following the gift of approximately 80 works to the Solomon R. Guggenheim Foundation by Hannelore and Rudolph Schulhof (a former trustee of the foundation) in 2012, some works collected by Guggenheim were removed from the Palazzo to make room for the display of the new works. The Schulhofs' names were inscribed alongside Guggenheim's at both entrances of the museum. Their son, Michael P. Schulhof, has been a trustee of the Guggenheim foundation since 2009. In 2014, several French descendants of Peggy Guggenheim, led by Rumney, sued the foundation for violating her will and agreements with the foundation, which they said require that her collection "remain intact and on display". They also claimed that the resting place of her ashes in the gardens of the Palazzo has been desecrated by the display of sculptures nearby, among other things. The lawsuit requested that the founder's bequest be revoked or that the collections, gravesite and signage be restored. Other descendants of Peggy Guggenheim supported the foundation's position. In 2014, the court dismissed the claims and awarded the foundation legal fees. The court noted that the descendants had attended some of the parties held in the gardens by the foundation. In 2015, the Paris Court of Appeal dismissed the lawsuit and awarded the foundation additional legal fees. Rumney stated his intention to continue to appeal.

== Selected works ==
Pablo Picasso, 1911, The Poet (Le poète), oil on linen, 131.2 × 89.5 cm (51 5/8 × 35 1/4 in.)

Jean Metzinger, 1911–1912, Au Vélodrome, oil, sand and collage on canvas, 130.4 × 97.1 cm (51 1/2 x 38 1/4 in.)

Marcel Duchamp, 1911–1912, Nude (Study), Sad Young Man on a Train (Nu, esquisse, jeune homme triste dans un train), oil on cardboard mounted on Masonite, 100 x 73 cm (39 3/8 × 28 3/4 in.)

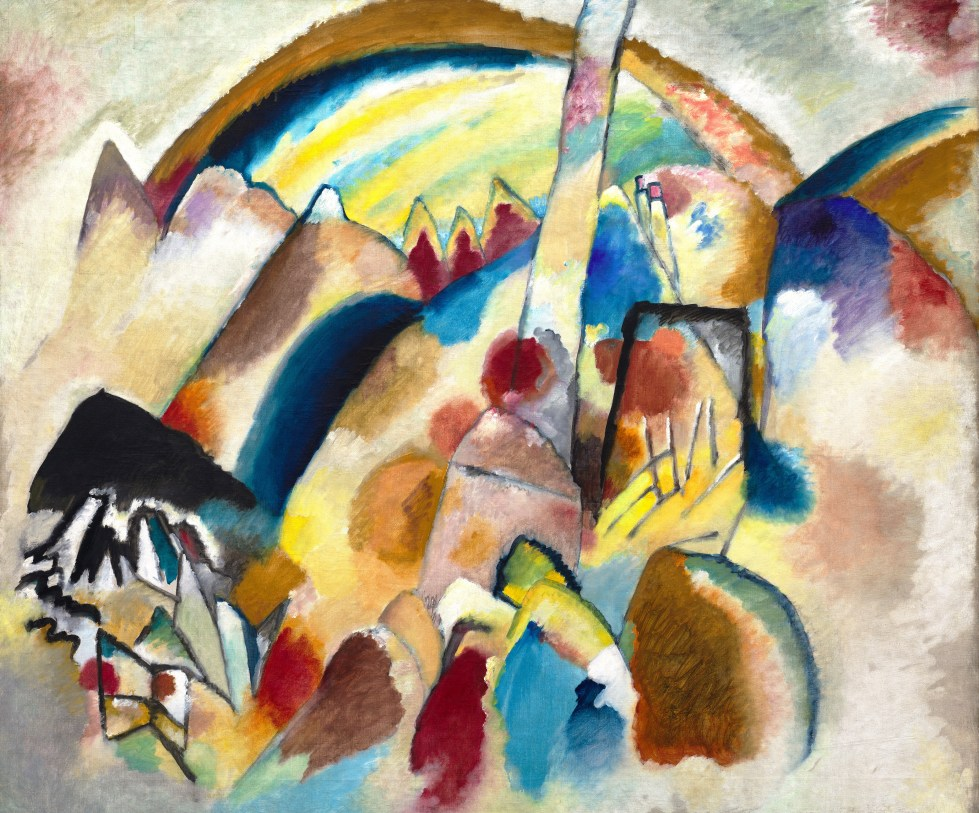
Wassily Kandinsky, 1913, Landscape with Red Spots No 2, oil on canvas, 117.5 x 140 cm

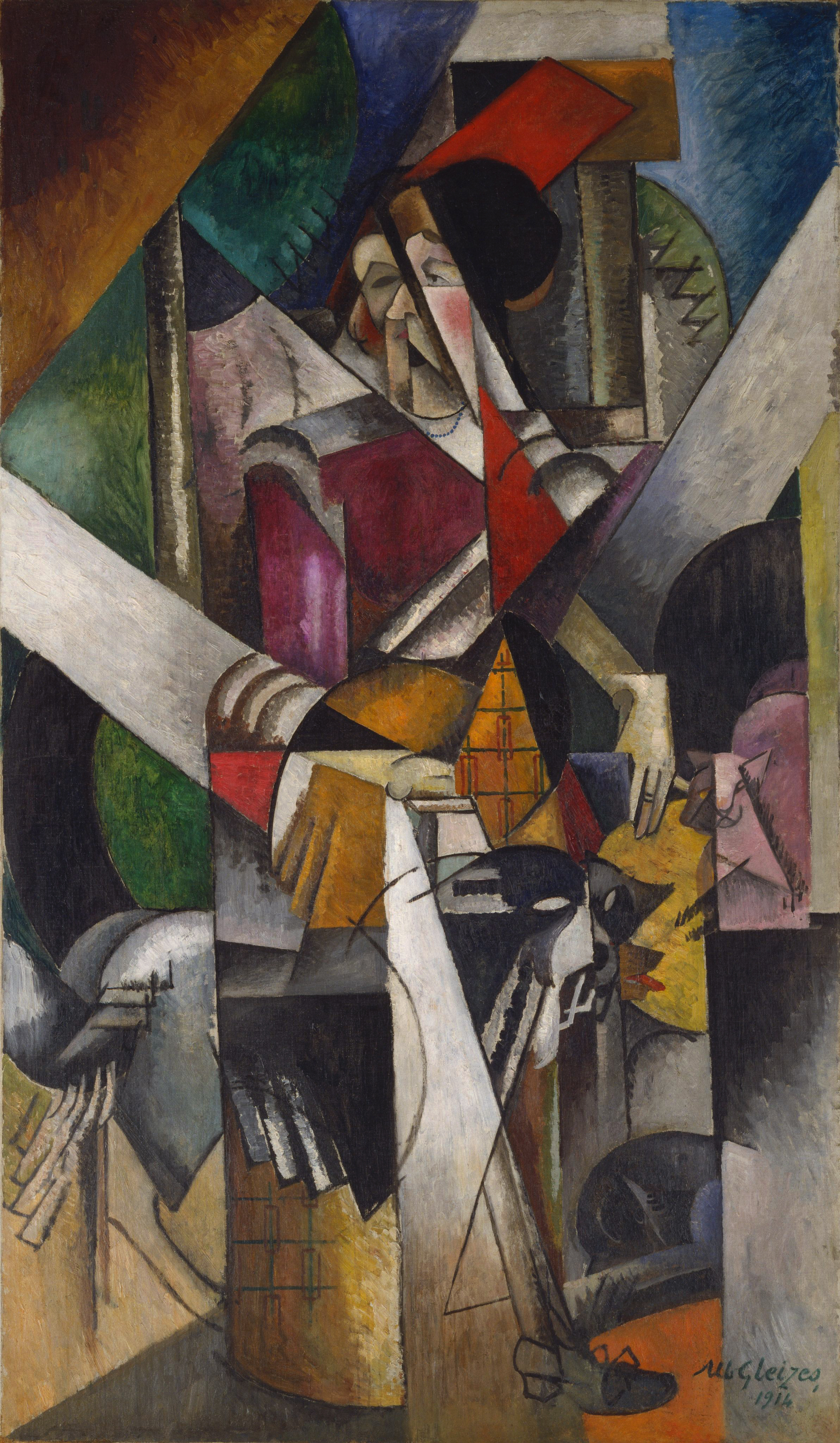
Albert Gleizes, 1914, Woman with Animals (La dame aux bêtes) Madame Raymond Duchamp-Villon, oil on canvas, 196.4 x 114.1 cm (77 5/16 x 45 15/16 in.)

== See also ==
- Art museums and galleries in Venice
- Dorsoduro−related topics
- Guggenheim family
- List of museums in Italy
- List of Guggenheim Museums

== Sources ==
- Decker, Darla (2008). Urban development, cultural clusters: The Guggenheim Museum and its global distribution strategies. New York: Dissertation Abstracts International. ISBN 978-0549745273.
- Lauritzen, Peter; Zielcke, Alexander (1978). Palaces of Venice. New York: Viking Press. ISBN 0670537241.
- Nicolini, Renato (1982). Introduction. Catalogue – Guggenheim Venezia-New York: sessanta opere, 1900–1950. By Thomas M. Messer. Milan: Electa.
- Tacou-Rumney, Laurence (1996). Peggy Guggenheim – a collector's album. Paris: Flammarion. ISBN 2080136100.
- Vail, Karole (1998). Peggy Guggenheim: A Celebration. New York: Guggenheim Museum. ISBN 0810969149.
