= Guggenheim (surname) =

Guggenheim is a surname, sometimes appearing as Gugenheim. Notable people with the name include:

== Guggenheim ==
- Guggenheim family, American family of Swiss Jewish ancestry
  - Meyer Guggenheim (1828–1905)
    - Daniel Guggenheim (1856–1930)
      - Harry Frank Guggenheim who privately funded Goddard's liquid fuel rocket research (1890–1971)
    - Solomon R. Guggenheim (1861–1949), philanthropist who established the Guggenheim museum
    - Benjamin Guggenheim (1865–1912)
      - Peggy Guggenheim (1898–1979)
    - Simon Guggenheim (1867–1941)
- Charles Guggenheim (1924–2002), American Academy Award-winning documentary film maker
- Davis Guggenheim (born 1963), American Academy Award-winning documentary film maker
- Edward A. Guggenheim (1901–1970), English chemist and academic noted for chemical thermodynamics
- Kurt Guggenheim (1896–1983), Swiss writer
- Marc Guggenheim (born 1970), American screenwriter
- Paul Guggenheim (1899–1977), Swiss scholar of international law
- Ralph Guggenheim (born 1951), American video graphics designer and businessman

== Gugenheim ==
- D.J. Gugenheim, American film producer known for The Brutalist
- Ernest Gugenheim (1916–1977), French rabbi
- Michel Gugenheim, became chief rabbi of France in 2013

== See also ==
- Guggenheim (disambiguation)
- Guggenheimer (surname)
