= Guggenheimer =

Guggenheimer is a surname of German and Jewish (Ashkenazic) origins, and it may refer to:

- Elinor Guggenheimer (1912–2008) American philanthropist, civic leader, and writer
- Heinrich Guggenheimer (1924–2021) German-born Swiss and American mathematician and educator
- Minnie Guggenheimer (1882–1966) American philanthropist
- Randolph Guggenheimer (1907–1999) American philanthropist, lawyer
- Randolph Guggenheimer (politician) (1846–1907), American businessman, acting mayor of New York City
- Tobias Guggenheimer (born 1953) Swiss and American architect, educator and author

== See also ==
- Guggenheim (surname)
