= Louis F. Rothschild =

American investment banker (1869–1957)

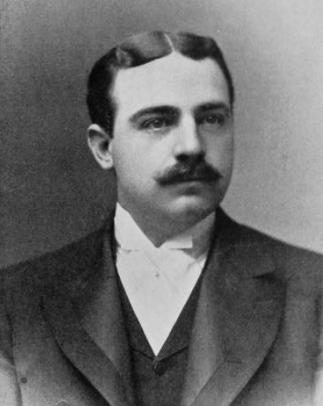
- Born: September 4, 1869; New York City, U.S.
- Died: June 15, 1957 (aged 87); New York City, U.S.
- Education: City College of New York; Columbia University; Columbia Law School
- Occupation: Investment banker
- Known for: Founding L.F. Rothschild
- Spouse: Cora Guggenheim (m. 1899; died 1956)
- Relatives: Simon F. Rothschild (brother); Meyer Guggenheim (father-in-law); Daniel Guggenheim (brother-in-law); Solomon Guggenheim (brother-in-law); Benjamin Guggenheim (brother-in-law); Simon Guggenheim (brother-in-law); William Guggenheim (brother-in-law)

Louis Frank Rothschild (September 4, 1869 – June 15, 1957) was an American investment banker and founder of the eponymous investment banking firm L.F. Rothschild.

== Biography ==
Rothschild was born on September 4, 1869, to Frank and Amanda (née Blun / Blün) Rothschild in New York City and he was not related to the Rothschild family of Europe. His brother was Simon F. Rothschild.

He was raised in a Jewish family and educated in public schools and received a B.S. from the City College of New York in 1889, a Ph.B. from Columbia University's School of Political Science (later became the Graduate School of Arts and Sciences) in 1890, and graduated from Columbia Law School in 1891. He practiced law from 1891 to 1893 and was engaged in manufacturing from 1893 to 1902.

He was a member of the New York Stock Exchange and founded L.F. Rothschild in 1899 with partner Leonard A. Hochstadter, formerly of the firm, Albert Loeb & Co. and their practice took up offices at 32 Broadway in New York City His firm concentrated on arbitrage.

== Philanthropy ==
He was involved in philanthropy and served as the treasurer of the Hospital for Joint Diseases (today part of NYU Langone Medical Center) for forty years.

== Personal life ==
Rothschild was married to Cora Guggenheim on January 3, 1899, daughter of Meyer Guggenheim, patriarch of the Guggenheim family, and the two had three children. He died on June 15, 1957.
