= Jamillah James =

American curator (born 1980)

Jamillah James (born 1980) is an American curator. She is the Manilow Senior Curator at the Museum of Contemporary Art Chicago.

== Early life and education ==
James grew up in New Jersey. Her mother was a musician. Her early interest in music and film provided one way into the world of visual art. James attended Columbia College Chicago, where she was in the first class to study art history. She graduated in 2005. While in Chicago for college, James founded a DIY, live/work experimental music venue called Pink Section and later lived at the exhibition space Archer Ballroom, where she organized live music performances.

== Career ==
James was an independent curator and held curatorial fellowships at the Studio Museum in Harlem (2012-2014) and the Queens Museum (2010).

James was Assistant Curator at the Hammer Museum. At the Hammer Museum she organized shows by Alex Da Corte, Simone Leigh, and Charles Gaines. She also curated Njideka Akunyili Crosby's first solo museum exhibition, and would later present Crosby at Art + Practice, a space founded by artist Mark Bradford.

In 2016, James was named curator at the Institute of Contemporary Art, Los Angeles. Upon her arrival she noted her plans to present a mixture of Los Angeles artists and international artists, and later described her goal of harnessing creative energy as a path to address a "turbulent political climate". For ICA LA James curated exhibitions featuring Sarah Cain, Harold Mendez, Nayland Blake, B. Wurtz, Sara Cwynar, Lucas Blalock, and Rebecca Morris. She also presented traveling exhibitions of Ree Morton, Patty Chang, and Nina Chanel Abney.

In 2018, James and Margot Norton were announced as curators of the New Museum's 2021 Triennial.

In 2021, she was appointed the Manilow Senior Curator at the Museum of Contemporary Art Chicago, and began her role in early 2022. During her tenure, she has organized the major group exhibition The Living End: Painting and Other Technologies, 1970-2020, and presented exhibitions of Faith Ringgold, Rebecca Morris, and Yoko Ono.

== Other activities ==
In 2019, James served on the jury that chose Kandis Williams for the Hammer Museum's $100,000 Mohn Award.

== Awards and honors ==
In 2018, James received a fellowship from the VIA Art Foundation. In 2021, James was awarded the Ellsworth Kelly Award from the Foundation for Contemporary Arts.; the Noah Davis Prize from the Underground Museum; and a curatorial fellowship from the Andy Warhol Foundation for the Visual Arts.
