= Peirce College =

Private college in Philadelphia, Pennsylvania, United States

Coordinates: 39.9455°N 75.1663°W

- Type: Private college
- Active: 1865–2026
- Location: 1608 Walnut Street, Suite 1900, Philadelphia, Pennsylvania, U.S.
- Campus: Urban
- Website: www.peirce.edu

Peirce College was a private college in Philadelphia, Pennsylvania, United States. It focused on adult education. It was announced in August 2024 that the school would be acquired by Lackawanna College with the merger being completed on July 8, 2026.

== History ==
=== 19th century ===
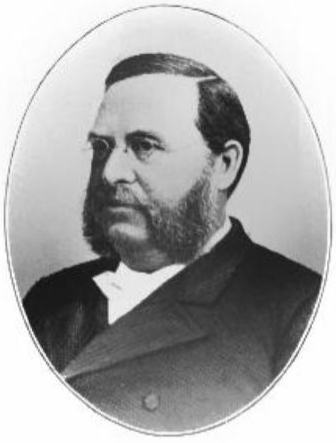
Thomas May Peirce, the Philadelphia educator who founded the college in 1865 and for whom it was named

In 1865, Thomas May Peirce, a Philadelphia educator, founded the Union Business College. The curriculum was designed to provide returning Civil War soldiers a business-focused education in anticipation of post-war business growth and expansion. Different from many colleges and universities of the era, Union was co-educational at its founding. Originally housed within Handel and Haydn Hall on Spring Garden Street, the college later moved to Chestnut Street.

=== 20th century ===
In 1915, Peirce moved to 1420 Pine Street where it would remain for 107 years.

In 1917, the school was renamed the Peirce School of Business Administration.

In 1964, Peirce School was renamed Peirce Junior College as it received approval to grant associate degrees. In 1997, the college was approved to grant Bachelor of Science degrees and was renamed Peirce College.

=== 21st century ===
In 2000, the college began offering online courses.

The Pine Street facilities have twice been awarded the General Building Contractors Association's Best Institutional Project in the under $5 million category; in 2001 for improvements made to College Hall, and in 2011 for the new library.

In September 2022, after 107 years at 1420 Pine Street, the college announced it was moving its main campus to the 19th Floor of 1608 Walnut Street.

In August 2024, Peirce announced plans to merge with Lackawanna College in Scranton due to declining enrollments. The merger was finalized on July 8, 2026.

== Academics ==
College Hall at Peirce College in October 2007

Peirce had undergraduate programs in Business, Healthcare, Information Technology, General Studies, and Paralegal Studies. The college offered graduate programs in Healthcare Administration and Organizational Leadership and Management.

Within the Business Administration degree, concentrations were offered in accounting, entrepreneurship/small business, human resource management, marketing, and real estate management. The Information Technology degree offered concentrations in desktop applications for business, information security, network administration, network security, technology management, and programming and application development.

Peirce had specialized educational programs for those who wish to seek an accelerated education during the evening and weekend on campus, earn their degree online, or earn their degree while at work (The Peirce Corporate College). Most courses were in an accelerated 7-week format, with some general education and paralegal courses following a standard 14-week format. Peirce used a 3 semester calendar (fall, spring and summer) with two 7-week courses or one 14-week course each semester.

The college was accredited by the Middle States Commission on Higher Education.

The School District of Philadelphia and Peirce had a partner program which provided an off-campus general studies degree program for parents with children enrolled in Philadelphia public schools.

== Notable alumni ==
- Charli Baltimore, Grammy-nominated American rapper and songwriter
- Clair Blank, author, Beverly Gray mystery series
- James A. Gallagher, former U.S. Congressman
- Benjamin Guggenheim, businessman and member of the Guggenheim family
- Simon Guggenheim, former U.S. Senator
- Arthur Seligman, former New Mexico governor
- Anastasio Somoza, former President of Nicaragua from 1936 to 1956
- Christine Tartaglione, Democratic member of the Pennsylvania State Senate
- Bill Tilden, former U.S. tennis champion
