= Guggenheim =

The Guggenheim is an abbreviation for any of the Guggenheim Museums, especially the one in New York City.

Guggenheim may also refer to:

== Other Buildings ==
- Guggenheim Building, in Rochester, Minnesota
- Murry Guggenheim House, also known as the Guggenheim Library of Monmouth University, Monmouth County, New Jersey

== Companies ==
- Guggenheim Baseball Management, the entity that purchased the Los Angeles Dodgers baseball team in 2012
- Guggenheim Exploration Company, notable for Beatty v. Guggenheim Exploration Co.
- Guggenheim Partners, a global financial services firm headquartered in New York City and Chicago

== Foundations ==
- Guggenheim Foundation (disambiguation), several current and past entities

== People ==
- Guggenheim (surname), including a list of notable people with the name (or the Gugenheim variant)
- Guggenheim family, a wealthy American family of Swiss Jewish ancestry who worked in the mining industry, including:
  - Solomon R. Guggenheim (1861–1949), who established a foundation that operates several museums
  - Peggy Guggenheim (1898–1979), who continued supporting museums

=== Fictional characters ===
- Crazy Guggenheim, a character played by Frank Fontaine in comedy sketches with Jackie Gleason starting in 1962
- Martin Guggenheim, a character in the Amazon Prime's 2014 video original Mozart in the Jungle

== Other uses ==
- "Guggenheim", a song on the 2012 album Sounds from Nowheresville by The Ting Tings
- Guggenheim, a variant of the word game Categories
- Guggenheim Fellowship, grants awarded annually by the John Simon Guggenheim Memorial Foundation since 1925
- Guggenheim International Award, awarded between 1956 and 1964 by the Solomon R. Guggenheim Foundation
- The Guggenheims: An American Epic, a 1978 non-fiction book by John H. Davis
