= Edmond Guggenheim =

Copper industry businessman and philanthropist

Edmond Alfred Guggenheim (January 19, 1888 – March 16, 1972) was an American copper industry businessman and philanthropist. He was a member of the Guggenheim family.

== Biography ==
Guggenheim was born on January 19, 1888, in Switzerland to Murry Guggenheim and Leonie Bernheim. His father was the third son of mining magnate Meyer Guggenheim and his mother was descended from a prominent Alsatian Jewish family. He received his B.A. from Columbia University in 1908 and a Ph.B. from Sheffield Scientific School of Yale University in 1911.

Guggenheim joined the family business in 1916 and headed its mining explorations and was its vice president in charge of South American operations. In 1961, Guggenheim retired as director of the Kennecott Copper Corporation and the Braden Copper Company.

In 1919, he was also named Special Deputy Police Commissioner of New York City in charge of The Bronx and severed on several commissions in the New York City Police Department. He was also a president of the Murry and Leonle Guggenheim Foundation from 1939 until his death.

== Personal life ==
Guggenheim died on March 13, 1972, in a Phoenix, Arizona hospital at age 84.

== Legacy ==
He is the namesake of Camp Guggenheim, a summer camp organized by the Roman Catholic Diocese of Ogdensburg, which is held annually on the Lower Saranac Lake property he owned from 1917 until 1963, when he donated it to the diocese. He donated the family's Long Island estate, Murry Guggenheim House, to Monmouth University in 1960. He also donated the land on which the Trudeau Institute in Saranac Lake, New York, is built.
