= Hazel Guggenheim McKinley =

American painter and art collector (1903–1995)

Hazel Guggenheim King-Farlow McKinley
- McKinley in a 1943 newspaper
- Born: Barbara Hazel Guggenheim; April 30, 1903; New York City, New York, U.S.
- Died: June 10, 1995 (aged 92); New Orleans, Louisiana, U.S.
- Occupation: Painter
- Spouses: Sigmund Marshall Kempner (m. 1921; div. 1922) Milton Waldman (m. 1923; div. 1930) Denys King-Farlow (m. 1931, divorced) Charles Everett McKinley, Jr. (m. 1940; died 1942) Archibald Butt Jr. (m. 1943, divorced) Larry Leonard (divorced) F. Keith Cole (m. 1952)
- Children: 4
- Parent(s): Benjamin Guggenheim; Florette Seligman
- Relatives: Peggy Guggenheim (sister)
- Family: Guggenheim

Hazel Guggenheim King-Farlow McKinley (born Barbara Hazel Guggenheim; April 30, 1903 – June 10, 1995) was an American painter, art collector, and art benefactor.

== Personal life ==
McKinley was born Barbara Hazel Guggenheim on April 30, 1903, in New York City to Benjamin Guggenheim and Fleurette (Seligman) Guggenheim. The marriage united two wealthy German-Jewish families. Born into the well-known Guggenheim family she grew up in New York, alongside her sisters Benita Guggenheim and Marguerite "Peggy" Guggenheim who would become the influential gallery proprietor, art collector, museum founder, and midwife to the Abstract Expressionism art movement. Her father Benjamin gave up much of his financial interest in the family's mining business to start his own business in Paris. With his business failing, in 1912 he set out to return to the United States in time for McKinley's ninth birthday on the Titanic. Following the shipwreck, he drowned aged 46; his body was not recovered. McKinley inherited $450,000. She later inherited money on the deaths of her mother, and of her older sister, Benita, who died in childbirth. The loss of her father haunted McKinley for the rest of her life, and in 1969 she recorded "In Memoriam, Titanic Lifeboat Blues."

McKinley studied at Washington Square College, New York University. In 1921, as an 18-year-old debutante, McKinley married banker Sigmund Marshall Kempner. She divorced Kempner a year later, and moved to Paris where she married journalist Milton S. Waldman in 1923. They had two sons, Terrence and Benjamin. During a visit to New York in 1928, Terrence and Benjamin both fell to their deaths from the rooftop of an apartment block. Speculation about the details of this tragic incident was largely kept hidden from the public by the Guggenheim family. At the time, McKinley was visiting her cousin who lived in the penthouse apartment. The fall was believed to be accidental, although McKinley "was unable to tell a coherent story of what happened". Two police investigations came to the conclusion that the deaths were accidental. However, within their social circle it was thought that she pushed the boys off the roof due to her deteriorating marriage. Two years after the death of their sons, McKinley and Waldman divorced. The mystery surrounding her sons' deaths left McKinley permanently stigmatized.

In 1931, McKinley married the Englishman Denys King-Farlow. They settled in Sussex, UK, and had two children, John King-Farlow, who became a philosopher and poet, and Barbara Benita King-Farlow, who became an artist.

After McKinley and King-Farlow divorced, the children lived with McKinley in the United States, before a custody fight was won by their father, King-Farlow, and the children moved back to England. While her marriage to King-Farlow did not last, McKinley continued to use his last name when signing her paintings.

McKinley (right) with Larry Leonard (left) in 1943

McKinley next married Charles (Chuck) Everett McKinley Jr on August 13, 1940. He was an artist and USAAF pilot. Chuck McKinley died in 1942 in a plane crash in a farmer's field in Missouri during stormy weather while moving planes for military training purposes. McKinley used the last name McKinley on all of her subsequent work until the end of her life, but went on to marry at least three times more. On October 1, 1943, McKinley married Army Corporal Larry Leonard in Denver, a former actor and athletic instructor. The wedding was announced in newspapers across the country, and much was made of the fact that the bride was 40 and the groom a 28-year-old and that the bride was marrying down in rank, with previous husbands being a major and a lieutenant. Her next marriage was recorded by a certificate of marriage in the Commonwealth of Virginia where the Hazel G. McKinley, age 49, married F. Keith Cole, age 28, listed as a T.V. projectionist, on July 7, 1952. In later newspaper accounts, she was listed as Mrs. Hazel Hayes, but details of this marriage are unknown.

In the late 1950s, McKinley moved back to Europe for a while, before returning to the United States in 1969. She lived in New Orleans until her death in 1995. On her death, her only living son, John King-Farlow, wrote a poem in his mother's honor, entitled "Eulogy For My Mother (Hazel Guggenheim McKinley, Artist)."

Hazel died on June 10, 1995, and her two remaining children scattered her ashes on the Mississippi River. A short obituary distributed by the Associated Press noted she was a member of the illustrious New York Guggenheim family, that she was determined to make a name for herself as an artist, that her art works were shown in museums in the United States and Europe, and were in the collections of such celebrities as Greer Garson, Benny Goodman, and Jason Robards, and that she had died of cancer at the age of 92.

== Painting and collecting career ==
McKinley began painting as a teenager and was a prolific artist throughout her life. When she fled New York for Paris at age 19 she studied at the Sorbonne and became part of 1920's bohemian Paris, where she was taught by key modernist artists of the time. Her primary mediums were ink, water color, tempera, and crayon.

Whilst living in the south of England with Denys King-Farlow in the 1930s, McKinley was influenced by a group of avant-garde artists, and had her first solo exhibition in London in April 1937 at the Coolings Gallery. She received instruction from artists Rowland Suddaby, Raymond Coxon, and Edna Ginesi, becoming associated with the London Group and the Euston Road School. She painted primarily in watercolor. Her work included still-life, portraits, townscapes and landscapes. Although her first work was done in a "slightly plain palette," her later work in the 1930s brightened, sometimes falling within the realm of fauvism. "Under the influence of the Surrealists, Hazel's paintings after the 1930's became freer, though her work was far more whimsical and humorous than many artists more closely associated with the movement."

In 1939 McKinley fled Europe due to the impending war and returned to the US, living mostly in California. She took brief art lessons from her sister Peggy's one-time husband Max Ernst and much later attended several summer schools taught by muralist and renowned teacher Xavier Gonzalez.

In her life in the United States and abroad, McKinley met many prominent artists of the Paris, London, and New York art scenes. She told a story about Jackson Pollock, one of her sister's Peggy's art proteges, "Peggy once left Pollock with me at the Chelsea Hotel, saying she could not take him to lunch with her. Pollock was so drunk, he vomited all over the carpet. . . Years later, the manager asked if I didn't have a Pollock to sell. I told him to cut himself a piece of the carpet."

McKinley continued to paint, and ran a small gallery of her own in the late 1950s and early 1960s in West Cornwall, Connecticut. One show at her gallery featured the works of British and Irish painters including Rowland Suddaby, Frank Beteson, Tom Nisbett, and Patrick Swift. McKinley showed two of her own works in the same exhibit, a watercolor painted at Positano, Italy and one painted at the Tuileries, Paris. Another featured work was a surrealistic water color portrait of McKinley by London artist Mervyn Peake.

McKinley exhibited her work both in Europe and the United States throughout her long career, mostly at smaller venues. An incomplete listing of her exhibits and museum acquisitions of her work include: Berkshire Museum, the Galerie Raymond Duncan in Paris, Stendahl Galleries, the Jake Zeitlin Gallery, the Montgomery Museum of Fine Art, the Artists' Own Gallery in London, the Manchester City Art Gallery, and Santa Fe Art Museum. Her work was both admired, and dismissed, by contemporary critics.

McKinley's work was only once included in a show by her sister Peggy. In 1943 McKinley was selected to exhibit a painting in Peggy's infamous show Exhibition by 31 Women in her New York gallery Art of This Century. The exhibition was radical at the time for being one of the first all-woman exhibitions, as well as showing only abstract or Surrealist works. In 1998 after her death, one of her paintings was exhibited in Peggy Guggenheim's Venice home/museum the Palazzo Venier dei Leioni.

While living in Europe in the 1960s, McKinley was mentioned in a Walter Winchell column as she gathered American theater people to help Italian flood survivors and also donated paintings for the effort. In her later life she settled in New Orleans, where she continued painting, exhibiting, and studying art into her eighties at Newcomb College, New Orleans. Towards the end of her life while confined to bed, her last works were colored pen drawings and sketches.

McKinley collected major contemporary artworks and she donated many of these works to public institutions. She donated over 15 works to Wakefield Art Gallery, UK, in the 1930s, and in 1938 presented the painting Cossacks (Cosaques) by Wassily Kandinsky to the Tate galleries. This became an important work within the Tate collection. She also donated to the Tate works by artists Edna Ginesi and Raymond Coxon. She also donated many paintings, some her own, to museums across the UK, including to municipal collections of English cities including Wakefield, Manchester and Leeds.

== Collections ==
Ferens Art Gallery

Lakeland Arts Trust

The Hepworth Wakefield

Leeds Museums and Galleries

Manchester Art Gallery

Bristol Museum & Art Gallery
