= Suddaby =

Suddaby is a surname. Notable people with the surname include:

- Elsie Suddaby (1893–1980), British lyric soprano
- Glenn T. Suddaby (born 1956), American judge
- Peter Suddaby (born 1947), English footballer
- Rowland Suddaby (1912–1972), British artist and illustrator
