= Louis Rothschild =

Louis Rothschild may refer to:

- Louis Nathaniel de Rothschild (1882–1955), Austrian baron
- Louis F. Rothschild (1869–1957), American investment banker and founder of investment banking firm L.F. Rothschild
- Georges Mandel (1885–1944), French journalist, politician, and French Resistance leader, born Louis George Rothschild
- Louis S. Rothschild (1900–1984), American investment banker
