= Charles S. Thomas =

American politician

Charles Thomas
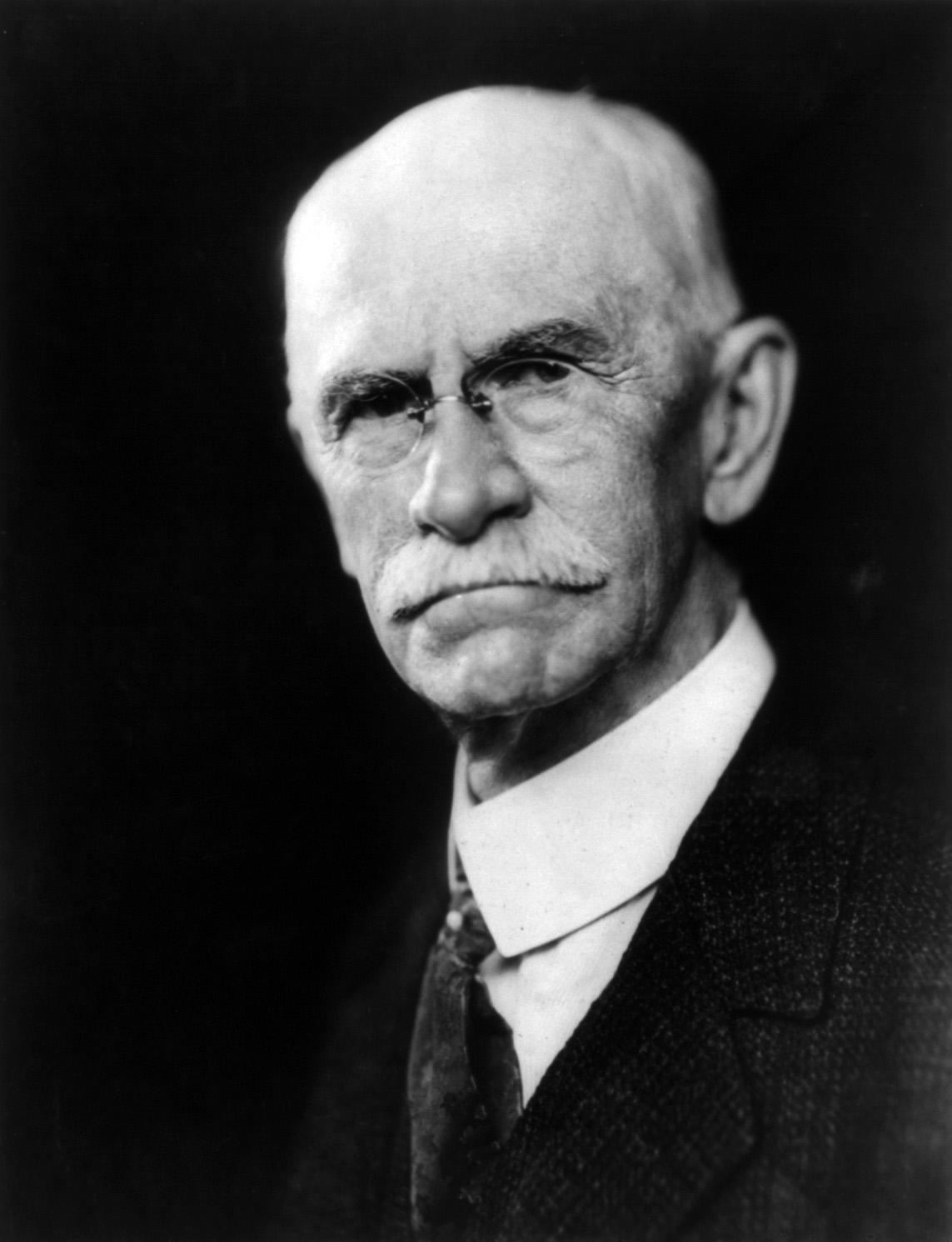

United States Senator from Colorado
- In office January 15, 1913 – March 3, 1921
- Preceded by: Charles J. Hughes Jr.
- Succeeded by: Samuel D. Nicholson

11th Governor of Colorado
- In office January 10, 1899 – January 8, 1901
- Lieutenant: Francis Patrick Carney
- Preceded by: Alva Adams
- Succeeded by: James B. Orman

Personal details
- Born: Charles Spalding Thomas; December 6, 1849 Darien, Georgia, U.S.
- Died: June 24, 1934 (aged 84) Denver, Colorado, U.S.
- Party: Democratic
- Spouse: Emma Gould Fletcher Thomas (1873)
- Children: 3
- Education: University of Michigan, Ann Arbor (LLB)

Military service
- Allegiance: Confederate States
- Branch/service: Confederate States Army
- Rank: Private
- Unit: Georgia State Militia
- Battles/wars: American Civil War

Charles Spalding Thomas (December 6, 1849 – June 24, 1934) was a Confederate soldier and later United States senator from Colorado. Born in Darien, Georgia, he attended private schools in Georgia and Connecticut, and served briefly in the Confederate Army.

== Biography ==
Thomas graduated from the law department of the University of Michigan at Ann Arbor in 1871, and was admitted to the bar the same year. He moved to Colorado and began to practice in Denver, where he was a city attorney in 1875 and 1876. He was a member of the Democratic National Committee from 1884 to 1896, and was an unsuccessful candidate for election to the United States House of Representatives in 1884, to the Senate in 1888 and 1895, and to the governorship in 1894.

Thomas served as the 11th governor of Colorado from 1899 to 1901. In 1897, Colorado had abolished the death penalty, but Thomas considered lynching an understandable substitute. In 1900, when a lynch mob murdered Calvin Kimblern, Thomas called it "a natural outburst of indignation of the people of Pueblo" and blamed the lack of a death penalty for the murder. Six months later, a mob surrounded Denver's jail seeking to lynch 15-year-old Preston Porter. Thomas was informed but declined to intervene. "As a matter of fact, hanging is too good for that man," he told reporters. The spirit of the lynch law is with the people, and will remain in them just as long as the Anglo-Saxon exists." After Porter was burned alive by a mob, when Thomas was asked to comment on the lynching, he said, "My opinion is that there is one less negro in the world." Colorado reinstated the death penalty soon thereafter.

In 1913, Thomas was elected as a Democrat to the United States Senate in 1912 to fill the vacancy caused by the death of Charles J. Hughes, Jr.; in 1914, he was narrowly reelected to a full term in the face of split opposition. Thomas served from January 15, 1913, to March 3, 1921, and was the last Confederate veteran to serve in the Senate. In 1920, he was an unsuccessful candidate for reelection as an independent due to his opposition to the League of Nations, receiving only 3% of the vote.

In the Sixty-third and Sixty-fourth Congresses, Thomas was chairman of the Committee on Woman Suffrage, and a member of the Committee on Coast Defenses (Sixty-fifth Congress) and the Committee on Pacific Railroads (Sixty-sixth Congress). He resumed the practice of law in Denver, where he died on June 24, 1934; his remains were cremated and his ashes were scattered in the mountains.

== Notes ==
Party political offices
Preceded by Joseph H. Maupin	Democratic nominee for Governor of Colorado; 1894	Succeeded by Alva Adams
Preceded by Alva Adams	Democratic nominee for Governor of Colorado; 1898	Succeeded by James Bradley Orman
Preceded by John W. Daniel	Keynote Speaker of the Democratic National Convention; 1900	Succeeded by John Sharp Williams
First	Democratic nominee for United States Senator from Colorado (Class 3); 1914	Succeeded by Tully Scott
Political offices
Preceded by Alva Adams	Governor of Colorado; 1899–1901	Succeeded by James B. Orman
U.S. Senate
Preceded by Charles J. Hughes Jr.	U.S. Senator (Class 3) from Colorado; 1913–1921; Served alongside: Simon Guggenheim, John F. Shafroth, Lawrence C. Phipps	Succeeded by Samuel D. Nicholson
