= Rebecca Morris =

- Born: Rebecca Morris; 1969 (age 56–57); Honolulu, Hawaii
- Education: MFA from The School of the Art Institute of Chicago, Skowhegan School of Painting and Sculpture, BA from Smith College
- Known for: Painting
- Awards: Joan Mitchell Foundation Fellowship (2024); California Community Foundation (2013); The City of Los Angeles, COLA Award (2013); Faculty Lecturer/Performer Award at Pasadena City College (2009); Guggenheim Fellowship (2008); The Durfee Foundation (2005); Tiffany Foundation (1999); Art Matters (1996).
- Website: www.rebeccamorris.net

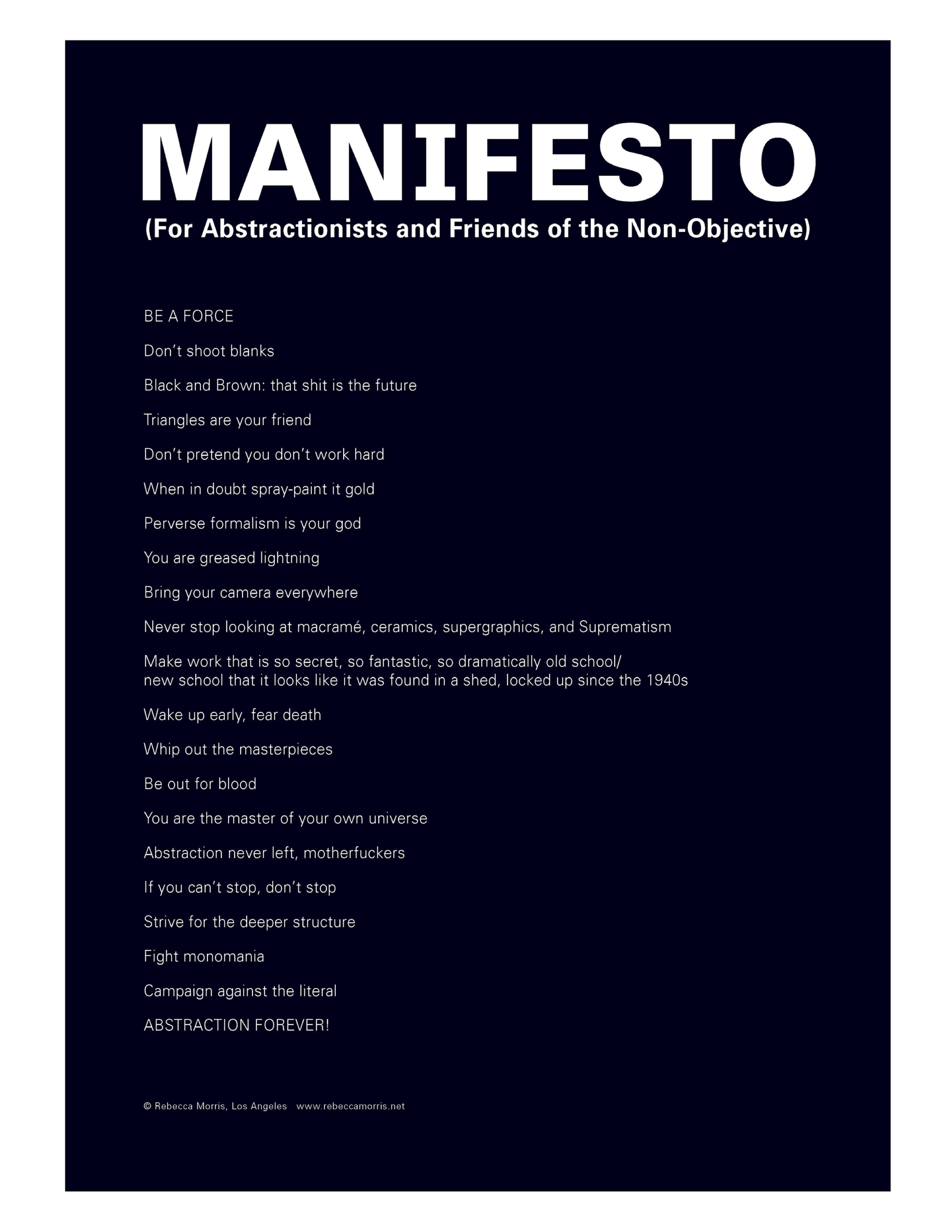
Rebecca Morris "Manifesto (For Abstractionists and Friends of the Non-Objective)" (2004) as published in Artforum

Rebecca Morris (born 1969 in Honolulu, Hawaii) is a contemporary American visual artist whose practice is known by its exploration of and rigorous commitment to abstract painting. Over the course of her thirty plus-year career, Morris has developed and returned to recurring motifs such as fragmented patternsand distorted grids to complicate her work against the larger history of artists that have used precise geometry to delineate visual space or convey specific philosophical concepts, such as Suprematism. While her work has been variously associated with the schools of Pattern and Decoration and Supports/Surfaces, Morris refuses the confinement of her practice to any one category or movement.

In 2004, Morris notably published her Manifesto (For Abstractionists and Friends of the Non-Objective) in Artforum in response to criticisms of abstraction.

Morris lives and works in Los Angeles and is currently Professor of Painting and Drawing and Acting Chair of the Department of Art at the University of California, Los Angeles. She was previously Professor of Painting and Drawing at Pasadena City College from 2000–2019. She has lectured at universities including Columbia University, Yale University, Bard College, the University of Southern California’s School of Fine Arts, the University of Chicago, and the School of the Art Institute of Chicago, where she served as a Distinguished Alumni Lecturer. She has also lectured at arts institutions including the Hammer Museum, Baffler Art Museum, the Museum of Contemporary Art Chicago, ICALA, and Anderson Ranch, among others.

== Early life and education ==
Morris was born in Honolulu, Hawaii and grew up in New Haven, Connecticut. She received her Bachelor of Arts in Studio Art from Smith College Northampton, Massachusetts in 1991. She received a Post Baccalaureate Studio Certificate from The School of the Art Institute of Chicago in 1992 and a Master in Fine Arts, Painting and Drawing from the same institution in 1994. Also in 1994, Morris attended the Skowhegan School of Painting and Sculpture in Skowhegan, Maine.

== Work ==
Through her paintings, Morris explores the idiosyncrasy and imperfection of the artist’s hand. "I was always interested in creating systems and plan-type drawings." she said in a 2014 interview. "As a child, I drew floor plans of split-level houses, and plans for cities and towns. I also drew imaginary family trees, which were based on a grid-like system, but they featured cat families instead of people families. I became interested in the grid again as an adult, when I was shifting from making realist paintings to abstract ones. Going back to the grid, seeing it as a kind of realistic thing, which had implications with the analytical, helped me." Morris avoids describing subject matter as she does not want to dictate what interpretations her painted forms may elicit. Some of her influences are the physical space of her studio, Raoul De Keyser, Joan Mitchell, James Meyer, and Terry Riley. Of her process Morris has stated "I am interested in how a large painting can create a physical experience of protection and containment. I think my oil paint to the transparency of watercolor and apply it to canvases as they lay flat on the floor. This method allows me to control the paint's liquidity, activating a quick and improvisational way of mark making."

The Whitney Museum of American Art specifically describes Morris's work as "Deeply invested in painting as a medium, her works are inspired by all underlying composition based on a gridded structure. On this foundation, Morris builds up her treatments to create pockets of expansiveness. Together these building blocks results in a completely personal language that Morris has developed, with a unique internal logic whose constituent parts are not always readily apparent."

Her artistic practice has been likened to Laura Owens's free sense of historical reference, as well as Frank Stella and Richard Tuttle.

== Awards ==
Morris is a recipient of awards and fellowships from Joan Mitchell Foundation Fellowship (2024), California Community Foundation (2013), Individual Visual Artist Fellowship from the Department of Cultural Affairs from the City of Los Angeles (2013), The Durfee Foundation (2005), Djerassi Artists Residency Program (2005), Guggenheim Foundation (2008), The Louis Comfort Tiffany Foundation (1999), and Art Matters (1996), among others.

== Exhibitions ==
A traveling survey of the artist's work entitled Rebecca Morris: 2001–2022 curated by Jamilah James was exhibited at the Institute of Contemporary Art, Los Angeles (October 1, 2022–January 15, 2023) and the Museum of Contemporary Art Chicago (September 30, 2023–April 7, 2024). Other solo exhibitions have been held at the Blaffer Art Museum at the University of Houston (2019); Bonnefanten Museum, Maastricht, Holland (2014); The Renaissance Society with her self titled show Rebecca Morris Paintings 1996-2005 (2005) and 356 Mission Rd. and LAXART in Los Angeles.

Morris has exhibited at 2014 Whitney Biennial (New York), The Renaissance Society at the University of Chicago, Made in LA, Hammer Museum, The Kunstmuseum St. Gallen (Switzerland), Friedrich Petzel (New York), The Hessel Art Museum (New York), The Museum of Contemporary Art (Chicago), Santa Monica Museum of Art, Night Gallery (Los Angeles), and Mary Boone in New York. Morris is represented by Regen Projects, Los Angeles; Bortolami, New York; Corbett vs. Dempsey, Chicago; and Trautwein Herleth, Berlin, Germany.
