= Lynching of Preston Porter Jr. =

1900 murder in Limon, Colorado, United States

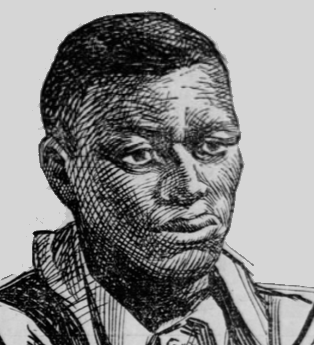
- A sketch of Porter published in The San Francisco Call the day after the lynching
- Location: near Limon, Colorado, U.S.
- Date: November 16, 1900; 125 years ago 6:23 p.m. – c. 6:43 p.m. (MST)
- Target: Preston John Porter Jr.
- Attack type: Lynching (burned at the stake)

Preston John Porter Jr. (April 25, 1885 – November 16, 1900) was a black boy who was abducted and lynched by a mob near Limon, Colorado, United States. Porter had arrived in Colorado from Lawrence, Kansas, with his father and brother in 1900; the three were in Denver on November 11, 1900, when they were stopped, questioned, and arrested on suspicion of the murder of an 11-year-old white girl which had taken place eight days prior. After four days of torture in a sweatbox, the authorities got Porter to confess and transported him by train to the county jail in Hugo, Colorado, despite numerous publications predicting that the train would be stopped and Porter lynched. As predicted, a mob abducted Porter in Limon; several hours later, they chained him to a steel rail and burned him alive. There were no charges brought against any of the participants, and nobody was ever held accountable for the lynching.

== Background ==
Preston John Porter Jr. was born in Hamilton County, Ohio, on April 25, 1885. He was commonly called by his middle name, John, to avoid confusion with his father, and several contemporary reports of the lynching refer to him that way. (Note: This article uses his first name, Preston, to reflect its near-exclusive use among modern sources.) He was living in Lawrence, Kansas, in 1900, when he traveled to Colorado with his father, Preston Sr., and brother, Arthur, to work in railroad construction. He was 15 years old at the time. (Note: A 2018 article published by Colorado Public Radio incorrectly claims Porter was 16 years old at the time of his death.)

== Initial incident and arrest ==
On the evening of November 8, 1900, an 11-year-old white girl named Louise Frost was found unconscious in a patch of weeds near Limon, Colorado, roughly 0.5 miles (0.8 km) from her father's house. (Note: A 2024 article published by Sentinel Colorado claims that Louise was 12 years old.) She had sustained fourteen stab wounds, apparently from a dirk, and a skull fracture; she had also been raped. She did not regain consciousness before dying at her home sometime around midnight on November 9. Louise was the daughter and only living child of Richard W. Frost, a rancher; the consensus among reports from the time was that she had been attacked on her way home from school. Louise was thought to have been lured from her buggy and attacked by someone familiar to her.

A railroad worker named Fred Schum was the sole eyewitness to Louise's murder. He recounted all of the girl's actions that afternoon and positively identified her in the field, though he could not provide any description of the second person he saw with Louise while watching from 50 yards (46 m) away. Schum reported that Louise did not scream during the attack, though he admitted that in the moment he was unable to determine whether she was being attacked or was simply playing with the other person. The buggy continued on without either person and arrived at the Frost home some time later, prompting a search. Newspaper reporting of the attack speculated that, once found, the murderer would be lynched.

Police received a report from a child on November 9 regarding a black man who they had seen in Limon the previous afternoon. The lack of an arrest to that point and the media's report of the purported suspect (as well as their insistence that the murder was committed by a black man) drew anger from the public. As a result, the police posted a $500 reward (equivalent to $19,000 in 2025) and questioned three black men but released all three due to their alibis.

The Porters were leaving Denver, Colorado, to return to Kansas on November 11 when they were first questioned by police, then arrested and jailed. More questioning followed the next day, after which the Lincoln County sheriff announced his belief that Preston Jr. alone was responsible, despite Preston's corroborated claims that he was approximately five miles outside of Limon roughly one hour after the murder. The police cited several allegedly bloodstained items as evidence: some clothes which had been mailed to Preston's mother, as well as burned clothing and a handkerchief which were found in a public area near the boxcar the Porters were living in. The latter items were never connected to Porter or the victim. During the same interview, the sheriff announced that Porter would be transported by train from Denver to Lincoln County. After four days of torture in a sweatbox, Porter gave a forced confession to the murder under threat of his father and brother being lynched. Following Porter's confession, the plan to transport him to Lincoln County was carried out, despite its danger to Porter; on November 13, the Henry County Democrat claimed that "it is certain that [Porter] will be lynched, probably be burned [sic], upon his arrival there".

A citizens' meeting held in Limon sometime before November 16 resolved that Porter should be lynched, but that he should be killed by hanging "with all the decorum of a legal execution", according to The Courier-Journal. The meeting further resolved that "no brutality will be tolerated". Additionally, a "vigilance committee" was formed in Limon on the night of November 15. The Courier-Journal speculated that, since Limon residents were aware of the sheriff's plan, they would plan to stop the train and abduct Porter; the same newspaper opined that "in this event, he will undoubtedly be lynched".

== Abduction and lynching ==
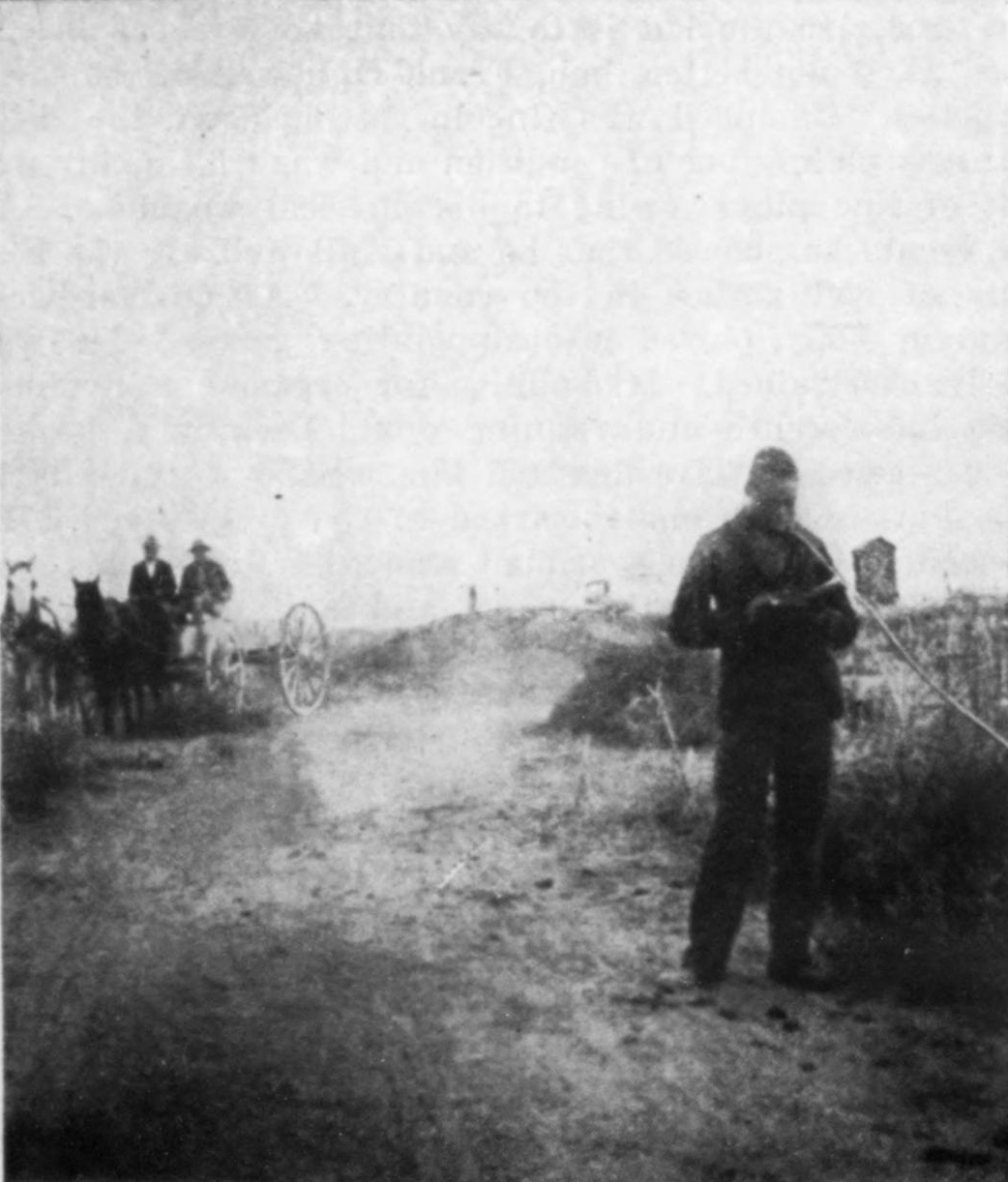
Porter reading his Bible while being led with a rope to the stake to be burned

Porter was escorted from the jail in Denver at noon on November 16 and taken to a Union Pacific Railroad station approximately 9 miles (14 km) away. The train carrying Porter left Denver at 1:10 p.m. and was stopped in Limon at 3:45 p.m. en route to its final destination, the county jail in Hugo, Colorado. During the journey, according to The San Francisco Call, Porter predicted that he would be captured in Limon and killed. When the train stopped, the sixteen-member vigilance committee boarded and abducted Porter against the sheriff's protests. As their original plan was to hang Porter, a noose was fit around his neck, though ultimately the decision regarding the method of death was left to Richard W. Frost, Louise's father, amidst protests that hanging would not be severe enough. After the men boarded, the train continued on for 3 miles (4.8 km) before stopping at Lake Station.

Porter was taken by the mob to the site of Louise's murder, where they began preparations. After the decision was made that Porter would be burned, the mob gathered and prepared wood for roughly an hour; during this time, Porter did not speak. He appeared "sullen" according to a reporter from The New York Times and was "trembling with fear" according to The Courier-Journal. He passed much of this time reading from the Gospel of Luke out of a Bible given to him by a jailer in Denver.

The execution was originally scheduled to begin at 5:30 p.m., though it was delayed by nearly an hour to allow for spectators to arrive from elsewhere in the county. Ultimately, the crowd of spectators numbered in excess of 300; The Courier-Journal claimed that roughly "700 people witnessed the execution".

Upon being directed, Porter approached the stake—the mob opted to use a steel rail—though he knelt to pray and was allowed adequate time to do so. He arose on his own, walked to the stake, and assumed a position with his back to it. Six men bound him to the rail with ropes and chains. Porter obliged some members of the crowd who requested souvenirs by handing out pages torn from his Bible. Kerosene was poured on the wood surrounding him, and Frost lit the fire at 6:23 p.m. Porter's pants were the first to catch fire. He remained silent until the fire had grown considerably closer to his face, and for much of the remaining time that he was conscious, he begged the crowd for mercy and repeatedly asked to be shot. He fell to the ground when the rope securing his hands burned; this concerned the crowd, but they were put at ease when Porter's feet remained fastened to the stake. Now, with only his feet burning, more wooden boards were laid atop his body and lit, quickly leading to a loss of consciousness. He was found to be dead by the crowd approximately twenty minutes after the fire was lit, placing his time of death around 6:43 p.m.

The mob's demeanor remained calm throughout the lynching; The New York Times reported that it was done "coolly and deliberately". The majority of the mob dispersed quickly after the fire went out, though several men stayed behind to stoke the fire until Porter's remains were nearly completely cremated.

== Aftermath ==
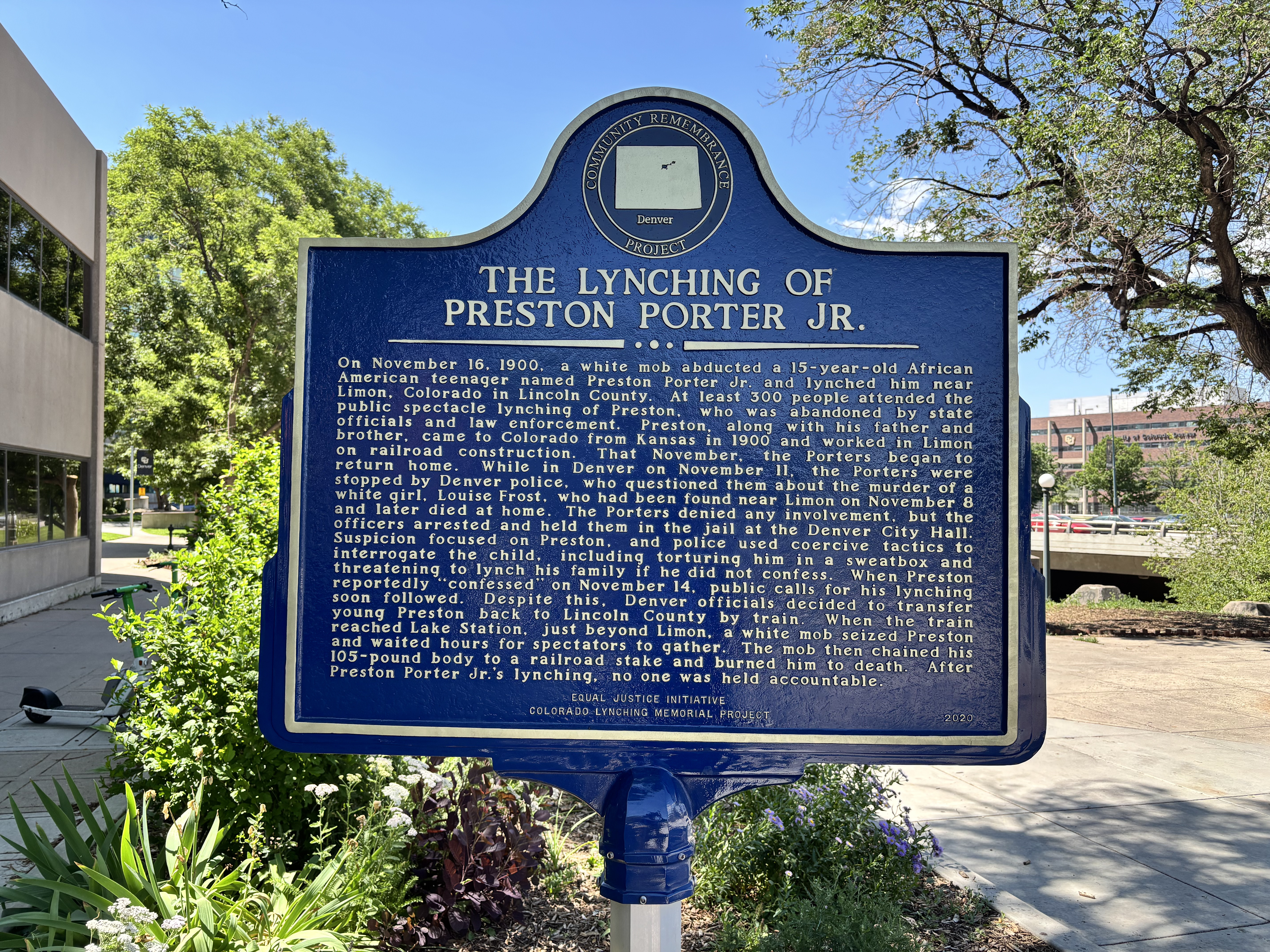
Historical marker in Denver, erected in October 2020

Initial reports indicated that there would be no inquest into Porter's death owing partly to the lack of any remains. However, human bone fragments, presumed to have been Porter's, were found at the lynching site roughly a week afterwards; they were collected by the coroner and an inquest was held which concluded that Porter's death came "at the hands of parties unknown". The district attorney opted against any criminal proceedings due to the overwhelming public approval of the lynching (though public opinion generally condemned the method used). Nobody was ever held accountable for the lynching despite the existence of photographs taken during the lynching which show faces of members of the mob. Porter's father and brother were released from custody on the morning after the attack.

When asked for comment following the lynching, Colorado governor Charles S. Thomas did not offer a statement. Earlier in the week, he had remarked that "hanging is too good for [Porter]" and that he supported the "spirit of the lynch law", further saying that "there is nothing [the Anglo-Saxon] will not do to avenge the loss of a woman's honor." The lynching re-ignited the debate surrounding capital punishment in Colorado. It had been abolished in 1897 but several lynchings that took place around the turn of the century led the Colorado General Assembly to reinstate it effective July 1, 1901.

The Colorado Lynching Memorial Project (CLMP) held a soil collection ceremony at the site of the lynching in 2018; the soil samples they collected were sent to the National Memorial for Peace and Justice (informally the "National Lynching Memorial") in Montgomery, Alabama. A historical marker was erected in downtown Denver (Note: The marker is located at 14th Street and Larimer Street (39°44′49″N 105°0′0.6″W), near the former site of the jail where the Porters were held following their arrest.) in October 2020, and a formal unveiling ceremony took place the following month. The CLMP also held a "remembrance and discussion" at a church in Denver in November 2022.

Lynching was made a federal hate crime in the United States by the Emmett Till Antilynching Act, which was passed by the 117th Congress and signed into law by President Joe Biden on March 29, 2022.
