= Franklin Savings Association =

American Savings and loan association

- Type: Subsidiary
- Industry: Savings and loan
- Founded: 1889; 137 years ago in Ottawa, Kansas as the Ottawa Mutual Loan and Savings Association
- Defunct: February 16, 1990; 36 years ago
- Fate: Liquidation
- Headquarters: Ottawa, Kansas, U.S.
- Key people: Ernest M. Fleischer

Franklin Savings Association was an Ottawa, Kansas-based American Savings and loan association that was one of the largest seizures of the savings and loan crisis. Subsequent litigation established that the institution had always been in full capital compliance, a fact to which the FDIC stipulated in 2011, after 21 years of legal challenges by Franklin's shareholders. Also, the FDIC refused to open its books to a bankruptcy judge and never demonstrated that the seizure resulted in a loss to the American taxpayers. It is widely believed that Franklin's assets, which had a book value of more than $380 million when seized, were ultimately sold by the government to private investors at a significant profit.

Franklin Savings was founded in 1889. In 1972, Ernest Fleischer, became its largest shareholder. In 1981, a new business plan was developed for the thrift with the help of economics professor Wayne Angell who would go on to become a Federal Reserve Board governor, and its assets grew from $200 million to $11 billion. The thrift bought a large amount of mortgage-backed securities and had dealings in financial futures and interest rate swaps as part of a sophisticated risk hedging program that would come to be regarded in following years as state of the art. Franklin pioneered the practice of putting its portfolio through stress tests long before the Dodd-Frank Wall Street Reform and Consumer Protection Act of 2010 would require such a practice of the nation's largest banks. They had various complex securities that included deep discounted securities, long call and put options and strips (both interest only and principal only) all of which were used for interest rate and prepayment risk hedging practices, not for speculation. They had also purchased junk bonds. The thrift had few traditional home mortgage loans on its books. The thrift's liabilities consisted primarily of Federal Home Loan Bank borrowings and repurchase agreements. In addition, over 70% of its deposits were obtained through brokers or telephone marketing programs, a method for raising deposits which U.S. District Judge Dale E. Saffels, a former Federal Home Loan Bank Board President, found at trial to be less expensive and more reliable than traditional deposits, despite Office of Thrift Supervision regulators' unsupported claims to the contrary. The thrift also bought the stock brokerage firms of L. F. Rothschild Holdings Inc., Stern Brothers & Company, and Underwood, Neuhaus & Company.

Franklin Savings was seized by the government in February 1990. At the time it had assets of $9.3 billion and deposits of $4.6 billion. Franklin filed a lawsuit disputing the seizure, and Judge Saffels in Topeka, Kansas ruled that the seizure was illegal. He found there was no basis in fact or law for the seizure, that it was arbitrary and capricious, and that, "there has been no allegation or even hint of illegal or unethical conduct by Franklin's management or directors. Essentially, this case boils down to a dispute over accounting practices." (Entire ruling attached.) Judge Saffels found that Franklin was in full capital compliance with a regulatory GAAP net worth of $388,519,213 and an economic value of no less than that.

However, the government appealed and the lower court's decision was reversed by the United States Court of Appeals for the Tenth Circuit. Limiting its scope of review to the record presented by the OTS to justify the seizure, the court concluded that: "A review of the administrative file clearly reveals a high-flying, debt-laden, troubled savings and loan. The record reveals the owners diverting millions of dollars into their pockets through large salaries, bonuses and dividends, notwithstanding the losses being incurred by the association. The record reveals a financial institution taking what the director deemed to be unacceptable risks with its depositors' monies. In fact, the record reveals a financial institution both unable and unwilling to comply with the director's requirements relating to safety and soundness concerns."

The court arrived at this conclusion after determining that a court's role under FIRREA is limited to determining whether the statutory grounds existed for a seizure. The 10th Circuit concluded that, under FIRREA, the statutory grounds exist if in the Director's "opinion" they exist. The court went on to apply a dictionary definition of opinion: "a belief held with confidence, not substantiated by direct proof or knowledge."

The appeal became settled precedent for the post-seizure scope of judicial review for federally insured banks and thrifts after the United States Supreme Court declined to review the case.

In addition to losing on appeal before the 10th Circuit, Franklin's shareholders were denied hearings as a matter of law for their claims to recover the value of their holdings on either Takings (Claims Court and Federal Circuit) or Tort (District and 10th Circuit), a fact which raises questions to this day about the lack of due process in Franklin's case. At one point, in an effort to put an end to the shareholders' legal challenges, the RTC/FDIC brought claims for over $200 million against FSA shareholders, directors and officers. But, following a jury trial, the government lost on all 19 separate claims that the Federal District Court Judge had not dismissed as a matter of law. The FDIC, from FSA assets, then paid the defendants $3.5 million to reimburse them for their counsel fees and expenses.

In 1993, Federal Bankruptcy Judge John Flannagan ruled (Finding of Fact Number 80 in the Bankruptcy Court's opinion in In re Franklin Savings Corp., 159 B.R. 9, 25 (Bankr.D.Kan. 1993): “As of January 1, 1990, FSA capital, according to generally accepted accounting principles, was $388,519,213.” He also noted: "FSC has urged the Court to accept the factual findings Judge Saffels made in Franklin Sav. v. Office of Thrift Supervision, 742 F.Supp. 1089 (D.Kan.1990), as legally binding factual findings in this case. This Court finds it unnecessary to address that request since it has made its own independent findings of fact based on the evidence presented on the record made here."

In 2004, Federal Bankruptcy Court Judge John Lungstrum, in his opinion granting summary judgment in favor of FSC on its objection to the OTS claim in FSC v. OTC, 303 B.R. 488 (D.Kan. 2004), concluded: “It is undisputed that a capital deficiency did not exist.”

Ultimately, in December 2011 bankruptcy court proceedings, the FDIC agreed that in seizing Franklin the OTS had taken over a solvent and fully capital compliant institution (Stipulation Dkt. #1628 filed 12/21/2011, ¶ 4, p. 2 [At the time of the appointment of the Conservator, FSA had a GAAP net worth of $388,519,213.]).
