= Charles J. Hughes Jr. =

American politician

Charles James Hughes Jr.
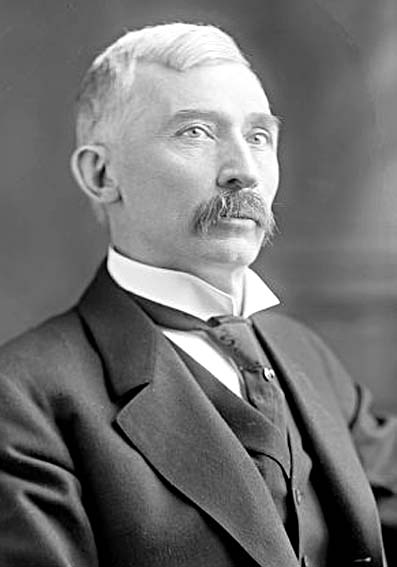

United States Senator from Colorado
- In office March 4, 1909 – January 11, 1911
- Preceded by: Henry M. Teller
- Succeeded by: Charles S. Thomas

Personal details
- Born: February 16, 1853 Kingston, Missouri, US
- Died: January 11, 1911 (aged 57) Denver, Colorado, US
- Party: Democratic

Charles James Hughes Jr. (February 16, 1853 – January 11, 1911) was a United States Senate from Colorado.

Born in Kingston, Missouri, Hughes attended the common schools and graduated from Richmond (Mo.) College in 1871. He then graduated from the law department of the University of Missouri in Columbia in 1873, was admitted to the bar in 1877, and commenced practice at Richmond, Missouri. He moved to Denver, Colorado in 1879.

Hughes was a presidential elector on the Democratic ticket in 1900. He was professor of mining law in the law school of the University of Denver and Harvard University. He was elected as a Democrat to the United States Senate and served from March 4, 1909, until his death in Denver on January 11, 1911. He was interred in Fairmount Cemetery, Denver.

== See also ==
- List of members of the United States Congress who died in office (1900–1949)

== Sources ==
- United States Congress. "Charles J. Hughes Jr. (id: H000919)". Biographical Directory of the United States Congress.
- U.S. Congress. Memorial Addresses. 61st Cong., 3rd sess. from 1910 to 1911. Washington, D.C.: Government Printing Office, 1911.

U.S. Senate
Preceded by Henry M. Teller	U.S. senator (Class 2) from Colorado; March 4, 1909 – January 11, 1911; Served alongside: Simon Guggenheim	Succeeded by Charles S. Thomas
