= Guggenheim Foundation =

Guggenheim Foundation or Guggenheim Fund may refer to:

- Daniel Guggenheim Fund for the Promotion of Aeronautics (1926–1930), which awarded grants to establish schools and research centers of aeronautics
- Daniel and Florence Guggenheim Foundation (1924–2011), which awarded grants in aviation and rocketry and, after 1972, in criminal justice
- Harry Frank Guggenheim Foundation, which supports scholarly research on violence
- John Simon Guggenheim Memorial Foundation, which awards Guggenheim Fellowships annually to scientists, scholars and artists
- Solomon R. Guggenheim Foundation, which funds the Guggenheim Museums, and funded Guggenheim International Awards from 1956 to 1964

== See also ==
- Guggenheim (disambiguation)
