= Heinrich Guggenheimer =

German-born American mathematician (1924–2021)

Heinrich Walter Guggenheimer (July 21, 1924 – March 4, 2021) was a German-born Swiss and American mathematician and educator, who has contributed to knowledge in differential geometry, topology, algebraic geometry, and convexity. He was Jewish and has also contributed volumes on Jewish sacred literature.

== Life and career ==
Heinrich Walter Guggenheimer was born on July 21, 1924, in Nuremberg, Germany. He is the son of Marguerite Bloch and the physicist Siegfried Guggenheim (physicist). He studied in Zürich, Switzerland at the Eidgenössische Technische Hochschule, receiving his diploma in 1947 and a D.Sc. in 1951. His dissertation was titled "On complex analytic manifolds with Kähler metric". It was published in Commentarii Mathematici Helvetici (in German).

Guggenheimer began his teaching career at the Hebrew University as a lecturer, 1954–56. He was a professor at the Bar Ilan University, 1956–59. In 1959, he immigrated to the United States, becoming a naturalized citizen in 1965. Washington State University was his first American post, where he was an associate professor. After one year he moved to University of Minnesota where he was raised to a full professor in 1962. While in Minnesota, he wrote Differential Geometry (1963), a textbook treating "classical problems with modern methods". According to Robert Hermann in 1979, "Among today's treatises, the best one from the point of view of the Erlangen Program is Differential Geometry by H. Guggenheimer, Dover Publications, 1977."

In 1967 Guggenheimer published Plane Geometry and its Groups (Holden Day), and moved to New York City to teach at Polytechnic University, now called New York University Tandon School of Engineering. In 1977, he published Applicable Geometry: Global and Local Convexity.

Until 1995 Guggenheimer produced a steady stream of papers in mathematical journals. As a supervisor of graduate study in Minnesota and New York, he had six students proceed to Ph.D.s with theses supervised by him, two in Minnesota and four in New York. See the link to the Mathematics Genealogy Project below.

Guggenheimer has also contributed to literature on Judaism. In 1966, he wrote "Logical problems in Jewish tradition". The next year he contributed "Magic and Dialectic" to Diogenes where he examines the supposition that "knowledge of the right name gives power over the bearer of that name". In 1995 Guggenheimer presented The Scholar's Haggadah, which makes a bilingual comparison of variances in the traditions of Passover observance, including Ashkenazic, Sephardic, and Oriental sources. One of its most significant contributions to Haggadah scholarship was the identification of references to the Haggadah's text in verses from the Septuagint, the third century B.C.E. Greek translation of the Pentateuch. His study of the Jerusalem Talmud provided text and commentary.

He died in March 2021 at the age of 96.

== Family ==
On June 6, 1947, Guggenheimer married Eva Auguste Horowitz. Together with his wife they wrote Jewish Family Names and their Origins: an Etymological Dictionary (1992). They have two sons, Michael, a professor of Arabic, and Tobias, an architect, and two daughters Dr. Esther Furman, a biochemist, and Hanna Y. Guggenheimer, an artist.
