= Simon Guggenheim =

American businessman and politician (1867–1941)

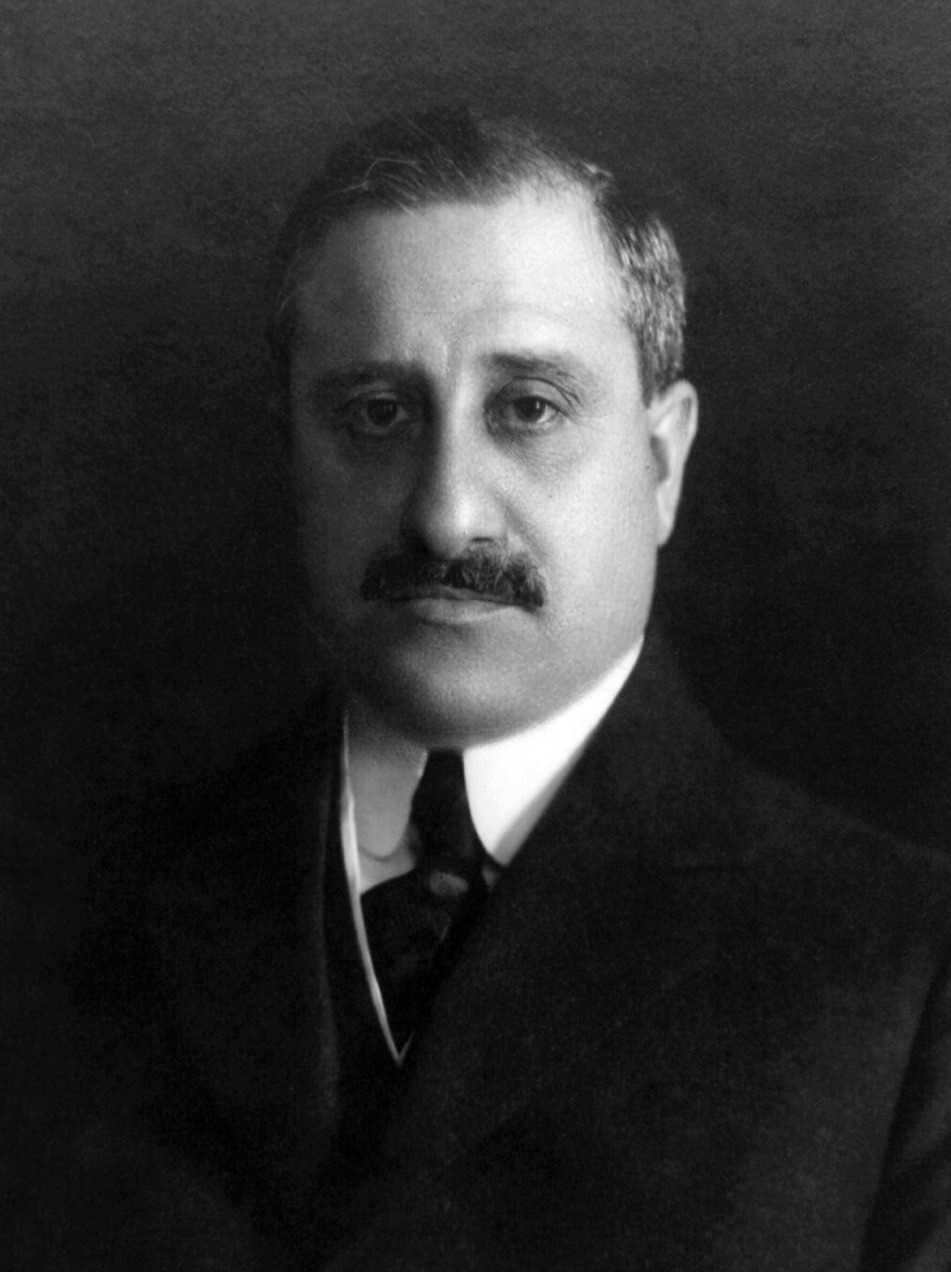
- Guggenheim in June 1916

United States Senator from Colorado
- In office March 4, 1907 – March 3, 1913
- Preceded by: Thomas M. Patterson
- Succeeded by: John F. Shafroth

Personal details
- Born: December 30, 1867 Philadelphia, Pennsylvania, U.S.
- Died: November 2, 1941 (aged 73) New York City, U.S.
- Party: Republican
- Spouse: Olga Hirsch
- Parent: Meyer Guggenheim (father)
- Relatives: Guggenheim family
- Education: Peirce College

John Simon Guggenheim (December 30, 1867 – November 2, 1941) was an American businessman, politician and philanthropist.

== Early life and education ==
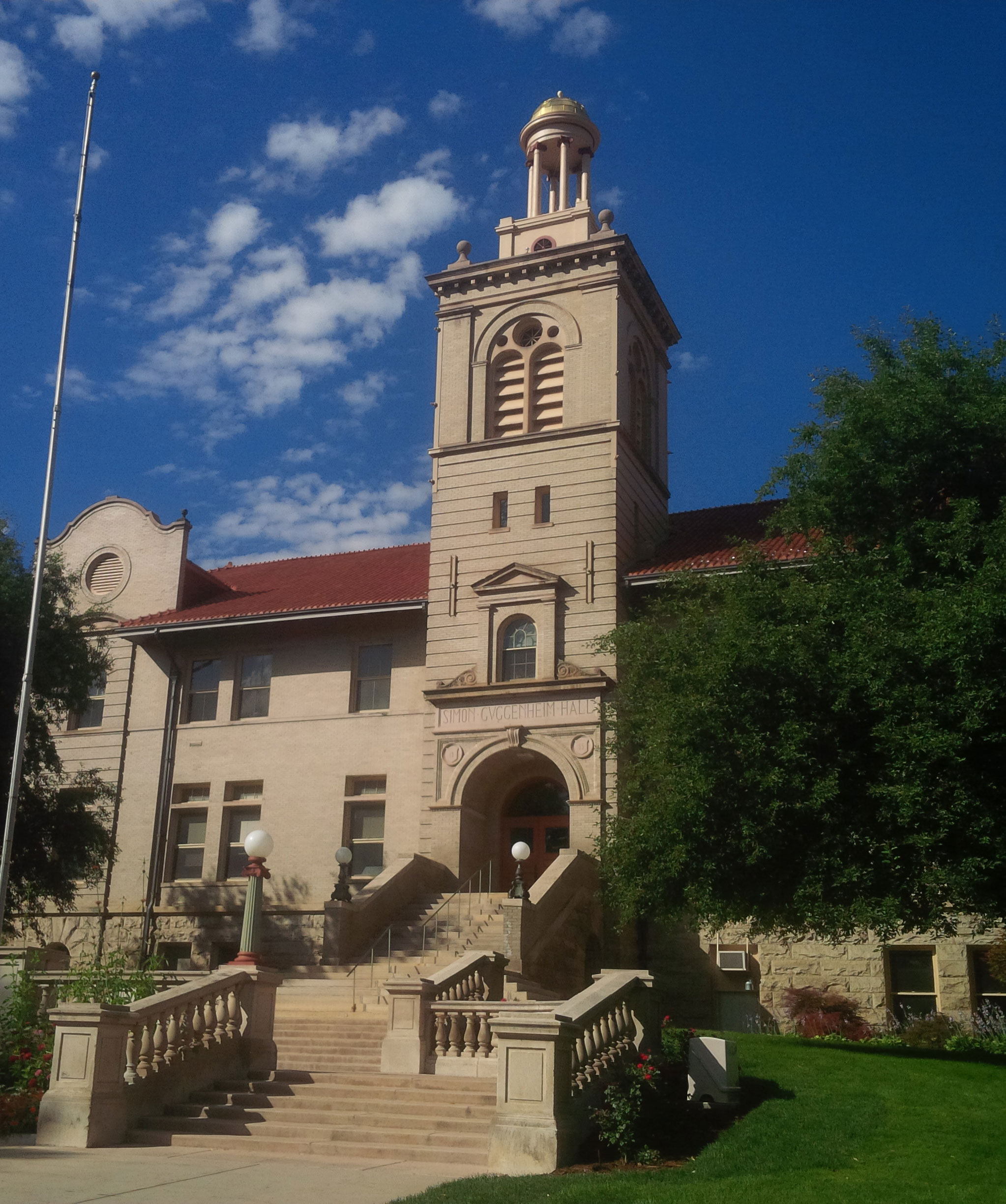
Simon Guggenheim Hall at the Colorado School of Mines in Golden, Colorado

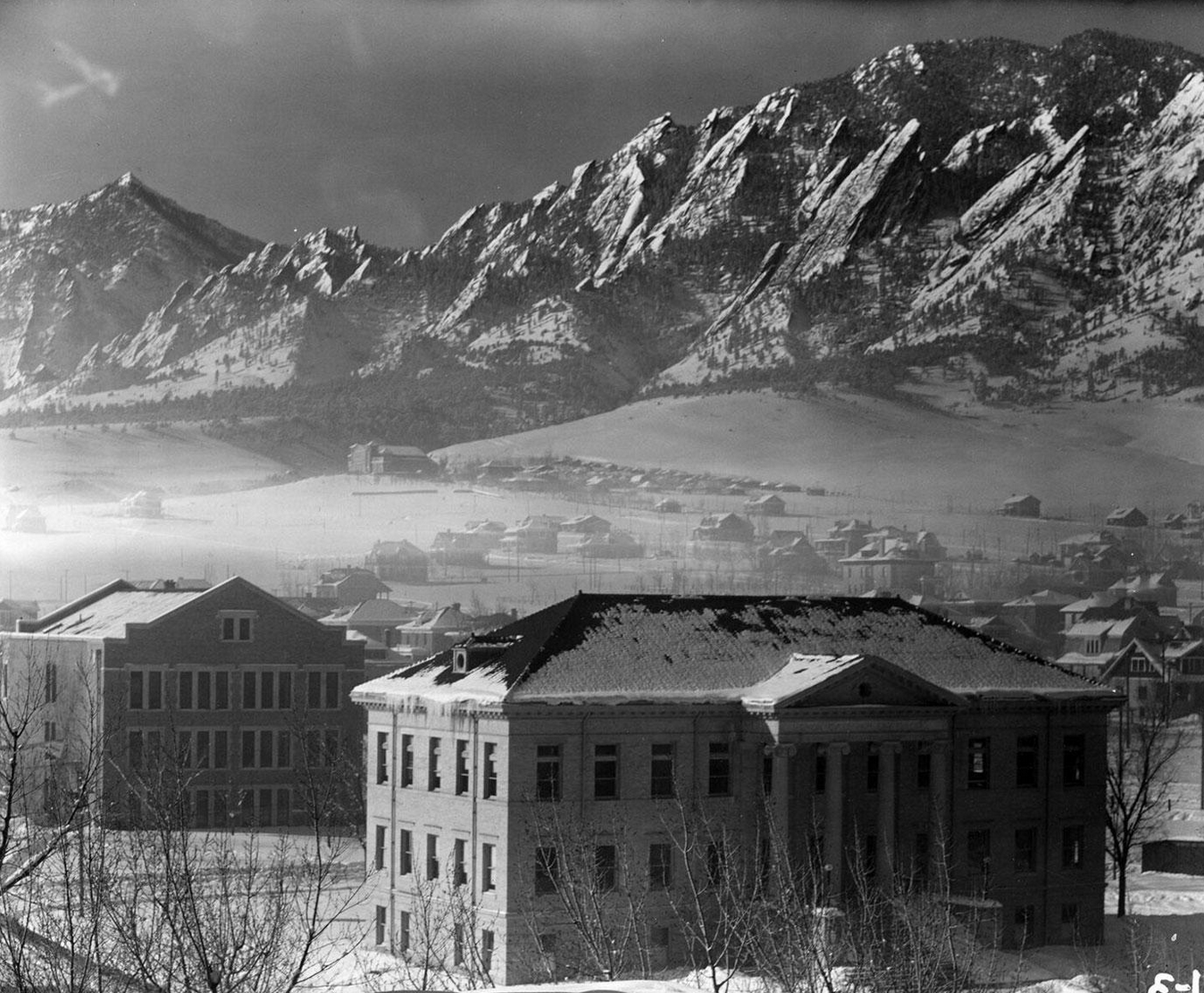
Guggenheim Hall at the University of Colorado Boulder in 1911

Guggenheim was born in Philadelphia of Jewish descent on December 30, 1867, the son of Meyer Guggenheim and Barbara Guggenheim, and was the younger brother of Daniel Guggenheim and Solomon R. Guggenheim. He attended Central High School and the Peirce School of Business Administration, both in Philadelphia.

== Career ==
After graduating from Peirce School of Business Administration, Guggenheim relocated to Pueblo, Colorado, where he worked as the chief ore buyer at M. Guggenheim's Sons, his father's mining and smelting company.

In 1898, he was the Republican candidate for Governor of Colorado, but withdrew after riots broke out at the state convention in Colorado Springs, during which one man was killed and several injured. He was a presidential elector in 1904.

=== U.S. Senate ===
In 1907, Simon Guggenheim was elected as a Republican to the United States Senate, representing Colorado from 1907 to 1913. During his term in the Senate, he chaired the Committee to Establish a University of the United States, and the Committee on the Philippines.

While he was in Congress, one of Guggenheim's older brothers, Benjamin Guggenheim, died in the RMS Titanic catastrophe.

=== Business ===
After his U.S. Senate term expired, he and his wife Olga returned to New York City. Guggenheim joined the board of American Smelting and Refining Company, and was later appointed chairman of the board. From 1919 to 1941, he was the company's president.

== Personal life ==
After moving to Denver in 1892, Guggenheim married Olga Hirsch on November 24, 1898, at the Waldorf Astoria New York in Manhattan. To celebrate their marriage, the Guggenheims provided a Thanksgiving dinner to 5,000 poor Manhattan children.

Their first child, John Simon Guggenheim, was born in 1905. To commemorate the event, Simon Guggenheim made an $80,000 donation (equivalent to $2,900,000 in 2025) to the Colorado School of Mines to build a namesake building, Simon Guggenheim Hall. At the time, it was the largest private grant ever made to a state institution.

In 1907, Olga gave birth to their second son, George Denver Guggenheim. In 1909, Simon donated a law school building at the University of Colorado.

In 1922, Guggenheim's son John died of mastoiditis just before leaving for college. In 1925, in his memory, Guggenheim and his wife established the John Simon Guggenheim Memorial Foundation.

In 1939, the Guggenheims' second son, George, committed suicide in a Manhattan hotel at the age of 32.

== Death ==
On November 2, 1941, Guggenheim died in New York City, at age 73. He is interred in the Woodlawn Cemetery in The Bronx.

== See also ==
- Guggenheim family
- Meyer Guggenheim
- John Simon Guggenheim Memorial Foundation
- List of Jewish members of the United States Congress

U.S. Senate
Preceded by Thomas M. Patterson	U.S. senator (Class 2) from Colorado; 1907–1913; Served alongside: Henry M. Teller, Charles J. Hughes, Jr., Charles S. Thomas	Succeeded by John F. Shafroth
