= Tobias Guggenheimer =

American architect

Tobias Guggenheimer (born January 30, 1953) is a Swiss-American architect, educator and author.

== Early life and education ==
Tobias Guggenheimer, AIA, NCARB, was born in Basel, Switzerland. Raised in Switzerland, Israel and the United States, he earned a bachelor's degree in English literature at Binghamton University and a professional master's degree in architecture at the University of Colorado Denver. His father, Dr. Heinrich Guggenheimer (died 2021) was a mathematician with a doctorate from the ETH Zurich. His mother, Dr. Eva A. Guggenheimer, (née Horowicz) (died 2016) earned a diploma from the Algemeine Gewerbeschule of Basel and a Ph.D. in philology from the University of Minnesota.

== Professional career ==
Guggenheimer is principal of Tobias Guggenheimer Architect, PC., established in New York in 1991. He also founded Globareach Design Inc., a Philippine Corporation, in 2007. He conducted his internships at Haines Lundberg Whaeler in New York City and at Peter Gisolfi Associates of Hastings-on-Hudson, New York. From his offices in Evergreen & Boulder, Colorado (1980–87), Dobbs Ferry, New York (1991–2010), Makati, Philippines (2010–2020), Ordot, Guam (2021–present) and Bainbridge Island, Washington (2021–present) he designed over 45 residential projects in the Village of Tuxedo Park, New York plus new homes, renovations and restorations for properties located in Evergreen, Colorado; Irvington, New York; Chappaqua, New York; Ardsley-on-Hudson, New York; Hastings-on-Hudson, New York; Larchmont, New York; Manhattan, New York; The Bronx, New York; West Hampton, New York; Seattle, Washington; Lummi Reservation, Washington; Kirkland, Washington; Arlington, Washington; Spearfish, South Dakota; Mandaluyong, Philippines; Alabang, Philippines and Yigo, Guam. For his renovation/restoration of Imlagh, originally the home of Pierre Lorillard, founder of Tuxedo Park, he curated and sourced a collection of art and antiques on the ground in India, Sri Lanka, Bhutan, Nepal, China, Thailand, Vietnam and the Philippines for the current owners, Steve Hellman and Dr. Kathy Hsu.

Guggenheimer restored Frank Lloyd Wright's Edward Serlin House in the Frank Lloyd Wright designed village of Usonia, in Pleasantville, New York, to its current configuration. He also provided technical consultancy for Frank Lloyd Wright's Reisley Residence, also in Usonia.

For Asian Development Bank he designed country headquarters in Kolonia, Micronesia and Majuro, Marshall Islands. For Peninsula Hotels he designed a flagship restaurant, an executive lounge and a presidential suite. He also designed a variety of restaurants, multi-family buildings, shops, garden structures and other architectural typologies. For Full-Stack Modular of Brooklyn, NY, he investigated parametric, modular solutions for private residences, mid-rise apartment buildings and a nursing home. Under the guidelines of the New York City Metropolitan Transportation Authority he designed a lightweight, prefabricated shop, 'The Honest Boy', over the Houston Street subway stop in Manhattan. With Jack Adams Design he conceptualized a diver's resort on the Egyptian Red Sea coast. Other projects include schematic design of the Pacific War Museum in Tamuning, Guam. His first furniture collection was constructed by Mehitabel Furniture Company of Cebu, Philippines.^{.} His second furniture collection was constructed by Rey Soliven in Pampanga, Philippines. Pro-bono projects include an award-winning concept for bamboo-based, low-cost housing in rural, tropical regions, a pocket park, a mangrove habitat center and a community music school. Images of his architecture and interior design work are collected at www.guggenheimerarchitect.com.

== Academic career ==
Guggenheimer taught architectural design, theory and technology courses at Pratt Institute (1987 - 1999) where he was Administrator for Special Programs at the School of Architecture. He was chair of the interior design program at the Marymount College Campus of Fordham University (1999-2003), teaching design, practice and preservation. Subsequently he was professor of interior design at Parsons School of Design (2003 - 2007) where he also served in the administration of the interior design department. Guggenheimer taught hospitality design at Enderun Colleges (2010 - 2012) and was dean and Vice President for Academics at SoFA Design Institute in Makati, Philippines (2013-2020). At SoFA he also taught advanced seminars on design process as applied to a broad variety of disciplines and led design enrichment tours to New York, Bangkok, Florence and Cebu.

For Goethe Institut, the German government's cultural organization, Guggenheimer conceived and conducted several design competitions, including 'Shelter for Displaced Humanity', 'The City of the Future', and 'Architecture for Reconciliation'. For Pratt Institute's Puck Galleries he curated the grant supported exhibitions, 'The Independent Work of Frank Lloyd Wright's Apprentices' and 'Architectural Competitions in America'. Guggenheimer curated the exhibition "Digital Artisans" for the Design Center of the Philippines.

Guggenheimer lectured at the National Building Museum, Washington, DC; Midland Center for the Arts, Midland, Michigan; Taliesin, Spring Green, Wisconsin; Cooper Hewitt Museum School, New York, New York; Pittsburgh AIA Chapter/Carnegie Mellon University conference on Frank Lloyd Wright. International Design Conference, Taipei, Taiwan; University of San Carlos, Cebu, Philippines; Holy Angel University, Angeles City, Philippines; Anthology Architecture Festival, Manila, Philippines; AEDES Metropolitan Lab, Berlin, Germany; British Council's 'Making Futures' Symposium in Cebu, Philippines.

== Publications ==
Guggenheimer wrote the book, A Taliesin Legacy: The Architecture of Frank Lloyd Wright's Apprentices, published by Van Nostrand Reinhold (now John Wiley and Sons). In addition to showcasing the work of Wright's apprentices, the book considers the efficacy of Wright's 'learning by doing' approach to design education.

"This beautifully illustrated and colorful book focuses on the work of the designers and architects who apprenticed with Frank Lloyd Wright at the Taliesin Fellowship in Scottsdale, Arizona from 1937-1950s".

Guggenheimer was a contributing editor to Journal of the Taliesin Fellows, wrote the column, "First Principles" for Bluprint Magazine from 2015 to 2019, and contributed a chapter to Muhon: Traces of an Adolescent City, a catalog accompanying the Philippines pavilion of the Venice Biennale.

== Personal ==
Guggenheimer is married to Yasmin Guggenheimer (née De Ocampo). He was previously married to Lisa Ann Guggenheimer (née Shapiro). He has four daughters: Anna Bella, Leanora Margaret, Maya Olivia & Zoe Isabella. His brother, S. Michael, is a translator and professor of Arabic. His sister Dr. Esther H. Guggenheimer-Furman, is a translator and author. His sister Hannah Y. is an artist.
