= William Guggenheim =

American businessman and philanthropist (1868–1941)

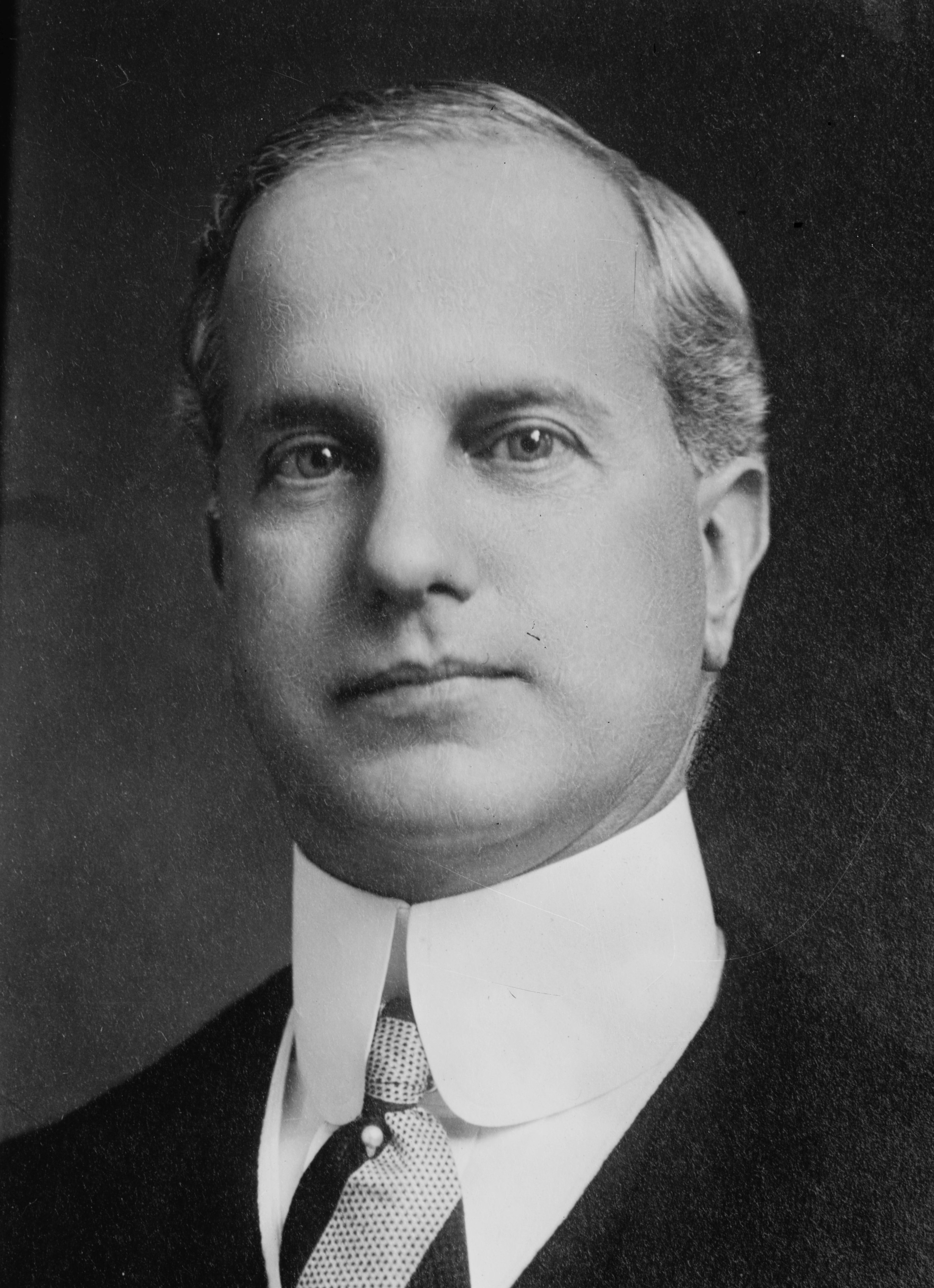
- Born: November 6, 1868; Philadelphia, Pennsylvania, U.S.
- Died: June 27, 1941 (aged 72); Manhattan, New York, U.S.
- Spouses: Grace Brown (m. 1900; div. 1901); Aimee Steinberger (m. 1904; died 1941)
- Children: 1
- Parent: Meyer Guggenheim
- Relatives: See Guggenheim family

William Guggenheim (November 6, 1868 – June 27, 1941) was an American businessman and philanthropist. He was the youngest son of Meyer Guggenheim, the patriarch of the Guggenheim family.

Guggenheim became a member of the American Philosophical Society in 1930.

== Education and career ==
After attending Philadelphia public schools, Guggenheim matriculated in 1885 at the University of Pennsylvania (Penn), where he graduated in 1889 with a B.S. in chemistry and metallurgy. He had a successful career in mining and smelting ventures until his early retirement in 1901. Until the end of his life he was an extremely active Penn alumnus and held various leadership position in the Penn Club of New York. He gave many talks at University of Pennsylvania gatherings. As a Republican and anti-Communist, he self-published several pamphlets on his philosophy and politics.

== Personal life ==
William married Grace Brown on November 3, 1900, in Philadelphia, Pennsylvania. The couple received fierce backlash from William's brother Daniel who disapproved of the match because Grace was a gentile and divorcée. In 1901 Grace filed for divorce in Chicago, Illinois, and was awarded $150,000 in alimony. William married a second time to Aimee Lillian Steinberger (1875–1957) on October 16, 1904. Their only son, William Guggenheim Jr., was born on July 25, 1907. Grace Brown later claimed in 1913 that her marriage to William hadn't been annulled in 1901, due to the fact neither she nor William were Illinois residents at the time of their divorce. If Brown's claims were valid, this would make William a bigamist and render his son illegitimate. The case was later dismissed since Brown had claimed she was an Illinois resident during the divorce.

== Later years ==
After years of marital strain, William separated from Aimee. William died on June 27, 1941, in Manhattan, New York, and was interred at Salem Fields Cemetery in the Guggenheim family plot. He left his entire estate to four former showgirls.

== Guggenheim Honor Cup ==
On February 6, 1911, William Guggenheim donated the Guggenheim Honor Cup to the Penn Club of New York. The cup, made of silver with a simple design, was to be engraved each year with the name of a Penn alumnus who had honored the University of Pennsylvania by achieving notable success. Each such honoree was celebrated at the club's annual dinner in New York City. The original cup was engraved with names until 1955. The 1919 engraving jointly honored Penn alumni who had served in WW I. From 1956 to 1959 the Guggenheim Honor Cup was replaced by the Benjamin Franklin Honor Cup.
