= Meyer Guggenheim =

Patriarch of the Guggenheim family (1828–1905)

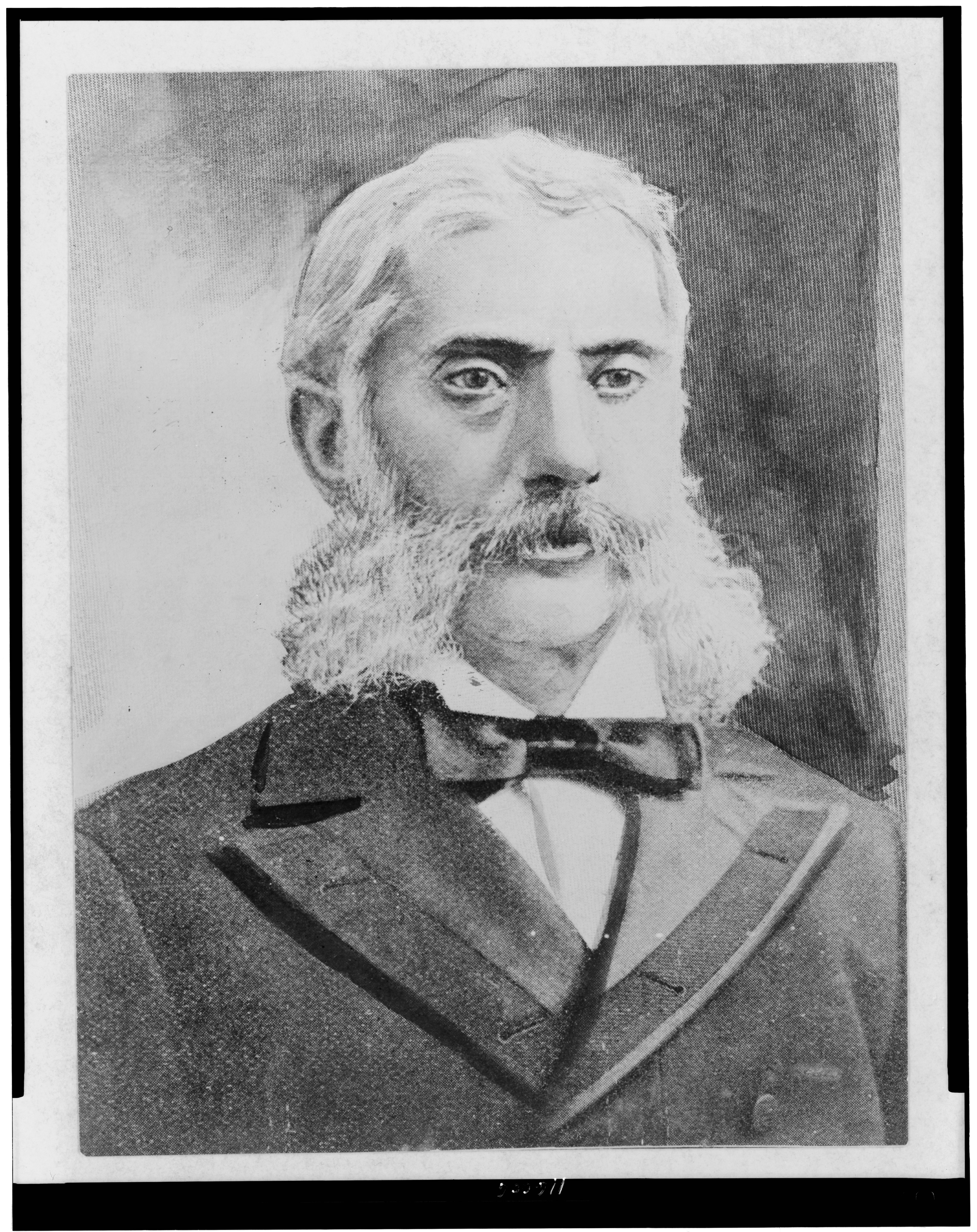
- Born: February 1, 1828; Lengnau, Aargau, Switzerland
- Died: March 15, 1905 (aged 77); Palm Beach, Florida, U.S.
- Occupation: Businessman
- Spouse: Barbara Weil (m. 1852; died 1900)
- Children: 10, including: Daniel Guggenheim; Solomon R. Guggenheim; Simon Guggenheim; Benjamin Guggenheim; William Guggenheim
- Family: Guggenheim family

Meyer Guggenheim (/ˈɡʊɡənhaɪm/ GOOG-in-hime; German: [ˈmaɪər ˈɡʊɡn̩haɪm]; February 1, 1828 – March 15, 1905) was the patriarch of what became known as the Guggenheim family in the United States, which became one of the world's wealthiest families during the 19th century, and remained so during the 20th.

== Early life ==
Guggenheim was born in Lengnau, Aargau, Switzerland, on February 1, 1828. He was the son of Simon Meyer Guggenheim and Schafeli (née Levinger) Guggenheim and was of Ashkenazi Jewish ancestry. He had five siblings. Guggenheim's family fell into poverty when his father had to give up his job to care for Guggenheim's sick mother. His mother eventually died when Meyer was 6 years old. As a child, Meyer sold articles door-to-door after school to support his family. His father hoped to remarry with Rachel Weil, a widow. However, due to his father's poverty, restrictions in Switzerland stopped them from getting married. This forced the family to emigrate to the United States, where no such restrictions on marriage applied.

== Career ==
After emigrating from Switzerland in 1847 to the United States, he launched a new life in the importing business. He ultimately made his fortune (one of the largest of the 19th century) through business ventures in mining and smelting, mostly in the United States.

After investing in silver mines in the Leadville mining district of Colorado, he expanded into ore smelting in Colorado. He built a number of smelters across the United States and in northern Mexico. As his several sons grew up, they assumed leading roles in the family mining and smelting business.

== Family ==
Guggenheim met Barbara Weil (1834–1900), his stepsister, and married her four years later around 1852. Together, they were the parents of ten surviving children:

Five of their seven sons were active in the family businesses.

- Isaac Guggenheim (1854–1922), who married Carrie Sonneborn in 1876.
- Daniel Guggenheim (1856–1930), head of the family after his father's death, who was the most active of his sons in developing and acquiring worldwide mining interests.
- Maurice Guggenheim (1858–1939), originally in the lace and embroidery import business; by 1881, he was a financier involved in mining and smelting.
- Solomon Robert Guggenheim (1861–1949), a supporter of modern art through his foundation and donations to the Museum of Modern Art.
- Jeanette Guggenheim (1863–1889), married Albert Gerstle and died in childbirth.
- Benjamin Guggenheim (1865–1912), who died in the Titanic disaster. He married Florette Seligman.
- John Simon Guggenheim (1867–1941), a one-term senator from Colorado.
- William Guggenheim (1868–1941)
- Rose Guggenheim (1871–1945), married three times: first to Albert Loeb (head of the New York Stock Exchange), then to Samuel M. Goldsmith in 1908, and last to Charles E. Quicke.
- Cora Gwendalyn Guggenheim (1873–1956) married Louis Frank Rothschild, founder of L.F. Rothschild.

After his wife's death in 1900, Guggenheim and his sons provided $200,000 to Mount Sinai Hospital for the construction of a hospital in her honor. Guggenheim died on March 15, 1905, in Palm Beach, Florida. He was interred at the Salem Fields Cemetery in Brooklyn, New York.

=== Descendants ===
Through his son Benjamin, Guggenheim was a grandfather of art collector and socialite Peggy Guggenheim.
