= L.F. Rothschild =

Merchant and investment banking firm

- Type: Defunct, acquired
- Traded as: NYSE: R
- Industry: Financial services
- Founded: 1899
- Founder: Louis F. Rothschild (1869–1957)
- Defunct: 1988
- Fate: Acquired in 1988 following bankruptcy by Franklin Savings Association
- Headquarters: New York City
- Products: Investment banking, brokerage

L.F. Rothschild (later known as L.F. Rothschild, Unterberg, Towbin) was a merchant and investment banking firm based in the United States and founded in 1899. The firm collapsed following the 1987 stock market crash. It was not related to the Rothschild family despite being in the finance industry.

== History ==
L.F. Rothschild & Co. was founded in 1899 by Louis F. Rothschild (1869–1957), who was not related to the Rothschild family. Together with partner Leonard Hockstader, Rothschild took up the offices and business of Albert Loeb & Co. at 32 Broadway in New York City, New York. The firm's primary business was sales and trading of fixed income securities. The firm also had an arbitrage group as well as retail brokerage and wealth management operations.

Following its merger with C.E. Unterberg, Towbin in 1977, the firm was known as L.F. Rothschild, Unterberg, Towbin and was led primarily by Thomas I. Unterberg and A. Robert Towbin. As of March 26, 1977, it moved to 55 Water Street, leasing the 45th and 46th floors. The firm was known for its merchant banking investments, particularly in high-technology companies. In the early 1980s, the firm emerged as the leading underwriter of initial public offerings, surpassing the elite investment banks (at the time, including Lehman Brothers, Goldman Sachs, and Morgan Stanley). Among the companies they took public were Intel, Cray Research, and biotechnology company Cetus Corporation.

In 1986, just ten years after merging with L.F. Rothschild, Towbin and Unterberg left the firm to join Shearson Lehman. The split was attributed to their opposition to plans to expand the firm's bond sales and trading operations. However, in the negotiations with outside firms related to that expansion and capital infusion, at least one particularly attractive offer required that Unterberg and Towbin step down from management positions or leave the firm. Hard feelings between senior management that resulted by considering that offer were believed to be the causal factor behind their departure by most insiders. Ultimately, the firm's stock trading exposure during the stock market crash in 1987 led directly to its demise.

Unterberg left Lehman four years later, in 1990, to form Unterberg Harris.

The firm suffered heavy losses in the 1987 stock market crash and was acquired by Kansas-based Franklin Savings Association in February 1988. However, even with new capital, the firm's holding company, L. F. Rothschild Holdings Inc. filed for Chapter 11 bankruptcy protection in July 1989. By the end of 1989, the firm had gone from a peak of 2,200 employees to 45.

== Notable people ==
Notable people associated with L.F. Rothschild include:

- Thomas H. Lee, the private equity investor who founded Thomas H. Lee Partners in 1974
- John M. Angelo and Michael L. Gordon, who left the firm in 1988 to found Angelo, Gordon & Company.
- Daniel Scotto, former Director of Research, joined the firm in 1982, later President and CIO of Whitehall Financial Advisors LLC.
- Jordan Belfort, founder of stock brokerage Stratton Oakmont, and subject of the 2013 film The Wolf of Wall Street, convicted of securities fraud, among other felonies.
- Jean Shafiroff, philanthropist and socialite
- Alan B. Slifka, investor, philanthropist, co-founder of the Abraham Fund, and founding chairman of the Big Apple Circus
