= Rowland Suddaby =

British artist and illustrator

Rowland Suddaby (1912–1972) was a British artist and illustrator.

Rowland Suddaby was born in Kimberworth, Yorkshire in 1912. Suddaby won a scholarship to Sheffield College of Art and studied there from 1926.

Suddaby moved to London in 1931. He exhibited in shows at London's Wertheim Gallery, and The Redfern Gallery from 1936, and later at Austin Desmond.

At the start of World War II, he moved to near Sudbury, Suffolk, with his wife Elizabeth and daughter Joanna. He was the curator of Gainsborough's House in Sudbury from 1968 to 1972.

Suddaby's work is held in the collections of 18 UK galleries, including the V&A, and the Government Art Collection has 24 of his works.
