= Guggenheim family =

American business family

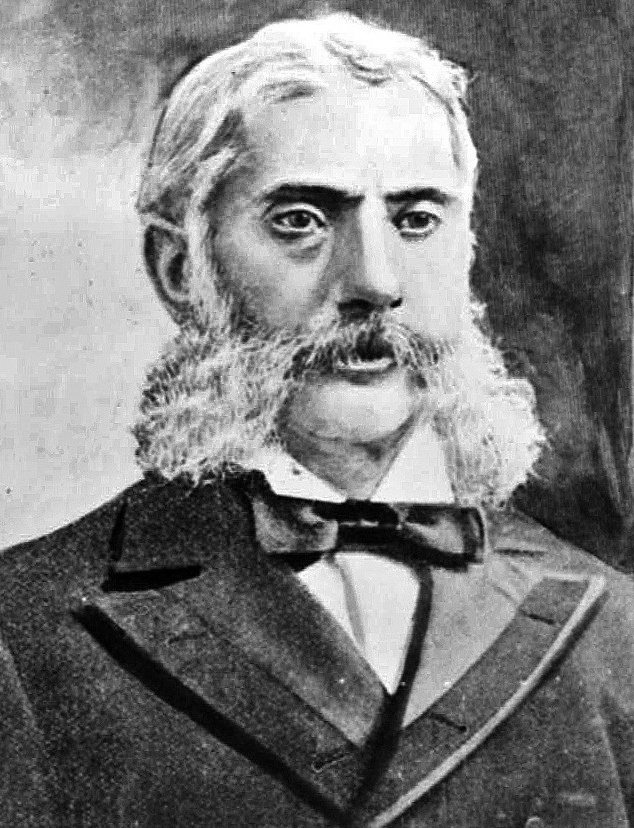
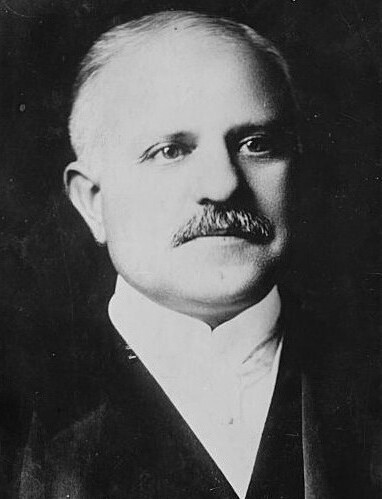
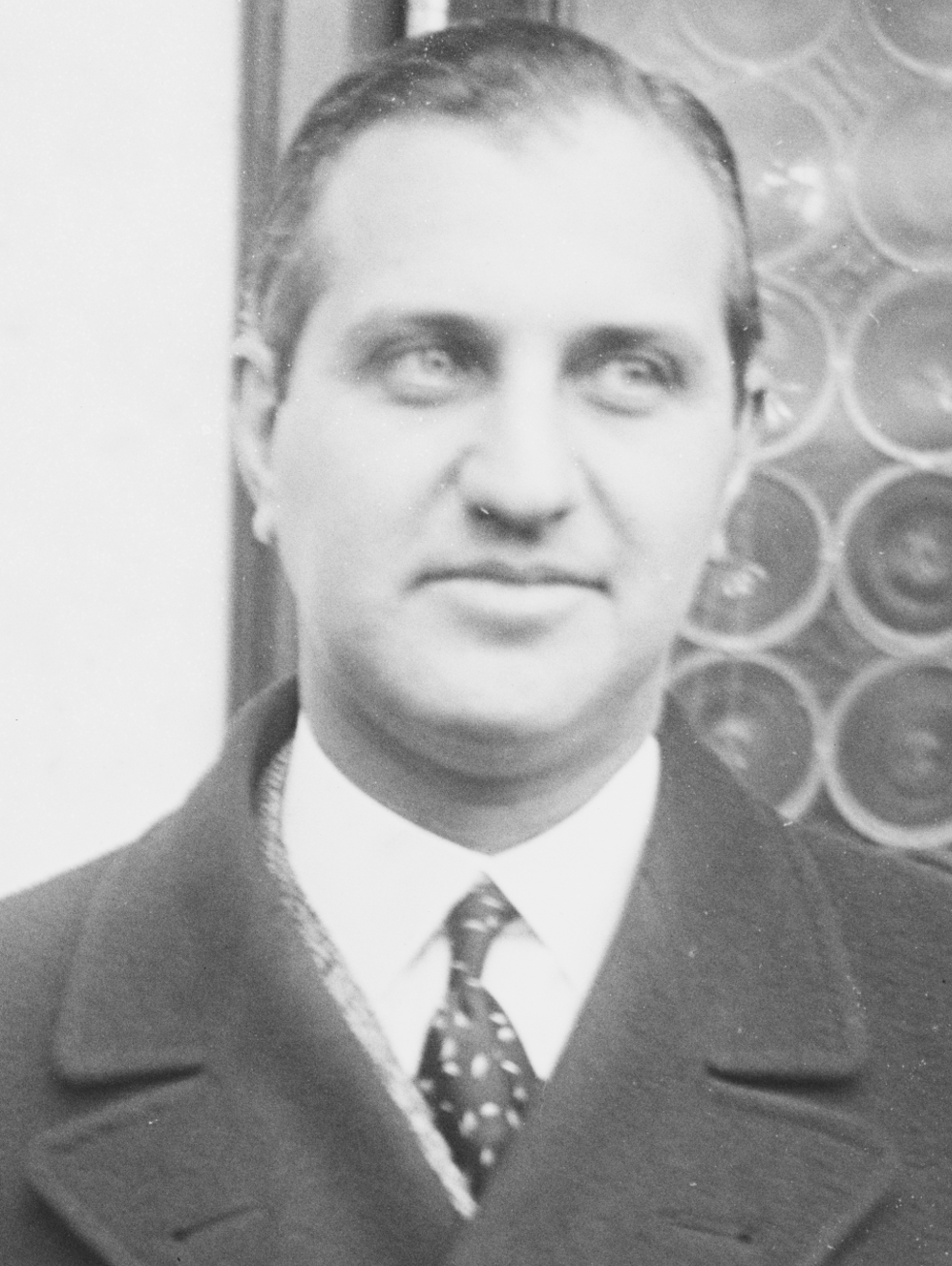
- Meyer Guggenheim Daniel Guggenheim Harry F. Guggenheim
- Current region: New York City
- Origin: Lengnau, Switzerland
- Founded: c.1800s
- Founder: Simon Meyer Guggenheim
- Connected families: Loeb family Morton family Straus family
- Estates: Falaise (Sands Point, New York); Murry Guggenheim House (West Long Branch, New Jersey)

The Guggenheim family (/ˈɡʊɡənhaɪm/ GUUG-ən-hyme) is an American family of Swiss origin known for making their fortune in the mining industry, in the early 20th century, especially in the United States and South America. After World War I, many family members withdrew from the businesses and became involved in philanthropy, especially in the arts, aviation, medicine, and culture.

== History ==
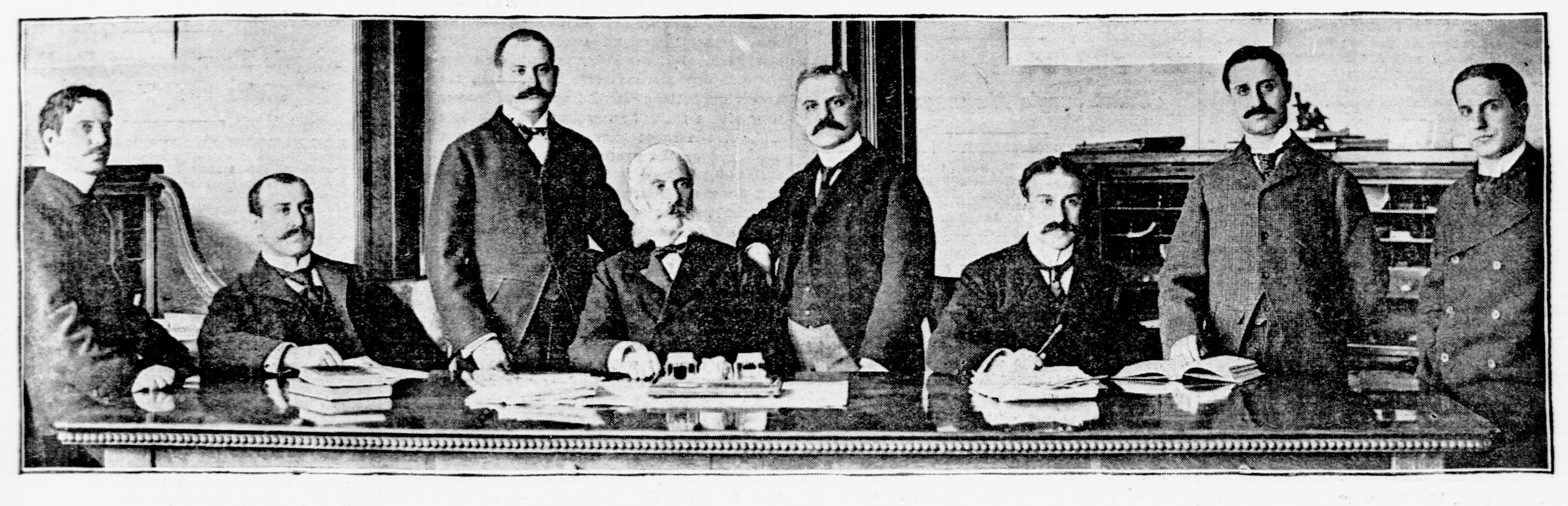
Meyer Guggenheim and his seven sons. Meyer is in the center of the group. From left to right, are: Benjamin, Murry, Isaac, Daniel, Solomon, Simon and William

Meyer Guggenheim, of Ashkenazi Jewish ancestry from the Swiss town of Lengnau, arrived in the United States in 1847. His surname derived from the name of the Alsatian village of Gougenheim. He married Barbara Meyer, whom he met in the United States. Over the next few decades, their 11 children and their descendants became known for global successes in mining and smelting businesses, under the name Guggenheim Exploration, including the American Smelting and Refining Company. In 1882, with seven of his sons already involved in the family businesses, Meyer organized M. Guggenheim's Sons, which was later reorganized as Guggenheim Brothers. In the early 20th century, the family amassed one of the largest fortunes in the world.

Following World War I, the Guggenheim family sold its global mining interests and later purchased nitrate mines in Chile. Subsequently, the family largely withdrew from direct involvement in running businesses. Family members became known for their philanthropy in diverse areas such as modern art, aviation, and medicine. They donated funds to develop Guggenheim Museums, the Guggenheim Aeronautical Laboratory, and the Guggenheim Pavilion at Mount Sinai Medical Center in Manhattan, designed by I. M. Pei.

== Current interests ==
Peter Lawson-Johnston, a British Guggenheim descendant, founded Guggenheim Partners which today (2025) manages over $345 billion in assets. Another family vehicle, Guggenheim Investment Advisors, oversees about $50 billion in assets.

== Family tree ==
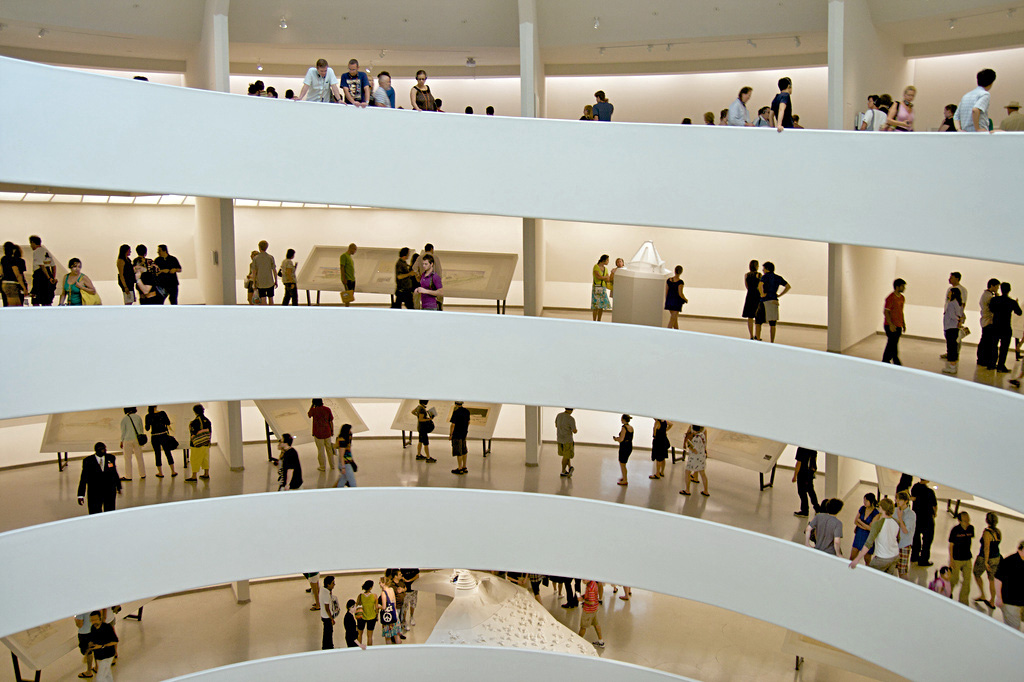
Solomon R. Guggenheim Museum, 5th Avenue, Manhattan

Meyer Guggenheim (1828–1905) married Barbara Meyer, of German Jewish descent, in 1852. They met in the United States. They had 11 children together, including eight sons, five of whom were active in the family businesses: Isaac, Daniel, Maurice ("Murry"), Solomon Robert, and (John) Simon Guggenheim. Sons Benjamin, Robert, and William pursued other careers. The daughters were Jeanette, Rose, and Cora. Meyer's 11 children, their spouses, and notable descendants are shown below:

- Meyer Guggenheim (1828–1905), m. Barbara Meyer (1834–1900) (m. 1852 – her death)
  - Isaac Guggenheim (1854–1922), m. Carrie Sonneborn (1859–1933) (m. 1876 – his death)
    - Beulah V. Guggenheim (1877–1960), m. William I. Spiegelberg
    - Edyth B. Guggenheim (1880–1960), m. Louis M. Josephthal, future admiral and founder of Josephthal & Co.
      - Audrey Josephthal (1903–2003) m. Cornelius Ruxton Love Jr. (died 1971)
        - Iris Love (1933–2020)
    - Helene Guggenheim (1886–1962)
      - m. Edmund L. Haas (m. 1905; div.)
      - m. Corlette Glorney
      - m. Lord Melvill Ward
  - Daniel Guggenheim (1856–1930), became head of the family after his father's death; m. Florence Shloss (1863–1944) (m. 1884 – his death)
    - Meyer Robert Guggenheim (1885–1959)
    - Harry Frank Guggenheim (1890–1971)
      - Diane Guggenheim (1924–1991)
    - Gladys Eleanor Guggenheim (1895–1980), m. Roger Williams Straus (1891–1957) (m. 1914 – his death)
      - Roger Williams Straus Jr. (1917–2004), a founder and chairman of Farrar, Straus and Giroux, publishers
        - Roger Williams Straus III (born 1943)
          - Tamara Straus (born 1969)
            - Isaac Straus Haymaker (born 2008)
  - Maurice "Murry" Guggenheim (1858–1939), m. Leonie Bernheim (1865–1959) (m. 1887 – his death)
    - Edmond A. Guggenheim (1888–1972), m. Marion Price (1888–1992)
    - Lucille Guggenheim (1894–1972), m. Frederic Adam Gimbel (1891–1996), div.
  - Solomon R. Guggenheim (1861–1949), founded the Solomon R. Guggenheim Museum and Foundation; m. Irene M. Rothschild (1868–1954), daughter of Victor Henry Rothschild (m. 1895 – his death)
    - Eleanor Mary Guggenheim (1896–1992), m. Arthur Stuart, 7th Earl Castle Stewart (1889–1961) (m. 1920 – his death)
      - David Stuart, Viscount Stuart (1921–1942)
      - Robert Stuart, Viscount Stuart (1923–1944)
      - Arthur Stuart, 8th Earl Castle Stewart (1928–2023)
        - Andrew Stewart, 9th Earl Castle Stewart (born 1953)
      - The Honorable Simon Stuart (1930–2002)
    - Gertrude R. Guggenheim (1898–1966)
    - Barbara Josephine Guggenheim (1904–1985), married John Lawson-Johnston of the family producing Bovril
      - Peter Lawson-Johnston, President Guggenheim Museum, founder Guggenheim Partners
  - Jeanette Guggenheim (1863–1889), m. Albert M. Gerstle (1860–1896)
    - Nettie Gerstle (1889–?)
  - Benjamin Guggenheim (1865–1912), died in the Titanic disaster; m. Florette Seligman (1870–1937) (m. 1895 – his death)
    - Benita Rosalind Guggenheim (1896–1927), m. Nathaniel Josef Johnson (1894-1990) (m. 1921 - her death)
      - Catherine Jean Smith (nee' Johnson) (1922-2018), m. Daniel Ray Hudson (1921-2005) (m. 1945 - his death)
      - Vincent James Johnson (1925-2012), m. Judith Vivian Higgins (b. 1932) (m. 1955 - his death)
    - Marguerite "Peggy" Guggenheim (1898–1979), founded the Peggy Guggenheim Collection in Venice
      - m. Laurence Vail (div. 1928)
        - Michael Cedric Sindbad Vail (1923–1986), m. Margaret Angela Vail (m. 1957 – his death)
          - Karole Vail (1959–)
        - Pegeen Vail Guggenheim (1925–1967)
          - m. Jean Hélion (1904–1987) (m. 1946; div. 1956)
            - Fabrice Hélion
            - Nicolas Hélion
            - Davide Hélion
          - m. Ralph Rumney (1934–2002) (m. 1958 – her death)
            - Sandro Rumney (born 1958)
      - m. Max Ernst (1891–1976) (m. 1941; div. 1946)
    - (Barbara) Hazel King-Farlow Guggenheim (1903–1995),
      - m. Sigmund Marshall Kempner (m. 1921; div. 1922)
      - m. Milton S. Waldman (m. 1923; div. 1930)
        - Terrence Waldman (1924–1928)
        - Benjamin Waldman (1927–1928)
        - Terrence (four-and-a-half years old) and Benjamin (14 months) both fell to their deaths from the roof of the Surrey, a 16-story apartment hotel at 20 East 76th Street, New York, on October 19, 1928.
      - m. Denys King-Farlow (Hugh St. Denys Nettleton King-Farlow) (m. 1930; div.)
        - John King-Farlow (1932–2002)
        - Barbara Benita King-Farlow (1934–?)
          - Ghislaine Agostini
          - Amelia Kaye
          - Adam Jacobs
      - m. Charles Everett McKinley Jr. (d. 1942) (m. ? – his death)
      - m. Archibald Butt Jr. (div.)
      - m. Larry Leonard (div.)
  - Robert Guggenheim (1867–1876)
  - (John) Simon Guggenheim (1867–1941), elected as a U.S. Senator from Colorado; m. Olga Hirsch (1877–1970) (m. 1898 – his death)
    - John Simon Guggenheim (1905–1922)
    - George Denver Guggenheim (1907–1939)
  - William Guggenheim (1868–1941)
    - m. Grace Brown Herbert (m. 1900; div. 1901)
    - m. Aimee Lillian Steinberger (1877–1957) (m. 1904 – his death)
      - William Guggenheim Jr. (1907–1947), m. Elizabeth Newell (1913–2004) (m. 1937–his death) [she later m. William J. Broadhurst]
        - William Guggenheim III (1939–2023)
          - m. Grace Embury (1940– ) (div.)
            - Maire Embury Guggenheim (born 1962)
            - Jaenet Newell Guggenheim (1963–2011)
          - m. Judith Arnold (1943– ) (div.)
            - William Douglas Guggenheim (born 1970)
              - m. Traci Lee Aikey (born 1978)
                - Lilian Grace Guggenheim (born 2009)
                - Katherine Joy Guggenheim (born 2010)
                - Emily Faith Guggenheim (born 2013)
            - Jonathan Paul Guggenheim (born 1978)
              - Zoya Odette Guggenheim (born 2017)
          - m. Stephanie Maddox (born 1951) (div.)
  - Rose Guggenheim (1871–1945), m. Albert Loeb, the nephew of Solomon Loeb
    - Harold A. Loeb (1891–1974)
    - Edwin M. Loeb (1894–1966)
    - Willard E. Loeb (1896–1958)
  - Cora Guggenheim (1873–1956), m. Louis F. Rothschild (1869–1957), founder of L. F. Rothschild
    - Louis F. Rothschild Jr. (1900–1902)
    - Muriel Barbara Rothschild (1903–1999), m. William Donald Scott
    - Gwendolyn Fay Rothschild (1906–1983)

== Businesses ==
The following is a list of businesses in which the Guggenheim family have held a controlling or otherwise significant interest.

- ASARCO
- Anglo-Lautaro Nitrate Corporation
- Braden Copper Company
- Cain Hoy Stable
- Chile Exploration Company
- Farrar, Straus and Giroux
- Gourmet
- Guggenheim Partners
- Kennecott Copper
- Nevada Northern Railway
- Newsday
- Tradition Records
- Yukon Gold Company
