= Benjamin Guggenheim =

American businessman and Titanic passenger (1865–1912)

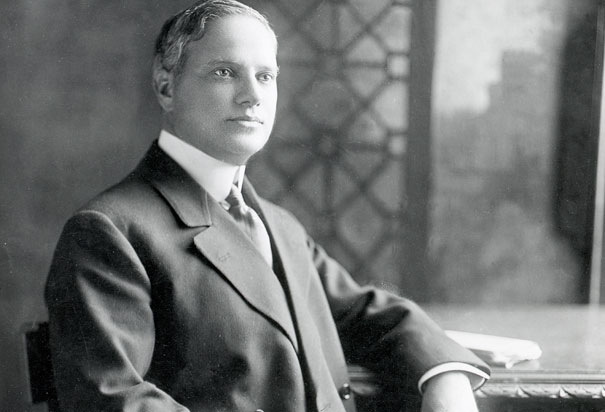
- Born: October 26, 1865; Philadelphia, Pennsylvania, U.S.
- Died: April 15, 1912 (aged 46); North Atlantic Ocean
- Cause of death: Sinking of the Titanic
- Education: Columbia College; Peirce School of Business
- Occupation: Businessman
- Spouse: Florette Seligman (m. 1894)
- Children: 3, including Peggy and Hazel
- Parent: Meyer Guggenheim

Benjamin Guggenheim (October 26, 1865 – April 15, 1912) was an American businessman who was a member of the Guggenheim family. He was among the most prominent American passengers aboard the British ocean liner RMS Titanic and perished along with 1,495 others when the ship sank on her maiden voyage.

== Early life and education ==
Benjamin Guggenheim was born October 26, 1865, in Philadelphia, Pennsylvania, the fifth of seven sons, to Meyer Guggenheim, a businessman who later became a mining magnate, and Barbara "Babette" Guggenheim (née Meyer; 1834–1900), both originally from Lengnau, Aargau, Switzerland, having emigrated to Philadelphia in 1847.

He was of Swiss Jewish descent with his ancestry deeply rooted in the villages of Lengnau and Endingen, Aargau. His paternal grandfather, Simon Meyer Guggenheim (1792–1869), a tailor by trade, wanted to marry for a second time, which was not permitted by Swiss authorities as they ruled the family being too poor. That was the ultimate reason for emigration.

Benjamin was the first member of his family to enter an institute of higher learning-he entered Columbia College in 1882, matriculating with the class of 1887. However, he found most of his courses boring and dropped out after his second year. He also attended the Peirce School of Business (now Peirce College), then one of the most prominent business schools in the country.

== Personal life ==
In 1894, Guggenheim married Florette Seligman (1870–1937), daughter of James Seligman, a senior partner in the firm J. & W. Seligman & Co., and Rosa Seligman (née Content). Her family originated in Baiersdorf, Germany. Together, they had three daughters:

- Benita Rosalind Guggenheim (1896–1927)
- Marguerite "Peggy" Guggenheim (1898–1979)
- Barbara Hazel Guggenheim (1903–1995).

Guggenheim inherited a great deal of money from his mother. Due to business concerns, he grew distant from his wife and was frequently away from their New York City home. He maintained an apartment in Paris, France.

== Titanic ==
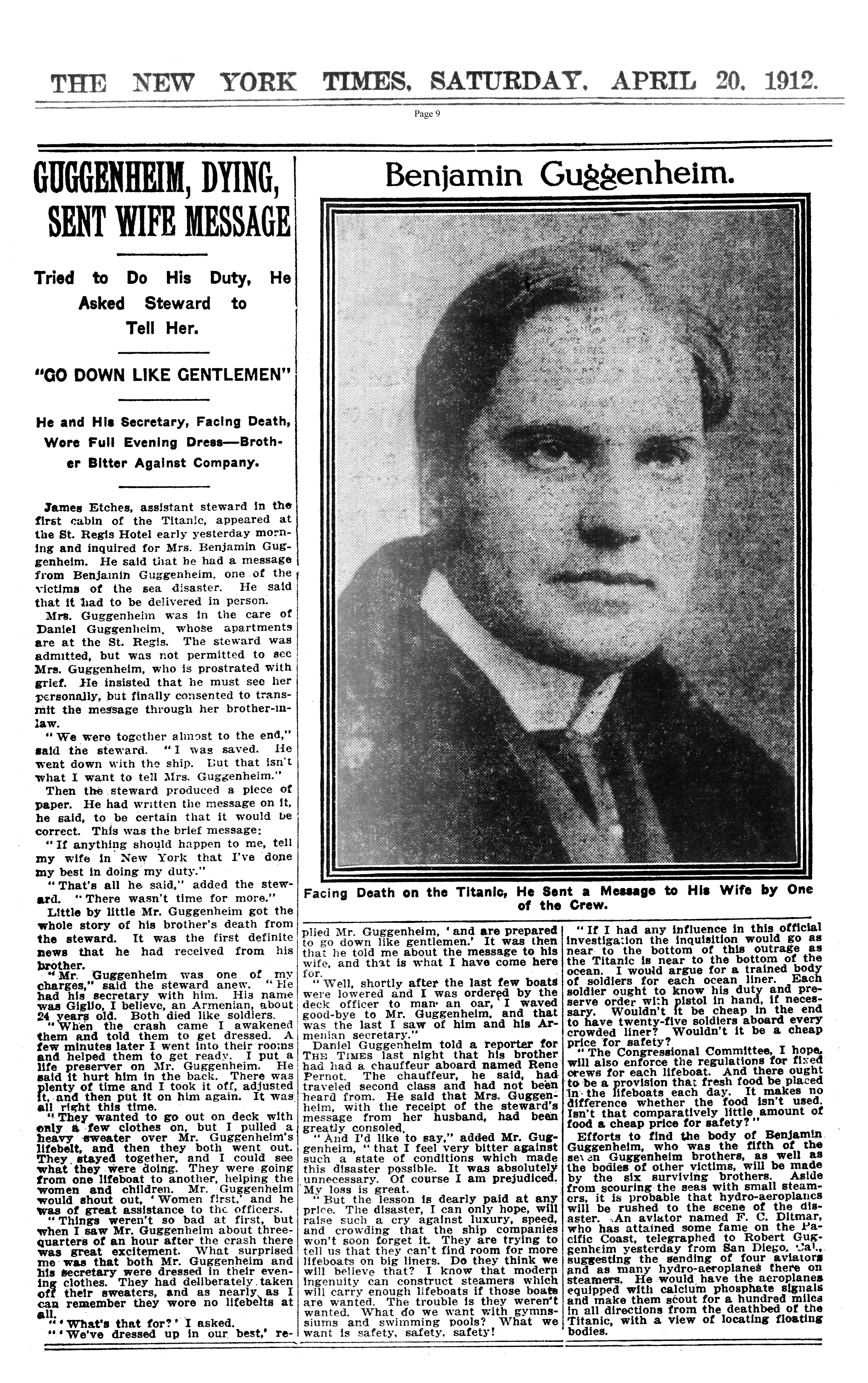
This article in The New York Times relates a description from an assistant steward of Guggenheim's last hours, including helping other passengers to board lifeboats, donning formal wear instead of a life preserver, and saying that he and his secretary were "prepared to go down like gentlemen".

Guggenheim boarded the RMS Titanic and was accompanied by his mistress, a French singer named Léontine Aubart (1887–1964); his secretary, Victor Giglio (1888–1912); his chauffeur, René Pernot (1872–1912); and Madame Aubart's maid, Emma Sägesser (1887–1964). His ticket was number 17593 and cost £79 4s (other sources give the price as £56 18s 7d). He and Giglio occupied stateroom cabin B84 while Aubart and Sägesser occupied cabin B35. Pernot occupied an unknown cabin in second class.

Guggenheim and Giglio slept through the Titanic's collision with the iceberg only to be awakened just after midnight ship's time by Aubart and Sägesser, who had felt the collision. Sägesser later quoted Giglio as saying, "Never mind, icebergs! What is an iceberg?" Bedroom steward Henry Etches stopped by Guggenheim's stateroom, B-84 and awoke Guggenheim and Giglio, telling them to get dressed. During the evacuation, Steward Etches returned to Guggenheim's stateroom; Guggenheim answered the door on the first knock, leading Etches to conclude that the magnate had only just retired and undressed for bed. Etches entered the room, pulled their three lifebelts out, and placed one on Guggenheim. "This will hurt", Guggenheim complained. Etches helped to pull heavy sweaters over them both. Giglio and Guggenheim stayed together as they left the cabin and went out on deck. Etches saw them on their way. Etches later testified that Guggenheim and his valet went from lifeboat to lifeboat ensuring the women and children were safely aboard and that the two were of great assistance to the officers.

Guggenheim ultimately realised that the situation was much more serious than he had inferred. Titanic survivor Rose Amelie Icard wrote in a letter, "The millionaire Benjamin Guggenheim after having helped the rescue of women and children, got dressed and put a rose at his buttonhole, to die." Sometime after arriving on deck, Etches saw Guggenheim and Giglio; they were dressed in their evening clothes and had taken off their sweaters and lifebelts. Guggenheim explained, "We've dressed up in our best and are prepared to go down like gentlemen." Etches, who survived the sinking, recorded Guggenheim's message to give to his wife: "If anything should happen to me, tell my wife in New York that I've done my best in doing my duty." Etches next watched Guggenheim and Giglio pass from Boats Nos. 7 and 5, "helping the women and children". Guggenheim shouted repeatedly, "Women first" and the two men were of "great assistance" to the officers. Another steward reportedly said Guggenheim sent another message to his wife, asking to tell her "that I played the game straight to the end and that no woman was left on board this ship because Ben Guggenheim was a coward. Tell her that my last thoughts will be of her and our girls". The steward said Guggenheim "lit a cigar and sauntered up to the boat deck to help load the lifeboats." As Aubart and Sägesser reluctantly entered Lifeboat No. 9, Guggenheim reportedly was on the deck nearby and spoke in German, "We will soon see each other again! It's just a repair. Tomorrow the Titanic will go on again." Etches reported that "shortly after the last few boats were lowered and I was ordered by the deck officer to man an oar, I waved good-bye to Mr. Guggenheim, and that was the last I saw of him and [Giglio]." Guggenheim and Giglio, as well as Guggenheim's chauffeur Pernot, died in the sinking. Their bodies were never recovered.

== Legacy ==
Guggenheim's family, including his brother Robert, had been hoping for news of their loved one, whom the press had reported was among the missing prior to the arrival of RMS Carpathia in New York (which had picked up over 700 survivors from the disaster). The news Guggenheim had died was confirmed by a wireless dispatch sent from the ship and received on April 18, 1912. After relating how Guggenheim was one of his charges during the voyage, Etches told them about Guggenheim's actions and the final favour asked of him. Etches, producing the note and handing it to the widow, reported: "That's all he said, there wasn't time for more." The family were very grateful for the news and visit.

=== Portrayals ===
On screen, Guggenheim has been portrayed by:

- Camillo Guercio (1953) (Titanic)
- Victor Thorley (1956) (Kraft Television Theatre; A Night to Remember)
- Harold Goldblatt (1958) (A Night to Remember) (British film)
- John Moffatt (1979) (S.O.S. Titanic; TV Movie)
- Joseph Kolinski (1997) (Titanic; Broadway Musical)
- Michael Ensign (1997) (Titanic)
- David Eisner (2012) (Titanic; TV series/3 episodes)
- Dirk Strachan-Thornton (2026) (Titanic, The Musical)

== Sources ==
- Fitch, Tad; Layton, J. Kent; Wormstedt, Bill (2012). On A Sea of Glass: The Life & Loss of the R.M.S. Titanic. Amberley Books. ISBN 978-1848689275.

== External links and references ==
- Encyclopedia Titanica Biography of Benjamin Guggenheim
- Benjamin Guggenheim on Titanic-Titanic.com
- Encyclopedia Titanica Biography of Emma Sägesser
- Titanic: Triumph and Tragedy, by John P. Eaton and Charles A. Haas, W.W. Newton & Company, 2nd edition 1995 ISBN 0-393-03697-9
- A Night to Remember, by Walter Lord, ed. Nathaniel Hilbreck, Owl Books, rep. 2004, ISBN 0-8050-7764-2
