= Earl Castle Stewart =

Title in the peerage of Ireland

Earldom of Castle Stewart
- Arms: Quarterly: 1st, Or a Lion rampant Gules, armed and langued Azure, within a Double-Tressure flory counter-flory Gules (Scotland); 2nd, Or, a Fess chequy Azure and Argent, in chief a Label of three-points Gules (Stuart); 3rd, Argent, a Saltire between four Roses Gules, barbed and seeded proper (Lennox); 4th, Or, a Lion rampant Gules (Macduff); the whole within a Bordure compony Argent and Azure. Crest: A Unicorn’s Head Argent, armed and maned Or. Supporters: On either side a Wyvern tail nowed Or, armed proper and langued Gules.
- Creation date: 29 December 1800
- Created by: George III
- Peerage: Peerage of Ireland
- First holder: Andrew Stuart, 1st Viscount Castle Stewart
- Present holder: Andrew Richard Charles Stuart, 9th Earl Castle Stewart
- Heir presumptive: Thomas Stuart
- Subsidiary titles: Viscount Castle Stewart; Baron Castle Stuart; Baronet ‘of Castle Stewart’
- Status: Extant
- Seats: Stuart Hall, near Stewartstown
- Motto: FORWARD

Earl Castle Stewart, in the County Tyrone, is a title in the Peerage of Ireland. It was created in 1800 for Andrew Thomas Stewart, 9th Baron Castle Stuart. The current holder is Andrew Richard Charles Stuart, 9th Earl Castle Stewart.

== History ==
The Earls Castle Stewart claim to be the head representatives in the pure male line of the Scottish Royal House of Stuart. They are directly descended from Sir Walter Stewart (died 1425), Keeper of Dumbarton Castle, younger son of Murdoch Stewart, 2nd Duke of Albany, son of Robert Stewart, 1st Duke of Albany, younger son of King Robert II of Scotland. One of Sir Walter's sons, Andrew Stuart, was created Lord Avandale (or Avondale) in 1459 and became Lord Chancellor of Scotland from 1460 to 1482. Another son, Walter Stewart, became feudal Baron of Morphie and was legitimised in 1479. His grandson Andrew Stewart was created Lord Avondale circa 1499, a revival of the title which had become extinct on his great-uncle's death in 1488. Andrew, Lord Avondale, was one of the many Scottish peers who were killed at the Battle of Flodden in 1513.

The eldest son of Lord Avondale (killed 1513), Andrew Stewart, 2nd Lord Avondale, exchanged the Lordship of Avondale with Sir James Hamilton for that of Ochiltree (see the Lord Ochiltree for further history of this title) by an Act of Parliament in 1542, becoming Lord Stuart of Ochiltree. He was succeeded by his son, Andrew Stewart, 2nd Lord Ochiltree. In turn, his son, Andrew Stuart (also spelled as Andrew Stewart), succeeded him as 3rd Lord Ochiltree and became First Gentleman of the Bedchamber to King James VI. To raise money, in 1615 he resigned the feudal barony of Ochiltree and the peerage to his first cousin, Sir James Stuart, the son of James Stewart, Earl of Arran, younger son of the second Lord Ochiltree.

In compensation for the loss of this title, in 1619 the King created the previous 3rd Lord Ochiltree the Baron Castle Stuart in the Peerage of Ireland. In 1611, he had settled in Ulster where he was granted 3,000 acres (12 km^{2}) of land in County Tyrone. He was succeeded by his son, the second Baron, Andrew Stewart (1590–1639), who one year before the death of his father had in 1628 been created a Baronet in the Baronetage of Nova Scotia. The second Baron made his home at Roughan Castle and was the founder of nearby Stewartstown, County Tyrone. His eldest son, Sir Andrew Stewart 2nd Bt., became the third Baron and Governor of Fort Falkland in County Offaly fighting as a Royalist in the Civil War. He was the father of one daughter, Mary, his sole heiress. She married Henry Howard, 5th Earl of Suffolk, and the majority of the Stewart estates in Ireland were swallowed up by him. The title Baron Castle Stuart passed briefly to Sir Andrew's brother, Josias Stewart, who died childless. On the death of the fourth Baron, his uncle the Hon. John Stewart (d.1685) succeeded to the title as the 5th Baron. After John's death, the title was passed to his nephew, Robert Stewart (1646–1686) of Irry in County Tyrone, the eldest son of Robert Stewart, of Irry, third son of Andrew Stuart, 1st Baron Castle Stuart. The 6th Baron Castle Stuart was the father of Andrew Stewart (1672–1715), who during the wars of the Revolution was taken to Scotland. At the age of twelve, he became the rightful heir to the title 7th Baron Castle Stuart, but on returning to Ireland in adulthood he did not think it fit to claim the title as the land that had once gone with it was no longer his, having been given as a dowry to the previously mentioned Earl of Suffolk. Instead, the de jure 7th Baron made his home at Irry, which he renamed Stuart Hall, near Stewartstown, County Tyrone. His son, Robert Stewart (1700–1742) of Stuart Hall, for the same reasons as his father, chose not to become the 8th Baron Castle Stuart. After remaining dormant for 88 years the title Baron Castle Stuart was reclaimed by Andrew Thomas Stewart (1725–1809) of Stuart Hall, the eldest son of the de jure 8th Baron. He successfully petitioned the King and in 1774 became the rightful 9th Baron Castle Stuart. In 1793, he was created 1st Viscount Castle Stuart and in 1800 he was further honoured by being created the 1st Earl Castle Stewart all in the Peerage of Ireland.

Lord Castle Stewart was baptised Andrew Thomas Stewart-Moore. Moore was the maiden name of his paternal great-grandmother, Anne (Moore) Stewart, daughter of William Moore of Garvey, Garvey House and Fassaroe Castle, High Sheriff of County Tyrone, a first cousin of the 1st Earl of Clanbrassil. He only assumed the surname of Stewart by royal licence in 1775. He was succeeded by his eldest son, the second Earl. His eldest son, the third Earl, died childless and was succeeded by his younger brother, the fourth Earl. His only son, the fifth Earl, assumed in 1867 by royal licence the additional surname of Richardson (which was that of his father-in-law). He died without male issue and was succeeded by his first cousin, who became the sixth Earl. He was the second but eldest surviving son of Reverend the Hon. Andrew Godfrey Stuart, fourth son of the second Earl. His two elder sons were both killed in the First World War and he was therefore succeeded by his third son, the seventh Earl, in 1921. He represented Harborough in the House of Commons as a Unionist. He married in December 1920 Eleanor May Guggenheim (eldest daughter of Irene Guggenheim, née Rothschild, and Solomon R Guggenheim). They had four sons. His two elder sons were both killed in the Second World War. The titles were held by his third son, the eighth Earl, from 1961 to his death in 2023.

As of November 2023, the titles are held by the 8th Earl's son, Andrew Stuart, 9th Earl Castle Stewart. Another member of the Stuart/Stewart family was Henry Stewart, 1st Lord Methven. He was a younger son of the first Lord Avondale (of the second creation). The Earldom and Baronetcy of castle Stewart are registered with the Crown Office (now Ministry of Justice), and recorded at the College of Arms, London.

The family seat was Stuart Hall, near Stewartstown, County Tyrone.

Digby Stuart College, one of the constituent colleges of the University of Roehampton, is named also for Janet Erskine Stuart, a granddaughter of a Earl Castle Stewart.

== Lords Avondale (c. 1499) ==
- Andrew Stewart, 1st Lord Avondale (died 1513)
- Andrew Stewart, 2nd Lord Avondale (died 1548) (exchanged lordship and styled Lord Stuart of Ochiltrie from 1542)

== Lords Stuart of Ochiltree (1542) ==
- Andrew Stewart, 1st Lord Ochiltree (died 1548)
- Andrew Stewart, 2nd Lord Ochiltree (c. 1521–1591)
- Andrew Stewart, 3rd Lord Ochiltree (1560–1629) (resigned lordship in 1615 and created Baron Castle Stuart in 1619)

== Barons Castle Stewart (1619) ==
- Andrew Stuart, 1st Baron Castle Stuart (1560–1629)
- Andrew Stewart, 2nd Baron Castle Stuart (died 1639)
- Andrew Stewart, 3rd Baron Castle Stuart (died 1650)
- Josias Stewart, 4th Baron Castle Stuart (died 1662)
- John Stewart, 5th Baron Castle Stuart (died 1685)
- Robert Stewart, 6th Baron Castle Stuart (died 1686) (dormant 1686)
- Andrew Stewart, ''de jure'' 7th Baron Castle Stuart (1672–1715)
- Robert Stewart, ''de jure'' 8th Baron Castle Stuart (1700–1742)
- Andrew Thomas Stewart, 9th Baron Castle Stuart (1725–1809) (reclaimed 1774; created Earl Castle Stewart in 1800)

== Earls Castle Stewart (1800) ==
- Andrew Thomas Stuart, 1st Earl Castle Stewart (1725–1809)
- Robert Stewart, 2nd Earl Castle Stewart (1784–1854)
- Edward Stewart, 3rd Earl Castle Stewart (1807–1857)
- Charles Knox Stewart, 4th Earl Castle Stewart (1810–1874)
- Henry James Stuart-Richardson, 5th Earl Castle Stewart (1837–1914)
- Andrew John Stuart, 6th Earl Castle Stewart (1841–1921)
- Arthur Stuart, 7th Earl Castle Stewart (1889–1961)
- Arthur Patrick Avondale Stuart, 8th Earl Castle Stewart (1928–2023)
- Andrew Richard Charles Stuart, 9th Earl Castle Stewart (b. 1953)

The heir presumptive is the present holder's paternal cousin, Thomas Harry Erskine Stuart (b. 1974).

Line of succession
- Andrew Stuart, 1st Earl Castle Stewart (1725–1809)
  - Robert Stuart, 2nd Earl Castle Stewart (1784–1854)
    - Rev. Hon. Andrew Godfrey Stuart (1812–1889)
      - Andrew Stuart, 6th Earl Castle Stewart (1841–1921)
        - Arthur Stuart, 7th Earl Castle Stewart (1889–1961)
          - Arthur Stuart, 8th Earl Castle Stewart (1928–2023)
            - Andrew Richard Charles, 9th Earl Castle Stewart (born 1953)
          - Hon. Simon Walter Erskine Stuart (1930–2002)
            - (1) Thomas Harry Erskine Stuart (b. 1974)
            - (2) Corin Edward Leveson Stuart (b. 1975)
            - (3) Tristram James Avondale Stuart (b. 1977)
  - Hon. Andrew Godfrey Stuart (1790–1872)
    - Andrew Thomas Stuart (1814–1894)
      - Robert Walter Stuart (1845–1918)
        - Walter Burleigh Stuart (1875–1912)
          - Burleigh Athol Stuart (1904–1982)
            - (4) Ernest Martin Stuart (b. 1935)
              - (5) Conway Athol Stuart (b. 1968)
    - Burleigh William Henry Fitzgibbon Stuart (1823–1905)
      - Godfrey Richard Conyngham Stuart (1866–1955)
        - Robin Charles Burleigh Stuart (1907–1970)
          - (6) Douglas Charles Burleigh Stuart (b. 1940)
            - (7) Andrew John Burleigh Stuart (b. 1967)
              - (8) James William Burleigh Stuart (b. 2006)
      - Burleigh Francis Brownlow Stuart (1868–1952)
        - Burleigh Edward St. Lawrence Stuart (1920–2004)
          - (9) Edward John Burleigh Stuart (b. 1953)
            - (10) Simon Francis Brownlow Stuart (b. 1980)
            - (11) Henry George Burleigh Stuart (b. 1982)

== See also ==
- Duke of Albany (1398 creation)
- Lord Avandale
- Lord Ochiltrie
- Earl of Arran (1581 creation)
