= Andrew Stewart =

Andrew Stewart may refer to:

== Law and politics ==
- Andrew Stewart, 1st Earl Castle Stewart (1725–1809), Irish peer and politician
- Andrew Stewart (American politician, born 1791) (1791–1872), U.S. representative from Pennsylvania
- Andrew Stewart (American politician, born 1836) (1836–1903), U.S. representative from Pennsylvania
- Charles Stewart (diplomat) (Andrew Charles Stewart, 1907–1979), British diplomat
- Andrew Stewart, Lord Ericht (born 1963), Scottish judge, senator of the College of Justice

== Nobility ==
- Andrew Stewart, 1st Lord Avandale (c. 1420–1488), Lord Chancellor of Scotland
- Andrew Stewart, 2nd Lord Avondale (c. 1505–1549), Scottish peer
- Andrew Stewart, 1st Lord Avondale (second creation) (died 1513), Scottish nobleman
- Andrew Stewart, 2nd Lord Ochiltree (c. 1521–1591)

== Religion ==
- Andrew Stewart (bishop of Moray) (1442–1501), Scottish prelate and administrator
- Andrew Stewart (bishop of Caithness, died 1517), bishop of Caithness and Treasurer of Scotland
- Andrew Stewart (bishop of Caithness, died 1541) (c. 1490–1541), Scottish noble and cleric
- Andrew Stewart (minister) (1771–1838), Scottish physician and minister of the Church of Scotland

== Others ==
- Andrew Stewart, American man falsely imprisoned for murder, see Harlem Park Three
- Andrew Stewart (footballer) (1871–1939), Scottish footballer
- Andrew Stewart (economist) (1904–1990), Scottish-born Canadian economist and university administrator
- Andrew Stewart (rugby union) (1913–1989), Scottish rugby union player
- Andrew Stewart (British Army officer) (born 1952), British general
- Andrew Stewart (gridiron football) (born 1965), American gridiron football player
- Andrew J. Stewart (born 1971), cognitive scientist

== See also ==
- Andrew Steuart, MP for Cambridge
- Andrew Stuart (disambiguation)
- Andy Stewart (disambiguation)
