= William James Stuart (British Army officer) =

Anglo-Irish army officer

Major-General William James Stuart
- Born: 14 April 1831
- Died: 8 July 1914 (aged 83); Bunchara Castle, County Donegal, United Kingdom
- Relatives: Robert Stewart, of Irry; Pascoe Grenfell; Pascoe Stuart; George Stewart
- Military career
- Allegiance: United Kingdom
- Branch: British Army
- Rank: Major-General
- Commands: Colonel Commandant Royal Engineers
- Conflicts: Second Opium War

William James Stuart of Drumaspil (14 April 1831 – 8 July 1914) was an Anglo-Irish soldier and gentleman.

== Early life ==
Stuart was born on 14 April 1831 in Bunchara Castle, County Donegal, the son of Hamilton Stuart of Drumaspil, County Tyrone and Jane Wilhelmina Thornton-Todd, daughter of William Thornton-Todd of Bunchara Castle. The Stuarts of Drumaspil descend in unbroken, patrilineal succession from Robert II of Scotland, through his younger son, Robert Stewart, Duke of Albany, through the Stewarts of Avandale and Ochiltree, through Andrew Stuart, 1st Baron Castle Stuart and his younger son Robert Stewart, of Irry. Stuart was educated at Sherborne School and entered the army in December 1849, aged 18.

== Military career ==
Stuart entered the Royal Engineers in December 1849 commissioned as second lieutenant and was promoted to lieutenant in February 1854. He served during the Second Opium War and was promoted to captain in August 1858. He commanded the French Storming Party at the assault on Canton and was congratulated and thanked by the French Naval Commander in Chief Admiral Charles Rigault de Genouilly and he was promoted brevet major. Promoted Brevet Lt Col, November 1871 and Brevet Colonel, October 1877. He was then appointed commanding Royal Engineers and appointed major-general in February 1888. Stuart retired from the British Army in 1891 and was appointed colonel commandant of the Royal Engineers in 1903.

== Family ==
Stuart married in 1859 to Eleanor Dorcas, 5th daughter of Thomas George French, of Marino, County Cork and Charlotte Granville Grenfell, daughter of Pascoe Grenfell, they had issue:

- Charlotte Granville Stuart (9 May 1861 – 8 July 1942), married Lt.-Col. Robert Follett Muter Foster Millington Synge, son of Major Robert Follett Synge.
- Thomas George Stuart-French (11 February 1863 – 29 July 1911)
- Lt Col Claude Houston Stuart French (6 March 1867 – 23 December 1916
- Major Pascoe William Grenfell Stuart (25 October 1868 – 5 February 1954)

Stuart died on 8 July 1914, in Woolwich.
