= List of acts of the Parliament of Scotland from 1542 =

This is a list of acts of the Parliament of Scotland for the year 1542.

It lists acts of Parliament of the old Parliament of Scotland, that was merged with the old Parliament of England to form the Parliament of Great Britain, by the Union with England Act 1707 (c. 7).

For other years, see list of acts of the Parliament of Scotland. For the period after 1707, see list of acts of the Parliament of Great Britain.

== 1542 ==
The 1st parliament of Mary, held in Edinburgh from 12 March 1542.

Short title, or popular name	Citation	Royal assent
Long title
Lord Governor Act 1542 (repealed)	1542 c. 1 (Note: This is the citation in the Record Edition.) — (Note: This act is not listed in the Duodecimal Edition.)	13 March 1542
Declaratioun tuiching James erle of Arrane lord hammiltoun (Note: James Hamilton, Duke of Châtellerault.) secund persoun of this realme and tutour lauchfull to the quenis grace and governour of this realme. Declaration touching James, earl of Arran, lord Hamilton, second person of this realm and lawful tutor to the queen's grace, and governor of this realm. (Repealed by Statute Law Revision (Scotland) Act 1906 (6 Edw. 7. c. 38))
Lord Governor (No. 2) Act 1542 (repealed)	1542 c. 2 —	13 March 1542
Patificatioun of the aithis gevin to the lord governour. Pacification of the oaths given to the lord governor. (Repealed by Statute Law Revision (Scotland) Act 1906 (6 Edw. 7. c. 38))
Embassy to England Act 1542 (repealed)	1542 c. 3 —	13 March 1542
Tuiching the depesche of the imbassatouris to the king of Ingland for contracting of peise and marriage. Touching the despatch of the ambassadors to the king of England for contracting of peace and marriage. (Repealed by Statute Law Revision (Scotland) Act 1906 (6 Edw. 7. c. 38))
Lord Governor (No. 3) Act 1542 (repealed)	1542 c. 4 —	15 March 1542
Of ane testimoniale to be made of the tua actis anentis my lord governour. Of a testimonial to be made of the two acts regarding the lord governor. (Repealed by Statute Law Revision (Scotland) Act 1906 (6 Edw. 7. c. 38))
Lord Ochiltree Act 1541 Not public and general	1542 c. 5 —	15 March 1542
Creatioun of Lord Stewart of Vchiltre. (Note: Andrew Stewart, 2nd Lord Avondale.); Creation of Lord Stewart of Ochiltree.
Scott's Restoration Act 1451 Not public and general	1542 c. 6 —	15 March 1542
Restoratioun of Walter Scott of Branxhelme (Note: Walter Scott of Branxholme and Buccleuch.) knycht. Restoration of Walter Scott of Branxholme, knight.
Privy Council Act 1542 (repealed)	1542 c. 7 —	15 March 1542
The namis of the lordis to be upoun my lord governoris secrete counsale. The names of the lords to be on the lord governor's secret council. (Repealed by Statute Law Revision (Scotland) Act 1906 (6 Edw. 7. c. 38))
Queen's Person Act 1542 (repealed)	1542 c. 8 —	15 March 1542
The lordis nemmit for keping of the quenis grace. The lords named for keeping of the queen's grace. (Repealed by Statute Law Revision (Scotland) Act 1906 (6 Edw. 7. c. 38))
Queen's Person (No. 2) Act 1542 (repealed)	1542 c. 9 —	15 March 1542
Anentis the place quhar the quenis grace sall remane. Regarding the place where the queen's grace shall remain. (Repealed by Statute Law Revision (Scotland) Act 1906 (6 Edw. 7. c. 38))
Heresy Act 1542 (repealed)	1542 c. 10 —	15 March 1542
Additioun to the actis intitulate "of personis abjurit of heresy." (Note: Heresy Act 1540 (March c. 6)); Addition to the act intituled "Of persons abjured of heresy." (Repealed by Statute Law Revision (Scotland) Act 1906 (6 Edw. 7. c. 38))
Heresy (No. 2) Act 1542 (repealed)	1542 c. 11 —	15 March 1542
Additioun to the act intitulate "of the fugitevis suspect and summond of herese." (Note: Heresy (No. 2) Act 1540 (March c. 7)); Addition to the act intituled "Of the fugitives suspected and summoned of heresy." (Repealed by Statute Law Revision (Scotland) Act 1906 (6 Edw. 7. c. 38))
Bible in Vulgar Tongue Act 1542 (repealed)	1542 c. 12 —	15 March 1542
Anent haifing the haly write baith the new testament and the auld in the vulgar toung. Regarding having the holy scripture both the New Testament and the Old in the vulgar tongue. (Repealed by Statute Law Revision (Scotland) Act 1906 (6 Edw. 7. c. 38))
Treason of Persons Deceased Act 1542 (repealed)	1542 c. 13 —	15 March 1542
Of actiounis of tresoun aganis the aris of persounis deceisit. Of actions of treason against the heirs of deceased persons. (Repealed by Statute Law Revision (Scotland) Act 1906 (6 Edw. 7. c. 38))
Passing of Signatures Act 1542 (repealed)	Vol II, p. 424; 1542 c. 1 (Note: This is the citation in the Duodecimal Edition.)	15 March 1542
(Repealed by Statute Law Revision (Scotland) Act 1906 (6 Edw. 7. c. 38))

=== Sources ===
- Alexander, William (1841). "Acta Parliamentorum Mariæ Reginæ". An Abridgement of the Acts of the Parliaments of Scotland. Edinburgh: Adam and Charles Black. p. A17 – via Google Books.
- Alexander, William (1841). "Acta Parliamentorum Mariæ Reginæ". An Abridgement of the Acts of the Parliaments of Scotland. Edinburgh: Adam and Charles Black. p. A17 – via Google Books.
- Chronological Table of the Statutes. London: Her Majesty's Stationery Office. 1972. p. 1331 – via Google Books.
- "Index of Statutes: Mary I (1542-1567)". Records of the Parliaments of Scotland to 1707. University of St Andrews.

== See also ==
- List of legislation in the United Kingdom
- Records of the Parliaments of Scotland
