= Robert Stewart, of Irry =

Robert Stewart of Irry (1612–1662) was a member of the British landlord establishment in Ireland as well one time Irish rebel. A colonel in the army, he was a prominent figure in the Irish Rebellion of 1641 and afterwards defended against the Cromwellian conquest of Ireland as Governor of the Castles of Antrim and Toome. His home outside Stewartstown, County Tyrone - Irry, sometimes also spelt Eary (modern-day townland of Eary Lower, Donaghenry parish) - was later renamed Stuart Hall by his grandson, the 7th Baron Castle Stewart. He died at Roughan Castle.

== Parents ==
In the many histories written on his family, Colonel the Hon. Robert Stewart of Irry is always described as the third and youngest son of Andrew Stewart, 3rd Lord Ochiltree and afterwards the 1st Baron Castle Stewart by his wife Margaret, daughter of Sir John Kennedy of Blairquhan Castle, Ayrshire. According to R.G.S. King, the Colonel's father was first cousin of 1st Baron Castle Stewart. King puts forward plausible evidence that Colonel Stewart was in fact the son of William Stewart of Fiugh and Mary O'Neill (d.1615), daughter of Sir Cormac O'Neill, son of Conn O'Neill, 1st Earl of Tyrone. He states that William of Fiugh was the son of Robert (uncle of the 1st Baron Castle Stewart/3rd Lord Ochiltree) who was the fifth son of Andrew Stewart, 2nd Lord Ochiltree. His evidence is based on a pedigree drawn up by James Stewart for his father George Roe Stewart of Termon and Canon John Grainger's pedigree of the Edwards family of Castlegore, County Tyrone.

== Irish Rebellion of 1641 ==
His first marriage to Catherine O'Neill, granddaughter of Hugh O'Neill, Earl of Tyrone, directly allied him to the Catholic leaders of the Irish Rebellion of 1641. Stewart was duly appointed an officer in the rebel forces by his wife's cousin, the leader of the rebellion, Sir Felim O'Neill of Kinard. It appears that he switched alliances during the Rebellion. he relieved the Fort of Dungannon, and that of Mountjoy Castle, when at point of surrender to the rebels. Attacking the besiegers with a very inferior force, he dispersed them and drove them back into the mountains of Altadesert and Slieugallen (Slieve Gallion). His early activities against the victorious English miraculously managed to escape their notice until twelve years later, by which time he had become a loyal servant of Parliament. He was exonerated from having played any part in support of the Rebellion, and therefore retained both his land and his life.

== Cromwellian invasion ==
Following the Rebellion, Colonel Stewart was appointed Governor of the Castles of Antrim and Toome. He defended both forts until the final settlement of Ireland under Oliver Cromwell in 1649, when he was forced to capitulate on honourable terms to General Robert Venables. He died at Roughan Castle, which he had inherited from his elder brothers.

== Family and the Barons Castlestewart ==
Robert Stewart left no children by his first marriage. His second wife, Jane, allegedly the daughter of James Richardson of Castle Hill. Robert and Jane Stewart were the parents of four children. At the age of twelve, their eldest son, Andrew, became the rightful heir to the family title, Baron Castle Stewart, passed down from Andrew's uncle. In consequence of the principal family estate, Castle Stewart, having been taken away by the daughter (who conveyed the estates to her husband, Henry Howard, 5th Earl of Suffolk) of Andrew's first cousin, the 3rd Baron Castlestewart, Andrew did not think it fit to claim the title. The title remained dormant until Andrew's grandson, Andrew Thomas Stewart (1725–1809), successfully petitioned George III and restored the family title in 1774, becoming the 9th Baron Castle Stewart. Though the 9th Baron was unsuccessful in his attempt to establish his claim to the Barony of Ochiltree (created for his ancestor in 1543), in 1793 he was created 1st Viscount Castle Stuart, and then in 1800, the Earl Castle Stewart of County Tyrone.
