= Ochiltree Castle, East Ayrshire =

Castle in East Ayrshire, Scotland

Coordinates: 55.4801°N 4.3781°W

Ochiltree Castle (meaning: "the lofty dwelling-place") was a castle built on a promontory by the Lugar Water, East Ayrshire, Scotland across from Auchinleck Castle. Built by the de Colville family in the 12th century, it was destroyed in 1449, by Sir William Douglas.

The ancient barony of Ochiltree belonged to the family of Colville, who were Normans that came to Scotland about 1174. The castle stood on the bank of the Lugar, upon a high, rocky bank. The Castle of Ochiltree was captured by Douglas in 1449, and Colville and his male retainers slaughtered and his lands laid waste. This was an act of retaliation for the slaughter, by the hand of Colville, of Auchinleck of Auchinleck, a friend of Douglas.

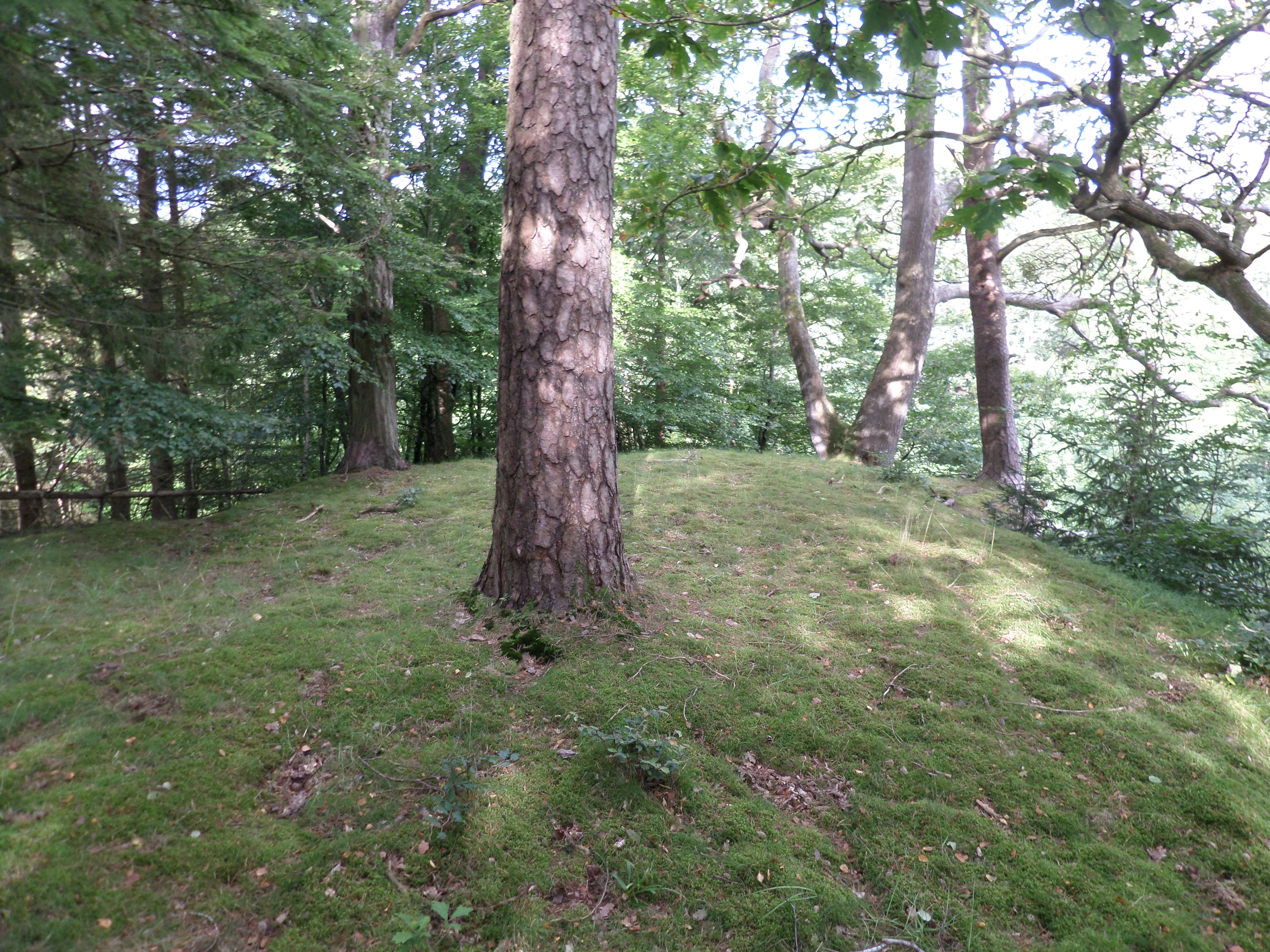
The summit of the Ochiltree motte

After the castle was destroyed, all of the stones from the ruin were carried away, reused in building houses and dykes on the adjoining farms. In 1530, it was exchanged by Sir James Colville with Sir James Hamilton of Finnart for the barony of East Wemyss in Fife. In 1534, it was exchanged by its new owner with Andrew Stewart, Third Lord Evandale, for the barony of Evandale. After the latter exchange, Stewart was created first Lord Ochiltree. Two interesting circumstances are related in the history of the old castle. One is the marriage of John Knox, there, in March, 1564, to Margaret Stewart, daughter of Lord Ochiltree; and the other is the marriage of John Graham of Claverhouse, to Jane Cochrane, niece of Sir John Cochrane, which was celebrated at the castle in June, 1684.

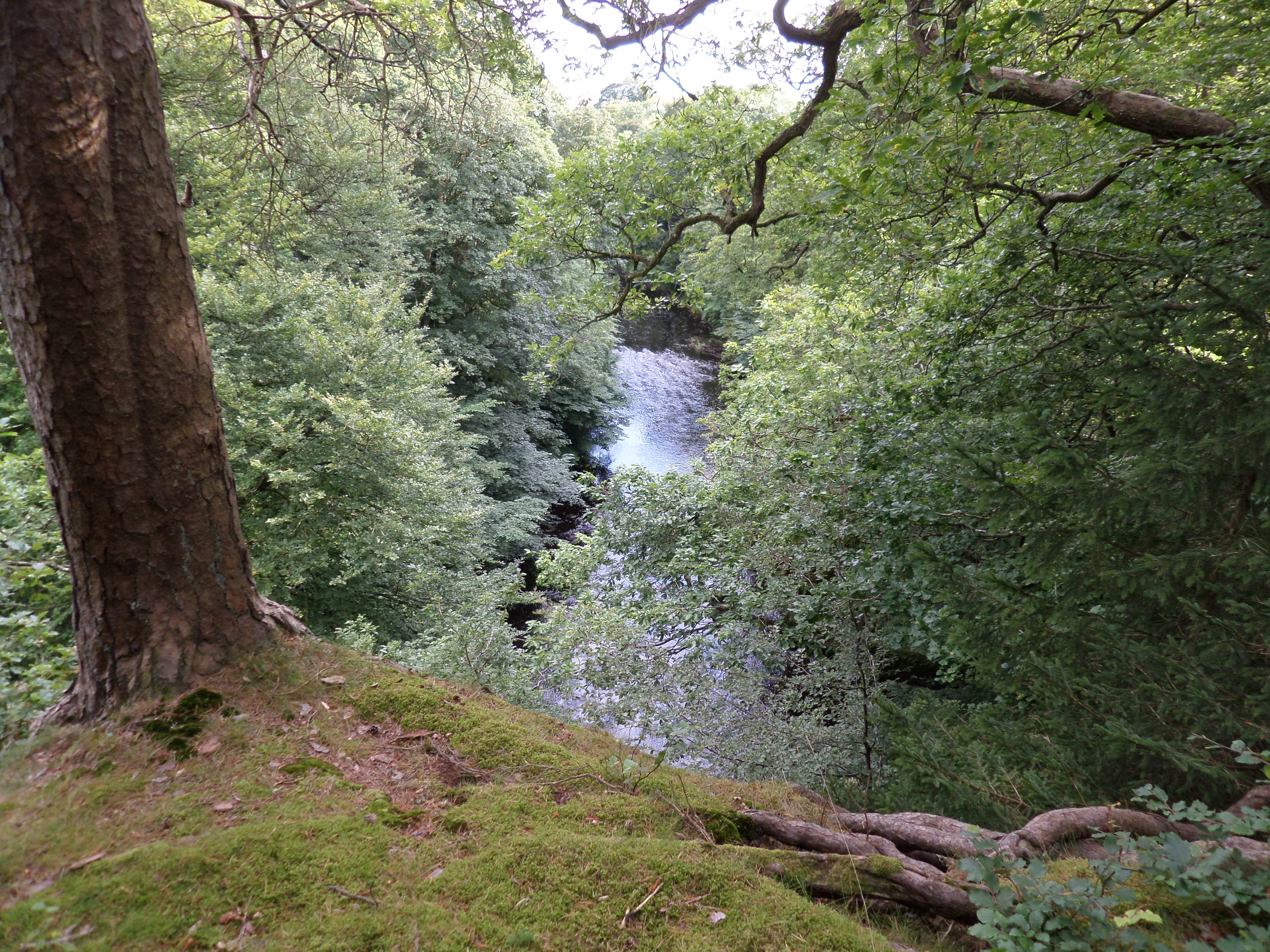
The view of the River Lugar from the motte summit

The peerage of Ochiltree became dormant in 1675, and the barony passing through many hands, went into the possession of the first Earl of Dundonald, who bestowed it upon his second son, Sir John Cochrane. It was forfeited by Sir John in 1685, but re-acquired by his son from the Crown in 1686, was purchased from the Cochrane family about 1737 by Governor James Macrae, who left it to Miss Macquire, afterwards Countess of Glencairn through her marriage to the 13th Earl. It was finally re-sold about 1817 in lots to different proprietors. The castle is said to have been destroyed by fire, together with all the charters, plates and other valuables.
