= Stuart Hall, County Tyrone =

Former country house in County Tyrone

Stuart Hall, or Stewart Hall, was a country house on the outskirts of Stewartstown, County Tyrone, in Northern Ireland. It was the seat of the Earls Castle Stewart until its destruction by the Provisional Irish Republican Army (IRA) in 1972.

== History ==
The house at Stuart Hall was built by Andrew Thomas Stewart (1725–1809), a descendant of Andrew Stuart, 1st Baron Castle Stuart, who was made Earl Castle Stewart in 1800. Construction work may have started in the 1760s and was complete by 1786. The rectangular, five-bay, three-story house was built in the Georgian style beside a Plantation-era tower house. A large courtyard and stables were added to the west of the house. The tower and the main house were later connected by a 19th-century wing constructed in the Gothic Revival style and a castellated parapet was also added to the main block. The top storeys of the house were later removed in the mid-1900s, giving the house the appearance of a bungalow.

Surrounding the house was an extensive demesne featuring a walled garden from 1832, a folly and a ha-ha. The demesne was transformed into landscaped parkland in the 1770s. The house itself faced to the north-east. To its south-west was a formal canal, later turned into a naturalised lake.

In July 1972, while in the ownership of Patrick Stuart, 8th Earl Castle Stewart, the main house was blown up and extensively damaged by a bomb laid by the IRA as part its targeting of country houses during The Troubles. The ruins were subsequently demolished. The stables survived and are now listed. A bungalow was erected on a site to the north of the original house in 1987.

Stuart Hall is also the name of the townland in which the former house was located.
