= Andrew Stewart, 1st Earl Castle Stewart =

Irish peer and politician

Andrew Thomas Stewart, 1st Earl Castle Stewart (29 August 1725 – 26 August 1809) was an Irish peer and politician, who successfully revived his family's long-dormant title in the Peerage of Ireland.

== Biography ==
Stewart was the son of Robert Stuart (1700–1742) and Margaret Edwards. Born in Stewartstown, County Tyrone, he was baptised with the surname Stewart-Moore; Moore being the maiden name of his paternal great-grandmother, Anne (Moore) Stewart. He was the senior legitimate male-line descendant of Robert II of Scotland. He was also a descendant of Andrew Stuart, 1st Baron Castle Stuart, who had been granted the title Baron Castle Stuart having resigned the title Lord Ochiltree in 1615.

In 1755, Stewart was appointed High Sheriff of Tyrone. In the 1760s, he began significant improvements to the family's estate, including the construction of a new Georgian-style country house at Stuart Hall, County Tyrone.

In the early 1770s, he began petitioning the Irish Parliament to revive the dormant Castle Stuart peerage, and in 1774 his petition to George III was formally accepted. From this point, Stewart was able to attend the Irish House of Lords as 9th Baron Castle Stuart. In 1790, he claimed collatoral rights to vote as Lord Ochiltree in an election of Scottish representative peers; however, his right to do so was disallowed by the House of Lords Committee for Privileges in 1793. That same year, Stewart was created Viscount Castle Stewart, and on 29 December 1800 he was further honoured with the title Earl Castle Stewart; both creations were in the Peerage of Ireland.

On 2 August 1782, Stewart married Sarah Lill, a daughter of Godfrey Lill. This marriage produced four children, including Stewart's successor, Robert.

Political offices
Preceded by James Tisdall	High Sheriff of Tyrone; 1755	Succeeded by Lawrence O'Hara
Peerage of Ireland
New creation	Earl Castle Stewart; 1800–1809	Succeeded by Robert Stewart
New creation	Viscount Castle Stewart; 1793–1809	Succeeded by Robert Stewart
Preceded by Robert Stewart; Dormant since 1686	Baron Castle Stewart; 1774–1809	Succeeded by Robert Stewart
