= Andrew Stuart =

Andrew Stuart may refer to:

- Andrew Stuart, 1st Baron Castle Stuart (1560–1629), Scottish nobleman, soldier and courtier
- Andrew Stuart (1725–1801), Scottish lawyer and politician, MP for Lanarkshire 1774–84, for Weymouth and Melcombe Regis 1790–1801
- Andrew Stuart (Canadian politician) (1785–1840), Canadian lawyer and politician
- Andrew Stuart (seigneur) (1812–1891), Quebec seigneur and judge
- Andrew Stuart (Ohio politician) (1823–1872), U.S. Representative from Ohio, 1853–1855
- Andrew M. Stuart (born 1962), mathematics professor at the University of Warwick

== See also ==
- Andrew Stewart (disambiguation)
- Andy Stewart (disambiguation)
- Stuart Andrew (born 1971), British MP for Pudsey
