= Irene Rothschild Guggenheim =

American art collector, philanthropist (1868–1954)

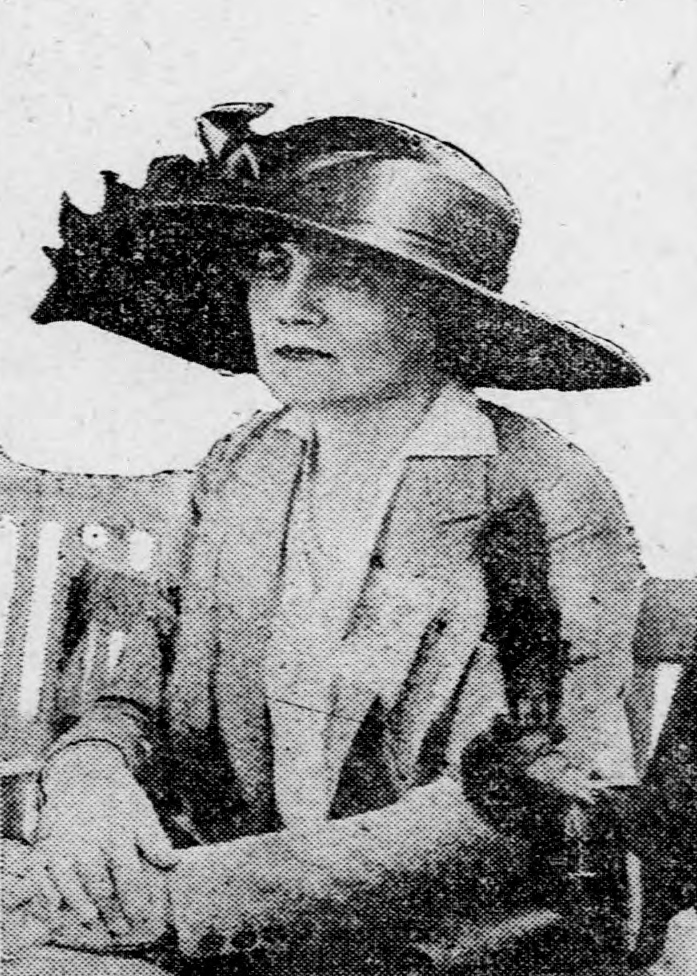
- Irene Rothschild Guggenheim in 1922
- Born: Irene M. Rothschild; December 16, 1868; New York City, New York, U.S.
- Died: November 28, 1954 (aged 85); New York City, New York, U.S.
- Burial place: Fresh Pond Crematory and Columbarium, Queens, New York City, U.S.
- Other name: Mrs. S. R. Guggenheim
- Spouse: Solomon Robert Guggenheim (m. 1895; died 1949)
- Children: 3
- Father: Victor Henry Rothschild
- Relatives: Patrick Stuart, 8th Earl Castle Stewart (grandson)

Irene Rothschild Guggenheim (née Irene M. Rothschild; December 16, 1869 – November 28, 1954) was an American art collector and philanthropist. She was married to Solomon R. Guggenheim, who was of the wealthy Guggenheim family, that founded the Yukon Gold Company in Alaska, among other business interests.

== Early life, family, and education ==
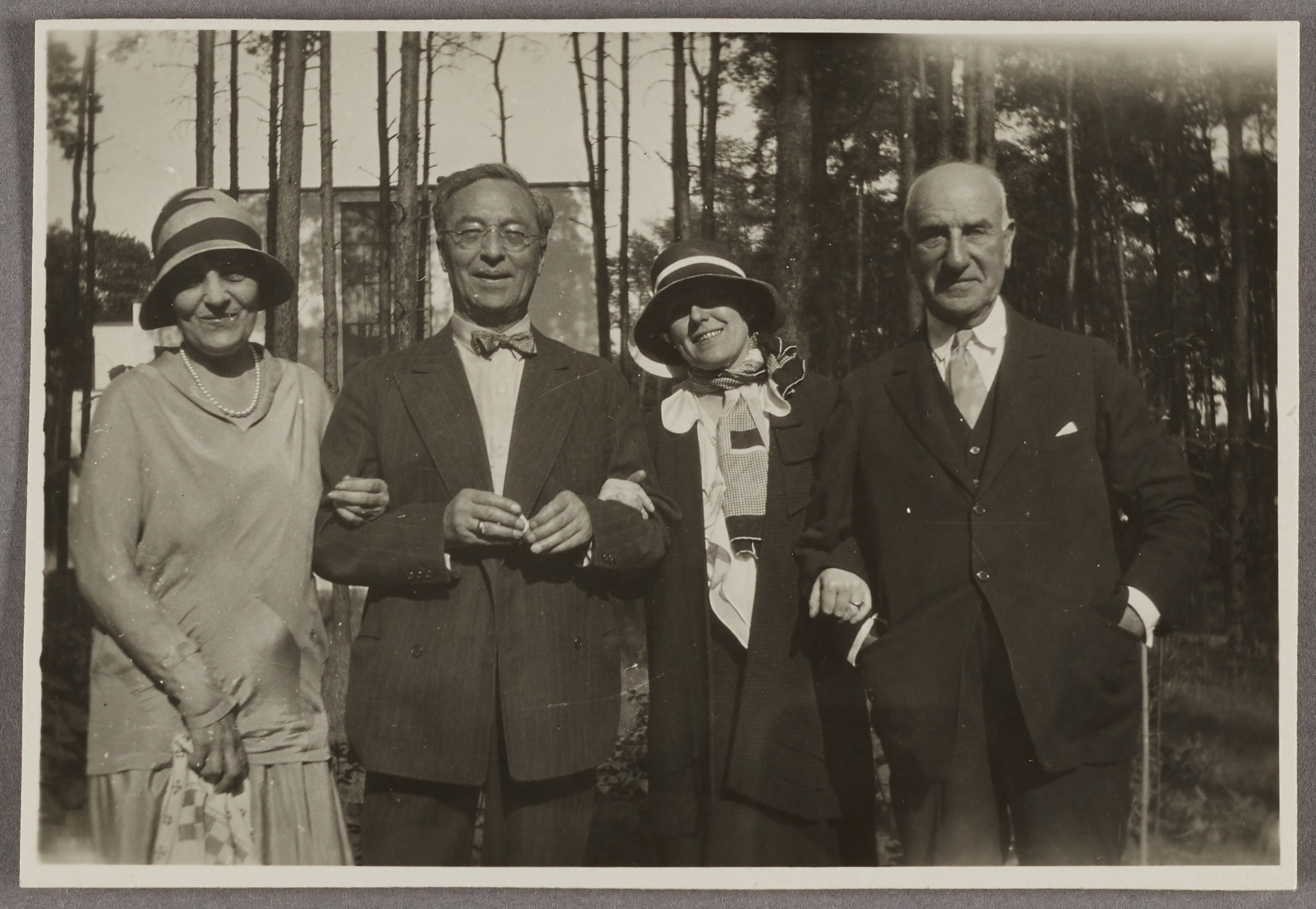
Mrs. Guggenheim with Wassily Kandinsky, Hilla von Rebay, and Solomon R. Guggenheim (1929) in the Bauhaus garden in Dessau, Germany

Irene Rothschild Guggenheim was born as Irene M. Rothschild on December 16, 1868, in New York City. Her parents were Josephine (née Wolf), and Victor Henry Rothschild, they were Jewish and in the apparel manufacturing business. Her father had immigrated from Baden-Württemberg, Germany.

Rothschild attended public schools, and the Female Normal and High School (later known as Hunter College High School). Additionally she attended Miss Lindner’s School in Frankfurt, Germany between 1882 and 1884, and Madame da Silva's private school in New York City.

She was married to Solomon Robert Guggenheim on April 4, 1895, in New York City at the V. Henry Rothschild & Company, her father's manufacturing building. Their children were Eleanor May (1896–1992; later known as Lady Castle Stewart, after her marriage to Arthur Stuart, 7th Earl Castle Stewart), Gertrude Renee (1898–1966) and Barbara Josephine (1904–1985). Her family was part of the Congregation Emanu-El of New York City.

== Career and late life ==
After marriage the family collected art that ranged from Italian Renaissance to the Barbizon School. French painter Antoine Watteau (1684–1721) was well-represented in their collection, and was one of her favorites. Their collection eventually formed the Solomon R. Guggenheim Foundation (1937), and the Solomon R. Guggenheim Museum (1939). Irene had introduced in 1928 her husband Solomon to Hilla von Rebay, the German and American painter, and curator, who was the first director of the Solomon R. Guggenheim Museum.

Guggenheim began doing charitable work with children in New York City in the 1890s. She helped establish in 1894, alongside Ida Clemons, a day nursery for children of Jewish working women, later known as Brightside Day Nursery at 90 Sheriff Street on the Lower East Side. It served as a day nursery for 150 children, and also served as an after-school facility for former children of the program. In the late 1920s, the nursery created the Cannon Street Health Center at 89–91 Cannon Street, which provided nutrition classes, dental and medical services for children and their mothers, and intelligence testing. The Brightside Day Nursery operated until 1948.

She served as the director of the Association of Day Nurseries of New York City, and a trustee of the Federation of Jewish Philanthropies.

== Death ==
She died at age 85 on November 28, 1954, in her home at 740 Park Avenue, New York City. She was buried at Fresh Pond Crematory and Columbarium in Queens, New York City.
