= Robert Colville =

Robert Colville may refer to:

- Bob Colville (born 1963), English footballer
- Robert Colville (died 1584) (1532–1584), Scottish courtier
- Robert Colville (Irish MP) (c. 1625–1697), Irish landowner and politician
- Robert E. Colville (1935–2018), American politician and state judge
- Robert J. Colville (born 1965), American federal judge

== See also ==
- Robert Colvill, the 1st, 2nd and 3rd Lords Colvill of Ochiltree
- Robert Colvile, Director of the Centre for Policy Studies
