= James Stewart, 4th Lord Ochiltree =

Scottish noble

James Stewart, 4th Lord Ochiltree (died 1658) was a 17th-century Scottish noble.

== Career ==
He was the son of James Stewart, Earl of Arran and Elizabeth Stewart. He was baptised 14 March 1583 with James VI of Scotland and the Duke of Lennox as godparents.

Known as James Stewart of Killieth, he was Sheriff of Orkney and Shetland in 1610.

His cousin Andrew Stuart sold the title Lord Ochiltree in 1615 to him. In 1621 he accused Sir Gideon Murray of misconduct in office.

James attempted to found a colony in Cape Breton, Canada in 1629 called Rosemar but was captured by French soldiers and taken to France. In 1631 he became involved in the investigation of treason committed by David Ramsay according to allegations made by Donald Mackay, 1st Lord Reay, and was indicted for slander against James Hamilton, 1st Duke of Hamilton, Thomas Hamilton, 1st Earl of Haddington, Robert Ker, 1st Earl of Roxburghe, and Francis Scott, 2nd Earl of Buccleuch. He was imprisoned in Blackness Castle.

== Marriage and family ==
James married Katherine Kennedy and secondly Mary Livingston, whose son William was 5th Lord Ochiltree.

Peerage of Scotland
Preceded by Andrew Stuart	Lord Ochiltree; 1615-1658	Succeeded by William Stewart
