= Stewartstown, County Tyrone =

Village in County Tyrone, Northern Ireland

Coordinates: 54.58°N 6.67°W

Stewartstown: Irish: An Chraobh
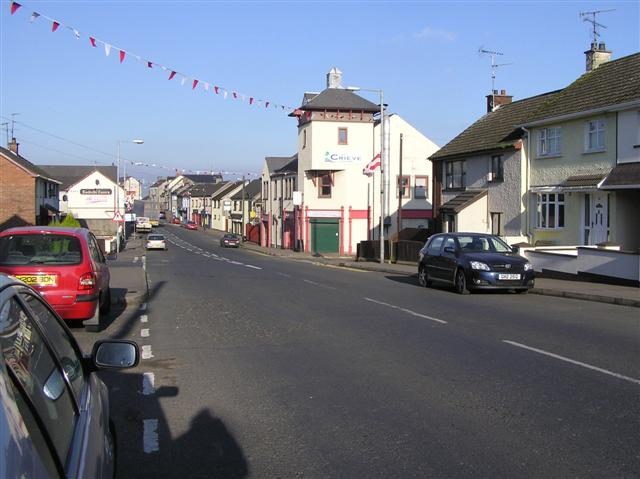
- Looking north towards the main street

- Location within Northern Ireland
- Population: 640 (2021 census)
- Irish grid reference: H8570
  - Belfast: 30 mi (48 km)
- District: Mid Ulster
- County: County Tyrone
- Country: Northern Ireland
- Sovereign state: United Kingdom
- Post town: DUNGANNON
- Postcode district: BT71
- Dialling code: 028
- Police: Northern Ireland
- Fire: Northern Ireland
- Ambulance: Northern Ireland
- UK Parliament: Mid Ulster
- NI Assembly: Mid Ulster

Stewartstown is a village in County Tyrone, Northern Ireland. It is close to the western shore of Lough Neagh, about 5 miles (8 km) from Cookstown, 3 mi (5 km) from Coalisland and 7 mi (11 km) from Dungannon. Established by Scottish Planters early in the 17th century, its population peaked before the Great Famine of the 1840s at over 1000. In the 2021 census the village had a population of 640 people. Formerly in the historic County Tyrone, today it is in local-government district of Mid Ulster.

== History ==
=== 17th century ===
Stewartstown derives its name from Andrew Steuart (or Stewart), Lord Ochiltree, from Ayrshire in Scotland to whom in the Ulster Plantation James I of England (VI of Scotland) granted the surrounding district. In 1608, with a party of just 33 retainers from Scotland, Ochiltree erected a strong bawn of limestone overlooking Lough Roughan (converted by his son Andrew Steuart into a castle) and laid the foundation of a village. The Irish name for Stewartstown, An Chraobh (the branch tree) can figuratively apply to a fort or mansion and is preserved in the name Crew Hill just north of the village.

Following Ochiltree's death in 1629, Roughan Castle and estate passed in succession to Robert Stewart of Irry, a cousin related through both his mother and his (first) wife to the Irish O'Neills. During the 1641 Rising he was appointed to a rebel command under Sir Felim O'Neill of Kinard but in the unfolding War of the Three Kingdoms switched alliances taking a commission from Charles II.

As had the great Hugh O'Neill after the Nine Years War (en route in 1607 in what became known as the Flight of the Earls), at the end of the Cromwellian reconquest of Ireland in 1653 Felim O’Neill took shelter on an old crannog in Lough Roughan. There he was betrayed and captured, with many of his followers drowning in the lough waters.

On the shores of the same lough, the army of James II encamped on their march to Derry in 1689. Following their defeat, in 1694 the Anglican (Church of Ireland) parish church, St Patrick, was built out of the forfeited impropriations by order of William III.

=== 18th century ===
In 1784, during the American War of Independence, the Irish Volunteer supported (Masonic) Yankee Club of Stewartstown voted an address to George Washington. Composed by the Presbyterian minister Thomas Ledlie Birch, it expressed their joy that the Americans had succeeded in throwing off "the yoke of slavery" and suggested that their exertions had "shed a benign light on the distressed Kingdom of Ireland". Washington returned his thanks.

While patriotic sentiment in favour of reform surged again following news of revolution in France, the only action associated with the United Irish insurrection of 1798 witnessed in Stewartstown occurred the previous July. Largely Anglican and Orange Order local yeomanry (joined in the heat of the battle by English and Scottish Fencibles), attacked members of the Kerry Militia, Catholic conscripts whom the government had sought to billet in the village. Several fell on either side. The Kerrymen's final stand is commemorated today by "Kerry House" in North Street and by a headstone erected for "Sergeant Mahoney and privates of the Kerry Militia" in the Roman Catholic graveyard.

=== 19th century ===
In 1837, Samuel Lewis's Topographical Dictionary of Ireland described Stewartstown as "a highly respectable and flourishing little market-town":

The town consists of a spacious square and three principal streets, well-arranged, and the houses well-built of stone and roofed with slate - many of the habitations are large and handsome, several of modern erection, and the whole place has an appearance of cheerfulness and prosperity. The market-house, a handsome building, stands in the centre of the town. Petty sessions are held on alternate Tuesdays, and a court monthly for the manor of Castle-Stewart, in which debts to the amount of 40s. are recoverable. The town at one time carried on an extensive trade in the manufacture of linen and union cloth, and there is still business done of some consideration in this branch; and likewise in lime, quarried in the neighbourhood. The town derives a good inland business for the supply of the neighbourhood, and additional advantages from its situation as a place of thoroughfare.

A new Catholic Church, St Mary's, had just been completed in the then largely Protestant town (replacing a thatched chapel built on the site of an old quarry). Two miles distant there was "an extensive and improved demesne, with a fine park, is Stewart Hall, the seat of Earl Castle-Stewart, who derives his titles of Baron and Earl from this place".

In 1910, the Belfast and Ulster Towns Directory recorded a market town whose 699 inhabitants had their own railway station [closed in 1956] and post office, and six places of worship (3 Church of Ireland, 1 Presbyterian, 1 Wesleyan, and 1 Roman Catholic). Before the onset in the 1840s of the Great Famine and the accelerated emigration that followed, the town had a recorded population (1841) of 1,082.

The land about Stewartstown was fertile and crop yields were high. Full use was made of local limestone, burnt and fed to the land with peat rubble and farmyard dung. But even with the Ulster [tenant-right] Custom, little interest was secured in the land by those who worked it. St Patrick's Church records reveal that it was only after tenant purchase under the Land Acts at the end of the 19th century, that there is inter-generational continuity in the occupation of farms. They also record the departure of the people living in the big houses for Dublin and London because, after the transfers of land to their tenants, they were no longer drawing local rent.

=== 20th century ===
The World War I Cenotaph in the village Square lists 28 district dead, the majority having served with the Irish regiments, the Royal Inniskilling Fusiliers and the Royal Irish Rifles.

After the war, the area saw action by the Irish Republican Army. In 1922 they burned Roxborough Castle in Moy, County Tyrone, the seat of the Earls of Charlemont. James Edward Caulfeild, 8th Viscount Charlemont, the former Viceroy of a now partitioned Ireland, then used Drumcairne House outside Stewartstown for his occasional visits to the county. A late Georgian structure overlooking Coney Island in Lough Neagh, its comparative modesty illustrated the declining presence and importance of the once Ascendant landed families

Over the thirty years from the late 1960s of The Troubles in Northern Ireland at least four people were killed in or near Stewartstown: in 1972 Loyalists bombed the Imperial Bar killing a local Catholic woman; in 1974 the Provisional Irish Republican Army killed two British soldiers with booby trap bomb at an electricity sub-station; and in 1990 Loyalists shot and killed a local man, a Catholic, as he worked on a car in his garage on North Street. After the 1998 Good Friday peace accords, in July 2000 dissident republicans exploded a car bomb outside the police station in Stewartstown. No one was injured. The station closed in 2008.

The village was administered by Tyrone County Council from 1899 until the abolition of county councils in Northern Ireland in 1973. It has been within the district of Mid-Ulster since 2011.

== Places of interest ==
Outside the village are the remains of Roughan Castle. It is a small square structure, 3 storeys high encompassing a central tower, flanked by thick rounded towers at each corner which convert to square rooms in the upper floors. An underground passage ran below the castle and the ground floor of each of the towers have several gun loops.

== Education ==
Local schools include Ballytrea Primary School, St. Mary's Primary School (a Catholic primary school) and Stewartstown Primary School.

== Transport ==
Stewartstown railway station opened on 28 July 1879, closed for passenger traffic on 16 January 1956 and finally closed altogether on 1 June 1958.

== Demography ==
At the 2011 census the usually resident population of Stewartstown Settlement was 650, accounting for 0.04% of the NI total. Of these:

- 19.54% were aged under 16 years and 15.54% were aged 65 and over
- 49.38% of the population were male and 50.62% were female
- 75.85% were from a Catholic background and 23.69% were from a 'Protestant and Other Christian (including Christian related)' background

== See also ==
- List of villages in Northern Ireland
