= Patrick Stuart, 8th Earl Castle Stewart =

Earl in the Peerage of Ireland (1928–2023)

(Arthur) Patrick Avondale Stuart, 8th Earl Castle Stewart (18 August 1928 – 21 November 2023), styled Viscount Stuart from 1944 to 1961, was a nobleman in the Peerage of Ireland.

== Early life and education ==
The third son of Arthur Stuart, 7th Earl Castle Stewart, and his wife Eleanor May, daughter of Solomon Guggenheim and Irene M. Rothschild, he became his father's heir apparent after the death of his two elder brothers during the Second World War. He was educated at Eton College and Trinity College, Cambridge, receiving a Bachelor of Arts degree from the latter in 1950. He was commissioned as a second lieutenant in the Scots Guards on 1 January 1949 and was promoted to lieutenant on 31 May 1951.

== Career ==
From 1967 to 1997, Stuart was vice-president of the Solomon R. Guggenheim Museum, and served on the advisory board of the Peggy Guggenheim Collection as vice-president from 1980 to 2011 and president from 2011 to 2013. He was also a trustee of The Christian Community in the United Kingdom from 1973 to 2001; a fellow of the Chartered Management Institute; and chair of the Foundation for International Security from 2000 to 2007.

== Family ==
In 1952 Stuart married his first wife, Edna Fowler (d. 2003), daughter of the land agent and surveyor William Edward Fowler, of Harborne, Birmingham. They had two children:

- Andrew Richard Charles Stuart, 9th Earl Castle Stuart (b. 1953), who married Annie Yvette le Poulain in 1973 (divorced in 2002) and has one daughter. In 2009 married second wife, Carol Ann Reid, a civil servant from Somerset.
- Bridget Ann Stuart (b. 1957), who married Robert William Wadey in 1990 and has one daughter

In 2004, Stuart married his second wife, Gillian Savill. She was appointed Deputy Lieutenant of County Tyrone in 2010; she is also a freeman of the City of London and a member of the Peggy Guggenheim Collection Advisory Board. Through marriage to Gillian, he has three step-children Elizabeth Maclean, Emma Lochery and Katherine Primus, as well as 3 grandchildren. Following the death of Patrick Stuart in November 2023, his wife is now styled Gillian, Countess Castle Stewart.

Stuart succeeded his father as Earl Castle Stewart in 1961. In 1972 the family seat at Stuart Hall, County Tyrone was targeted by an IRA bomb. In 2013 Patrick lent his DNA to a University of Strathclyde study that confirmed his descent from Walter Stewart, 6th High Steward of Scotland. Thus he was the senior living member of the royal Stewart family, descended in a legitimate male line from Robert II of Scotland.

Stuart died on 21 November 2023, at the age of 95.

Peerage of Ireland
Preceded by Arthur Stuart	Earl Castle Stewart; 1961–2023	Succeeded by Andrew Stuart
