= Pascoe Stuart =

Irish cricketer, soldier and actor

Personal information
- Full name: Pascoe William Grenfell Stuart
- Born: 25 October 1868; Woolwich, Kent, England
- Died: 5 February 1954 (aged 85); Cobh, Munster, Ireland
- Batting: Right-handed

Domestic team information
- Years: Team
- 1904: London County
- 1906: Marylebone Cricket Club

Career statistics
Competition	First-class
Matches	3
Runs scored	67
Batting average	13.40
100s/50s	–/1
Top score	50
Catches/stumpings	2/–
- Source: Cricinfo, 7 October 2021

Pascoe William Grenfell Stuart (25 October 1868 — 5 February 1954) was an Irish actor, colonial administrator, first-class cricketer and British Army officer.

The son of the British Army General William James Stuart, he was born at Woolwich in October 1868. Pascoe was educated at Sherborne School, where at the age of 15 he was the youngest member of the Sherborne cricket eleven. Upon leaving Sherborne, Stuart began a stage career as a solo sopranist, where he featured at The Crystal Palace in the 1880s. He also took up acting, starring alongside Charles Wyndham in the play David Garrick. Stuart was also commissioned as a lieutenant in the King's Royal Rifle Corps. Alongside his acting commitments, Pascoe still found time to play cricket in Ireland for Cork County Cricket Club and played a minor match for Ireland against I Zingari in 1892, as a replacement for David Trotter. A change in career followed for Stuart, with him abandoning his stage career to pursue a career as a colonial administrator. He firstly served as the private secretary to the Governor of the Windward Islands, before being appointed as aide-de-camp in 1896 to the Governor of Queensland, a role he held until 1902.

He returned to Ireland in 1902 and resumed playing for County Cork, where he regularly opened the batting alongside William Harman. Good form for Cork County saw Stuart recalled to the Ireland team as a late replacement for Oscar Andrews in their match against W. G. Grace's London County at The Mardyke in 1903. His batting in the match, during which he scored 55 in the Irish first innings, led to Grace inviting Stuart to come to England to play for London County. He did so the following year, making his debut in first-class cricket for London County against the Marylebone Cricket Club (MCC) at Lord's, with him also featuring in a second match in the same year against Surrey at The Oval. Although he failed to impress in his first match, in the second match against Surret he top scored in London County's second innings with 50. In that same summer, Stuart captained Ireland against Cambridge University, following a number of late withdrawals which included the regular captain Sir Tim O'Brien. His Irish career came to an end that summer, but was almost resumed in 1910 when Stuart was selected to captain Ireland against Scotland, but he was unable to fulfill the fixture and was replaced as captain by Jack Meldon.

With the onset of the First World War, Stuart was called up for military service with the Remounts as part of the Royal Army Service Corps, where it was noted that Stuart and Sir Tim O'Brien, who was also serving in the Remounts, had a fractious relationship. He was a temporary captain by the latter stages of the war and was made an acting major in January 1918. In August of the same year he was appointed a superintendent of a Remount Depot, a role he vacated in February 1919. In the same month his war service came to an end, with Pascoe being granted the full rank of major. Following he war, he returned to Ireland where he stayed following the Irish War of Independence, settling at Cobh. He died there in February 1954. He had assumed the additional surname of French under Royal License in 1917.

== Family ==
Stuart married Elizabeth Julia Soames, daughter of James Kolle Soames. Stuart and Soames had two children:

- Lt Col. Robert Fitzroy Hamilton Pascoe Stuart-French of the 11th Hussars, married Eileen de Grey D'Arcy, widow of Henry Staveley-Hill.
- Margaret Gwendolin Wanda Stuart-French, married Colonel Peter Wilson of the 1st Royal Dragoons (cousin of Sir Leslie Orme Wilson and of Cecil Wilson) and had one son, Leslie Peter Stuart Wilson also temporarily of the 1st Royal Dragoons who married Philippa Felicia Goldwyre Lester, widow of Cecil Davidge.

Pascoe Stuart-French died at Marino House, Cobh on 5 February 1954. Following his death Marino went to his only son, Lt Col. Robert Stuart-French.
