= Victor Henry Rothschild =

American businessman

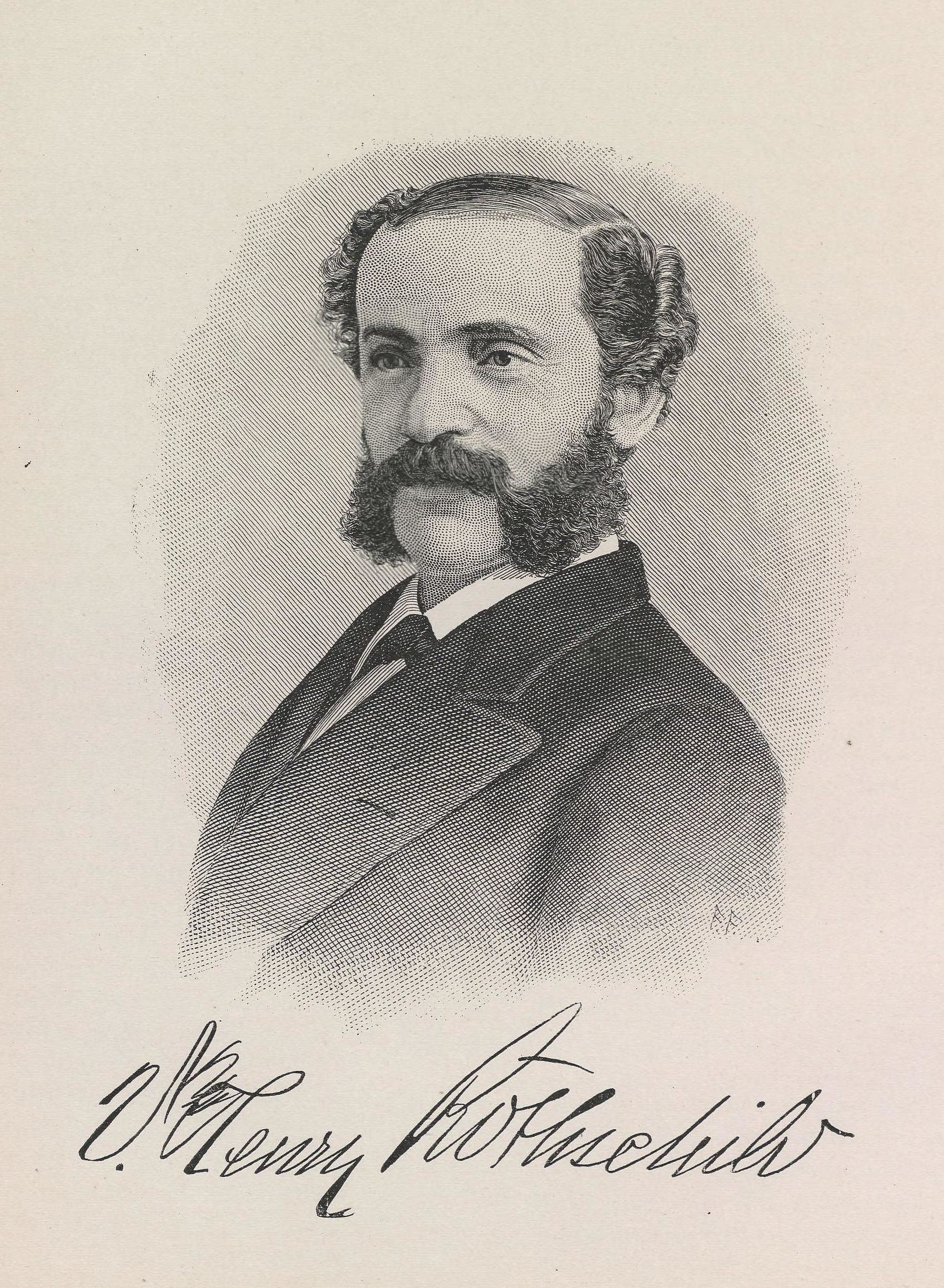
- Born: April 6, 1835; Nordstetten, Baden-Württemberg, Germany
- Died: May 16, 1911 (age 76); New York City, New York, U.S.
- Known for: Founder of V. Henry Rothschild & Co
- Spouse: Josephine Wolfe
- Children: 5, including Irene
- Relatives: Solomon R. Guggenheim (son-in-law); Ira Nelson Morris (son-in-law)

Victor Henry Rothschild or V. Henry Rothschild (April 6, 1835 – May 16, 1911) was an American businessman. He was the founder of V. Henry Rothschild & Company, an apparel manufacturing business in New York.

== Biography ==
Victor Henry Rothschild was one of seven children born to a Jewish family on April 6, 1835, in Nordstetten, Baden-Württemberg, Germany. His father owned a small retail store.

In 1852, he immigrated to the United States, settling in Oakland, California. He started as a traveling optical goods salesman using a wagon as a store which soon morphed into a general goods distributor to both individuals and small stores.

In 1854, at the invitation of his brother-in-law, he moved to Mount Carroll, Illinois, where they opened a retail store in Rothschild's name all the while he kept his distribution business operating. His ventures were successful and his brother Marx emigrated from Germany to join the business. The Panic of 1857 resulted in the failure of their business and the brothers moved first to Macon, Georgia, and then to Hawkinsville, Georgia where they opened a small retail store. The advent of the American Civil War required that he shutter his business and he moved to New York City while his brother returned to Germany to care for their ailing father.

He used his savings to settle some $38,000 in debt in his name that was incurred by his brother-in-law. Once settled, he was able to start a new business manufacturing négligée shirts then a new trend. His brother returned from Germany and the business - known as Rothschild Brothers - expanded greatly. The company was renamed Rothschild Brothers & Gutman after they took Simeon Gutman as a partner; in 1877, the partnership was dissolved and the business continued operating as V. Henry Rothschild until in 1880, the name changed to V. Henry Rothschild & Co with Isaac Dreyfus as a partner. The company grew to over 7,000 employees with factories in New York and New Jersey.

== Personal life ==
In 1872, he married Josephine Wolfe, daughter of Jacob Wolfe. They had five children: Irene M. Rothschild (1868–1954), Victor Sydney Rothschild, Gertrude Rothschild, Constance Lily Rothschild, and Clarence G. Rothschild. His daughter Irene was married to Solomon R. Guggenheim; his daughter Constance was married to Ira Nelson Morris; and his son, Victor Sydney was married to Lily Sulzberger.
