= Andy Stewart =

Andy Stewart may refer to:

- Andy Stewart (Australian footballer) (1876–1919), Australian rules footballer
- Andy Stewart (musician) (1933–1993), Scottish singer, songwriter, and entertainer
- Andy Stewart (politician) (1937–2013), British MP for Sherwood, 1983–1992
- Andy M. Stewart (1952–2015), Scottish musician and songwriter, best known for fronting the Scottish folk band Silly Wizard
- Andy Stewart (rugby union) (born 1953), Australian rugby union player
- Andy Stewart (basketball) (born 1961), Australian basketball coach
- Andy Stewart (baseball) (born 1970), Canadian Olympic baseball and former major league catcher
- Andy Stewart (Scottish footballer) (born 1978), Scottish football goalkeeper

== See also ==
- Andrew Stewart (disambiguation)
- Andrew Stuart (disambiguation)
