= Irish parliament =

The parliament of the Republic of Ireland is the Oireachtas.

Irish parliament may also refer to:

== Before partition ==
- Parliament of Ireland, a legislature on the island of Ireland from 1297 until 1800
- From 1801 to 1922 Irish MPs sat in the Parliament of the United Kingdom of Great Britain and Ireland
- Irish Parliament, the legislative body for Ireland that was intended to have been created by the Government of Ireland Act 1914 (Third Home Rule Bill) of 1914
- Dáil Éireann (Irish Republic), the revolutionary parliament of the 1919–1922 Irish Republic

== Following partition ==
=== Republic of Ireland ===
- Parliament of Southern Ireland, the parliament for Southern Ireland from 1920 to 1921
- Oireachtas (Irish Free State), the legislature of the 1922–1937 Irish Free State
- Oireachtas, the legislature of the Republic of Ireland since 1937

=== Northern Ireland ===
- Parliament of Northern Ireland, the legislature of Northern Ireland from 1921 to 1972
- Northern Ireland Assembly (1973), a power-sharing legislature for Northern Ireland from 1973 to 1974
- Northern Ireland Assembly (1982), from 1982 to 1986
- Northern Ireland Assembly, the devolved legislature of Northern Ireland since 1999
