= Solomon R. Guggenheim =

American businessman and art collector (1861–1949)

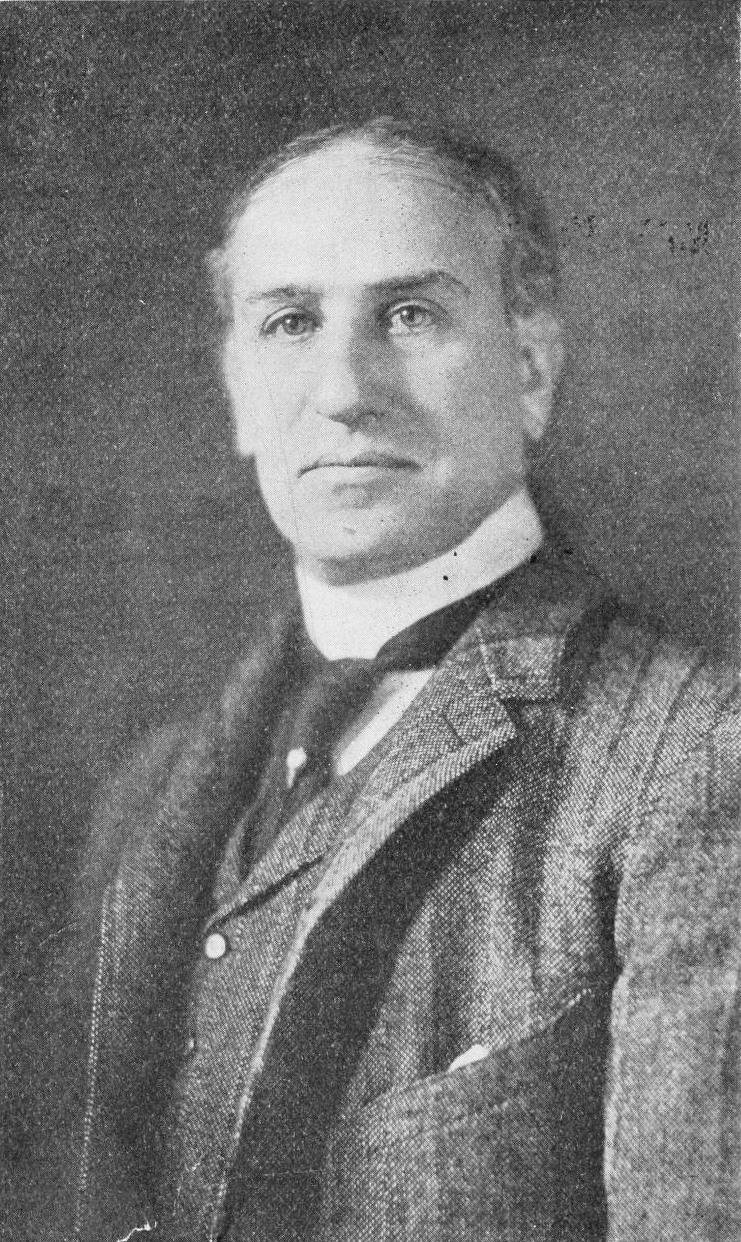
- Born: Solomon Robert Guggenheim; February 2, 1861; Philadelphia, Pennsylvania, US
- Died: November 3, 1949 (aged 88); Long Island, New York, US
- Occupations: Businessman, art collector, philanthropist
- Known for: Solomon R. Guggenheim Foundation; Solomon R. Guggenheim Museum
- Spouse: Irene M. Rothschild (m. 1895)
- Children: 3
- Father: Meyer Guggenheim
- Relatives: Arthur Stuart, 8th Earl Castle Stewart (grandson)
- Family: Guggenheim

Solomon Robert Guggenheim (February 2, 1861 – November 3, 1949) was an American businessman in needlework, gold, silver, copper, and lead and an art collector. He is best known for establishing the Solomon R. Guggenheim Foundation and the Solomon R. Guggenheim Museum in New York City.

Guggenheim was born into the wealthy Guggenheim family, and founded the Yukon Gold Company in Alaska, among other business interests. He began collecting art in the 1890s, and he retired from his business after World War I to pursue art collecting. He eventually focused on modern art under the guidance of artist Baroness Hilla von Rebay, creating an important collection by the 1930s and opened his first museum in 1939.

== Early life ==
Guggenheim was born in the Center City district of Philadelphia, Pennsylvania, son of German immigrant Barbara Meyer (1834–1900) and Swiss immigrant Meyer Guggenheim (1828–1905), the owner of a Swiss embroidery manufacturing and importing company. Solomon was the brother of Simon, Benjamin, Daniel, and five other siblings. He was of Swiss Ashkenazi Jewish ancestry. In 1879 Meyer Guggenheim bought one-third of a lead and silver mine in Leadville, Colorado, which turned out to be the start of the greatest mining empire in the world at the time, mining metals such as gold, silver, copper, and lead.

After attending public school in Philadelphia, Solomon went on to study German language and business in Switzerland at the Concordia Institute in Zürich. Afterwards, he partnered with his four brothers in the family needlework business M. Guggenheim & Sons and managed its Saxony branch in Germany.

== Career ==
Back in the US, Solomon worked in the family mining business. In 1891, he turned around the Compañia de la Gran Fundición Nacional Mexicana (translation: Great National Foundry Company of Mexico). Guggenheim became the president of the Braden Copper Company in Chile, and in 1906 founded the Yukon Gold Company in the Yukon Territory and Alaska.

== Art collector ==
Inspired by his wife Irene Rothschild, he began collecting works of the old masters in the 1890s. He retired from his business in 1919 to devote more time to art collecting and in 1926, met Baroness Hilla von Rebay. In 1930, they visited Wassily Kandinsky’s studio in Dessau, Germany, and Guggenheim began to purchase Kandinsky's work. The same year, Guggenheim began to display the collection to the public at his apartment in the Plaza Hotel in New York City. Guggenheim's purchases continued with the works of Rudolf Bauer, Marc Chagall, Fernand Léger, and László Moholy-Nagy.

=== Foundation and museum ===
In 1937, Guggenheim established the Solomon R. Guggenheim Foundation to foster the appreciation of modern art, and in 1939, he and his art advisor, Baroness Rebay, opened a venue for the display of his collection, the Museum of Non-Objective Painting, at 24 East 54th Street in New York City. Under Rebay's guidance, Guggenheim sought to include in the collection the most important examples of non-objective art available at the time, such as Kandinsky's Composition 8 (1923), Léger's Contrast of Forms (1913) and Robert Delaunay's Simultaneous Windows (2nd Motif, 1st Part) (1912).

By the early 1940s, the museum had accumulated such a large collection of avant-garde paintings that the need for a permanent building to house the art collection had become apparent. In 1943, Guggenheim and Rebay commissioned architect Frank Lloyd Wright to design a new museum building. In 1948, the collection was greatly expanded through the purchase of art dealer Karl Nierendorf's estate of some 730 objects, notably German expressionist paintings. By that time, the museum's collection included a broad spectrum of expressionist and surrealist works, including paintings by Paul Klee, Oskar Kokoschka and Joan Miró.

The museum was renamed the Solomon R. Guggenheim Museum in 1952, after Solomon Guggenheim's death in 1949. Its new building opened in New York City on October 21, 1959.

== Personal life and death ==
Solomon Guggenheim married Irene M. Rothschild, daughter of Victor Henry Rothschild, in 1895. These Rothschilds were not related to the Rothschild banking family. Solomon and Irene's children were Eleanor May (1896–1992; later Lady Castle Stewart after her marriage to Arthur Stuart, 7th Earl Castle Stewart), Gertrude (1898–1966) and Barbara Guggenheim (1904–1985).

Guggenheim died in 1949 on Long Island, New York.

== Legacy ==
In addition to the New York Museum, the Guggenheim Foundation operates, among other things, the Peggy Guggenheim Collection in Venice, which was established by Guggenheim's niece, Peggy Guggenheim.

== See also ==
- Guggenheim family

== General and cited references ==
- Davis, John H. (1988). The Guggenheims, (1848-1988) : an American epic. New York: Shapolsky Publishers. ISBN 9780944007075. OCLC 906522839.
  - other edition: Davis, John H. (1994) [1989]. The Guggenheims: An American Epic. S.P.I. books. New York: Shapolsky Publishers. ISBN 1561713511. OCLC 1061811907.
- Lawson-Johnston, Peter Orman; Bunting, Josiah (2005). Growing up Guggenheim: A Personal History of a Family Enterprise. Wilmington, Delaware: ISI Books. ISBN 9781932236576. OCLC 60689399.
- Rebay, Hilla (2005). Art of Tomorrow: Hilla Rebay and Solomon R. Guggenheim. New York: Guggenheim Museum. ISBN 9780892073276. OCLC 57692466.
