= Andrew Ker of Faldonside =

Andrew Ker of Faldonside (died 1598) was a Scottish courtier involved in the murder of David Rizzio at Holyrood Palace in March 1566.

== Family background ==
His parents were George Ker of Faldonside and Margaret Haliburton. She was an heiress of Lord Haliburton of Dirleton and a sister of Mariotta Haliburton, Countess of Home. Faldonside or Faldonsyde is near Abbotsford in Roxburghshire, now the Scottish Borders.

== David Rizzio ==
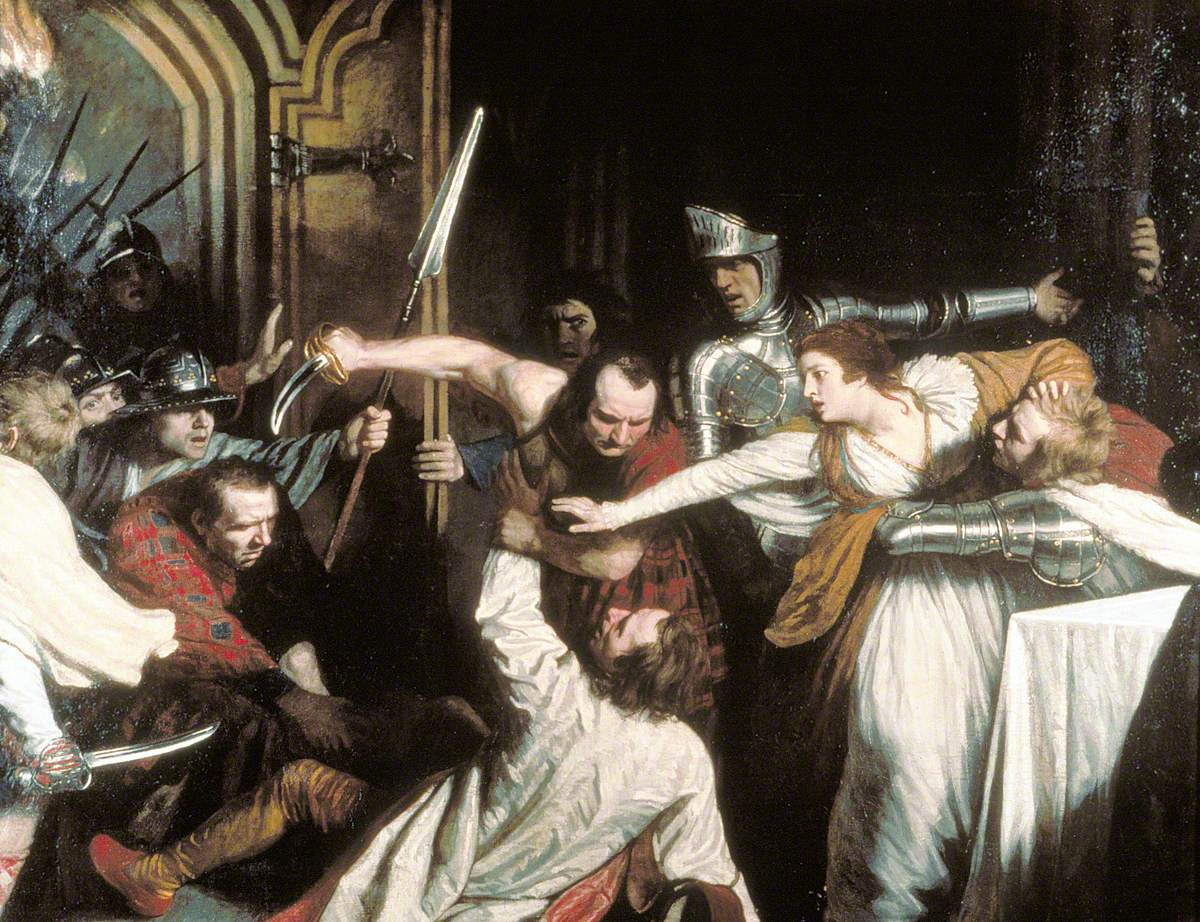
The Murder of Rizzio, 1787, by John Opie

Andrew Ker entered the apartments of Mary, Queen of Scots, at Holyrood on the night of the 9 March 1566 with Lord Darnley. David Rizzio was murdered. According to some reports, Ker threatened the Queen with a dagger and a companion Patrick Bellenden of Stenhouse pointed a pistol at her belly. Two English officials, Thomas Randolph and the Earl of Bedford, wrote that Mary said Ker "would have sticken her with a dagger".

Other accounts say that Ker had a pistol and Bellenden had the dagger. Anthony Standen, an English servant of Darnley, claimed to have disarmed Bellenden of his dagger, while another man threatened Mary with a snaphance pistol. According to the Historie of the reigne of Marie Queen of Scots compiled by Lord Herries, Ker threatened the Queen with a pistol and pulled Rizzio way from her. Subquently, Lord Ruthven and Ker returned to the Queen's chamber, and Ruthven sat down and called for a drink.

Ker was banished after Mary freed herself. According to a memoir of Mary's reign written by her secretary Claude Nau, Mary heard from John Schaw, chamberlain of Kelso, that Ker had returned to Scotland from England without permission and was still "horned as a rebel or outlaw". People refused to have him as a guest, and Ker declared that Mary's regime might end in a fortnight.

After the birth of James VI and I at Edinburgh Castle, according to Lord Herries, Mary discussed her son's future with William Stainley (possibly Darnley's servant Anthony Standen), and told Darnley she would never forget the risk that "Fawdonsyd's pistoll" might have been shot.

Ker was pardoned or given an individual remission for his part in the events at Holyrood on 24 December 1566. A large number of those present at the palace on 9 March or suspected of involvement were included in a general remission made on the same day and issued at Stirling Castle. Ker's remission was similarly worded to that of William White, a shoemaker in the Canongate.

== Battle of Langside ==
Ker is said to fought against Mary's forces at the battle of Langside in 1568, and been taken prisoner by the Clan Eliot. He was held for a time at the house of the Laird of Whitehaugh in Liddesdale. Two accounts of the battle say that he was badly injured.

== Elizabeth Johnston and Margaret Stewart ==
Andrew Ker was first married to Elizabeth Johnston, a daughter of Andrew Johnstone of Elphinstone. Her brother James Johnston was also a conspirator at the murder of Rizzio. The eldest daughter of Andrew and Elizabeth, Margaret Ker, is said to have been known as "Little Ker of Faldonside".

In January 1574, he married Margaret Stewart, the widow of the kirk minister John Knox. It was not usual for women in early modern Scotland in Scotland to change their surnames when they married.

Hume Castle was garrisoned by Regent Morton in 1574 and Ker was involved in paying the soldiers. He was involved with other members of the wider Ker family, including Walter Ker of Cessford, in border administration.

He died on 19 December 1598. His children included John Ker, who was minister of Salt Pans, now called Prestonpans. His date of death is recorded in his will, which was registered in July 1599. He appointed Margaret Stewart to be his executor. The will details the farm stock at Faldonside. He left legacies to Grissel Ker, a daughter of his son David Ker, to his daughter Marie Ker, and to his servant James Ker. Some payments of meal called "hynd bolls" were owed to his shepherds.
