= Lord Colvill of Ochiltree =

Lord Colvill of Ochiltree was a title in the Peerage of Scotland, created by the exiled King Charles II on 4 January 1651.

== Lords Colvill of Ochiltree ==
- Robert Colvill, 1st Lord Colvill of Ochiltree (died 1662)
- Robert Colvill, 2nd Lord Colvill of Ochiltree (died 1671; nephew of the 1st Lord)
- Robert Colvill, 3rd Lord Colvill of Ochiltree (died 1728; son of the 2nd Lord)

On the death of the third Lord, the title probably became extinct. However, it was assumed by

- David Colvill (died 1782; claimed descent from a brother of the 2nd Lord)
- Robert Colvill, cousin of the preceding. He voted at the elections of Scottish representative peers in 1784 and 1787, but his vote in 1788 was disallowed after his supposed descent from the brother of the 2nd Lord was disproved. No claim to the lordship has been made since.

== See also ==
- Ochiltree Castle, East Ayrshire
