= Margaret Knox =

Scottish noblewoman and wife of John Knox (1547–c. 1613)

- Born: Margaret Stewart; 1547; Scotland
- Died: After 1612
- Spouse(s): John Knox; Andrew Ker of Faldonside
- Children: Martha Knox; Margaret Knox; Elizabeth Knox; A number of children by her second husband
- Parent(s): Andrew Stewart, 2nd Lord Ochiltree; Agnes Cunningham

Margaret Knox (née Stewart; 1547 – after 1612) was a Scottish noblewoman and the second wife of Scottish reformer John Knox, whom she married when she was 17 years old and he 54. The marriage caused consternation from Mary, Queen of Scots, as the couple had married without having obtained royal consent.

== Family ==
Margaret Stewart was born in 1547, the daughter of Andrew Stewart, 2nd Lord Ochiltree, and Agnes Cunningham. The family was staunchly Protestant, and also related to the Scottish royal family and the Hamiltons. Margaret had three sisters and four brothers, including James Stewart, Earl of Arran.

== Marriages and children ==
On 26 March 1564, she married her first husband, John Knox, leader of the Scottish Reformation, and a close friend of her father. His first wife, Marjorie Bowes, had died in December 1560, leaving him with two small sons, Nathaniel and Eleazer. The marriage was strongly criticised by Queen Mary, as they had married without having first obtained her consent. Margaret, as the Queen's relative, was required to ask the monarch for permission to marry.

The couple made their home on Edinburgh's Royal Mile, and together they had three daughters:

- Martha Knox (1565–1592), married Alexander Fairlie, by whom she had issue.
- Margaret Knox (b.1567), married Zachary Pont, by whom she had issue.
- Elizabeth Knox (1570- January 1622), married in 1594, John Welsh, minister of Ayr, by whom she had issue.

Margaret served as Knox's secretary, and later, when he became ill, his nurse. Following Knox's death in November 1572, the General Assembly, at the suggestion of the Regent, Morton, allowed Margaret to receive, for the year succeeding her husband's death, his pension of 500 merks.

In January 1574, she married her second husband, Sir Andrew Ker of Faldonside. He had been part of the conspiracy of Protestant nobles, led in March 1566 by Patrick Ruthven, 3rd Lord Ruthven, who had stabbed to death Queen Mary's Italian secretary, David Rizzio in the presence of the Queen, who was almost six months pregnant at the time. It was Ker who had held his pistol at Mary's side, while she was constrained to watch Rizzio's killing.

Together they had a number of children, one of which was named John Ker, minister of Salt Preston.

On 8 April 1574, a Charter of Alienation confirmed Ker's provision for Margaret, in her widowhood, of the liferent of a third of ancestral lands in Haddingtonshire. Kerr died on 19 December 1599, and she did not remarry.

Margaret died sometime after 1612.
