= Andrew Stuart, 1st Baron Castle Stuart =

Scottish nobleman, soldier and courtier

Andrew Stuart, 1st Baron Castle Stuart: Quarterly: 1st, Or a Lion rampant Gules, armed and langued Azure, within a Double-Tressure flory counter-flory Gules (Scotland); 2nd, Or, a Fess chequy Azure and Argent, in chief a Label of three-points Gules (Stuart); 3rd, Argent, a Saltire between four Roses Gules, barbed and seeded proper (Lennox); 4th, Or, a Lion rampant Gules (Macduff); the whole within a Bordure compony Argent and Azure.

Andrew Stewart, 1st Baron Castle Stuart (1560–1629) was a Scottish nobleman, soldier, courtier to King James VI and I and one of the chief undertakers in the Ulster Plantation. Stuart resigned his title "Lord Ochiltree" and was made "Baron Castle Stuart".

== Biography ==
Described as 'a nobleman of impeccable background and proven military ability', he was the only son and heir of Andrew Stewart (d.1578), Master of Ochiltree, and Margaret, daughter of his first cousin Henry Stewart, 2nd Lord Methven of Methven Castle. He was the grandson of Andrew Stewart, 2nd Lord Ochiltree, whose title he succeeded to after his father predeceased his grandfather.

He became a General in the Artillery and held the office of General of Edinburgh Castle. He was appointed to the court position of Gentleman of the Bedchamber to James VI and I on 12 January 1587. On the death of his grandfather in 1591, he became the 3rd Lord Ochiltree and inherited estates in Galloway and Strathclyde.

In August 1592 the king sent him to raid the House of Row in Liddesdale to catch counterfeiters and their coining irons who were working for the rebel Francis Stewart, 5th Earl of Bothwell. He joined forces with his brother-in-law, the laird of Ferniehirst, or Andrew Ker of Jedburgh, and captured two men at Row, a number of 30 shilling coins, and the coining irons in the tower, but the master coiner escaped to England.

He was lieutenant and warden of the West March of Scotland in 1597, and James VI granted him Torthorwald Castle. Torthorwald had belonged to James Douglas of Parkhead who killed Ochiltree's uncle, James Stewart, Earl of Arran.

A warrant from James VI dated July 1598 to the treasurer, Walter Stewart of Blantyre, requests 3,000 merks to be used to redeem jewels belonging to the queen which he had pledged for a loan. The 3,000 merks was given to Andrew Stuart, who paid off the loan (possibly from George Heriot) and redeemed two of the queen's jewels.

In 1608, he was sent by the King to quell feuds in the Western Isles, taking with him his uncle, John Knox. His orders including the destruction of shipping, named in his commissions as lymphads, galleys, and birlinns belonging to rebellious subjects.

Though successful in this campaign, the King had no money with which to reward his military service and instead (in 1609) offered him 3,000 acres of land in County Tyrone, which included the Manors of Castlestewart and later Manor Forward, encompassing the area around Farlough and Roughan, all in the Barony of Dungannon. He was one of the chief 'planters' or 'undertakers' in the Ulster Plantation and in 1611 he settled on these estates. He built houses, farmed the land, constructed Roughan Castle and provided housing and employment for the local populace. He lived at Irry, which was later renamed Stuart Hall by his descendants.

In 1615, with the King's consent, to raise money he resigned the feudal Barony of Ochiltree and sold it to his first cousin, Sir James Stuart, son of James Stewart, Earl of Arran. As compensation, in 1619, James VI and I raised him to the Peerage of Ireland and created him Baron Castle Stewart. No parliament sat between the years of 1615 and 1634, so he never voted in the Irish House of Lords.

== Family ==
In 1587, he married Margaret, daughter of Sir John Kennedy of Blairquhan Castle, Ayrshire. They were the parents of five children:

- Sir Andrew Stewart (1590-1639) 1st Baronet & 2nd Baron Castle Stewart; married Anne, daughter of John Stewart, 5th Earl of Atholl and Marie Ruthven
- John Stewart (d.1685), 5th Baron Castle Stewart; died unmarried
- Robert Stewart, of Irry (1598-1662), County Tyrone; ancestor of the Earls of Castle Stewart
- Margaret Stewart, married George Crawford of Crawfordsburn, County Down
- Maria Stewart, married John Kennedy, ancestor of the Kennedys of Cultra, County Down
- Anna Stewart, died unmarried

Mary Kennedy, Lady Ochiltree helped bring up Princess Elizabeth at Linlithgow Palace.

He is the ancestor of the Earls of Castle Stewart through his third son, Robert Stewart of Irry.

== Ancestry ==
Ancestors of Andrew Stuart, 1st Baron Castle Stuart

16. Andrew Stewart, 1st Lord Avondale (second creation)
8. Andrew Stewart, 2nd Lord Avondale
17. Margaret Kennedy
4. Andrew Stewart, 2nd Lord Ochiltree
18. James Hamilton, 1st Earl of Arran
9. Margaret Hamilton
19. Beatrix Drummond
2. Andrew Stewart
5. Agnes Cunningham
1. Andrew Stuart, 1st Baron Castle Stuart
24. Andrew Stewart, 1st Lord Avondale (second creation)
12. Henry Stewart, 1st Lord Methven
25. Margaret Kennedy
6. Henry Stewart, 2nd Lord Methven
26. John Stewart, 2nd Earl of Atholl
13. Janet Stewart
27. Janet Campbell
3. Margaret Stewart
28. William Ruthven, 2nd Lord Ruthven
14. Patrick Ruthven, 3rd Lord Ruthven
29. Janet Haliburton
7. Jean Ruthven
30. Archibald Douglas, 6th Earl of Angus
15. Janet Stewart

Peerage of Scotland
Preceded by Andrew Stewart	Lord Ochiltree; 1591–1615	Resigned title transferred to James Stewart
Peerage of Ireland
New creation	Baron Castle Stuart; 1619–1629	Succeeded by Andrew Stewart
