= Andrew Stewart, 1st Lord Avondale (second creation) =

Scottish nobleman

Andrew Stewart
- Lord Avondale
- Tenure: c. 1499 – 1513
- Predecessor: Alexander Stewart, 1st Lord Avandale (first creation)
- Successor: Andrew Stewart, 2nd Lord Avondale
- Died: 9 September 1513; Near Branxton, Northumberland, England
- Spouse: Margaret Kennedy
- Issue: Andrew Stewart, 2nd Lord Avondale; Henry Stewart, 1st Lord Methven
- Father: Alexander Stewart

Andrew Stewart, 1st Lord Avondale (died 9 September 1513) was a Scottish nobleman.

He was the son of Alexander Stewart, from whom he inherited the lands of Avondale. Alexander had inherited them from his uncle Lord Avondale, who had in turn received them following their forfeiture by the last Earl of Douglas and Avondale in 1455.

The title Lord Avondale was revived for Andrew Stewart of Avondale in about 1499. He died in 1513, killed at the Battle of Flodden. and was succeeded by his son.

== Marriage and family ==
Lord Avondale married Margaret Kennedy, daughter of John Kennedy, 2nd Lord Kennedy, and their children included:

- Andrew Stewart, 2nd Lord Avondale, who exchanged the Avondale title for Ochiltree and thus became first Lord Ochiltree.
- Henry Stewart, 1st Lord Methven, married to Margaret Tudor as her 3rd husband; her 1st was James IV of Scotland.
- Sir James Stewart of Beath, father of James Stewart, 1st Lord Doune, whose son James Stewart became Earl of Moray.
- Barbara Stewart, who married (1) James Sinclair of Sanday, and (2) in 1541, Roderick MacLeod of Lewis
- David Stewart, married Elizabeth Elphinstone, sister of Alexander Elphinstone, 1st Lord Elphinstone

== Ancestry ==
Ancestors of Andrew Stewart, 1st Lord Avondale (second creation)

16. Murdoch Stewart, Duke of Albany
8. Walter Stewart, Master of Fife
17. Isabella, Countess of Lennox
4. Walter Stewart of Morphie
18. Sir Robert, 1st Lord Erskine
9. Janet Erskine
19. Elizabeth Lindsay
2. Alexander Stewart
10. Laird of Arnot
5. Elizabeth Arnot
1. Andrew Stewart, 1st Lord Avondale (second creation)

Peerage of Scotland
New creation	Lord Avondale c. 1499–1513	Succeeded by Andrew Stewart
