= Andrew Stewart, 2nd Lord Ochiltree =

Scottish Reformation supporter (c. 1521–1591)

Andrew Stewart, 2nd Lord Ochiltree: Quarterly: 1st, Or a Lion rampant Gules, armed and langued Azure, within a Double-Tressure flory counter-flory Gules (Scotland); 2nd, Or, a Fess chequy Azure and Argent, in chief a Label of three-points Gules (Stuart); 3rd, Argent, a Saltire between four Roses Gules, barbed and seeded proper (Lennox); 4th, Or, a Lion rampant Gules (Macduff); the whole within a Bordure compony Argent and Azure.

Andrew Stewart, 2nd Lord Ochiltree (c. 1521–1591) fought for the Scottish Reformation. His daughter married John Knox and he played a part in the defeat of Mary, Queen of Scots at the battle of Langside.

== Biography ==
Andrew's father, Andrew Stewart, 2nd Lord Avondale, exchanged his lands and title to become Lord Ochiltree.

Lord Ochiltree became a Protestant when Scotland was still a Catholic country. When resistance to the Catholic religion and the rule of the Regent of Scotland, Mary of Guise, began to grow, Ochiltree was one of the first of the Lords of the Congregation who marched to Perth in June 1559, and joined up with the rest at Edinburgh by 1 July. Ochiltree was a signatory to the Congregation's letters to Elizabeth I of England and William Cecil on 19 July 1559. John Knox wrote the letters, which state their "whole intent" was to remove superstition and "maintain the liberty this our country from the tyranny and thraldom of strangers." Cecil replied mentioning the example of the polity of Denmark, and wondering what place the Hamiltons, the former Duke of Châtelherault, the Earl of Arran and Lord David Hamilton might have in their scheme.

On 27 April 1560, Ochiltree signed the "Band of the Scottish Nobility", which pledged to expel French troops from Scotland and assist the English army, which had entered Scotland under the terms of the Congregation's Treaty of Berwick. John Knox later wrote in his History of the Reformation in Scotland that Ochiltree was "a man more likely to look for peace than fight in the causeway."

Lord Ochiltree's daughter Margaret married John Knox in 1563. His second son James Stewart became the powerful Earl of Arran in the 1580s. His eldest son Andrew, Master of Ochiltree, died before him, in 1578. The Master of Ochiltree's wife Margaret, Mistress of Ochiltree, was an important royal servant, and at least three of her daughters were ladies in waiting to Anne of Denmark.

Lord Ochiltree died in November 1591. He was succeeded by his grandson, Andrew, 3rd Lord Ochiltree, who later became Andrew Stuart, 1st Baron Castle Stuart.

== Family ==
Andrew Stewart, 2nd Lord Ochiltree married Agnes Cunningham of the Caprington family. Their children, and grandchildren included;

- Andrew Stewart, known as the Master of Ochiltree (d. 1578). He married Margaret Stewart (d. 1627), daughter of Henry Stewart, 1st Lord Methven, who was known as the Mistress of Ochiltree, and was a member of the households of Anne of Denmark and Prince Henry. Their children included;
  - Andrew Stuart, 1st Baron Castle Stuart, who became the 3rd Lord Ochiltree.
  - Josias Stewart of Bonington, who was a supporter of and conspirator with the Francis Stewart, 5th Earl of Bothwell and in 1595 revealed information to the Privy Council of Scotland about a band or league between the Earl and the Catholic rebel Northern earls. He was the executor and administrator of Jean Stewart, Lady Bargany and her son Thomas Kennedy, see below.
  - Mary Stewart (d. 1606), who with her mother was a lady in waiting in the household of Anne of Denmark. She married Roger Aston, an English favourite of James VI who had appointed him Gentleman of the Bedchamber in 1587.
  - Anne Stewart, who married Andrew Kerr, Lord of Jedburgh.
  - Jean Stewart, also a maiden in the household of Anne of Denmark, married her cousin Gilbert Kennedy younger of Bargany. The wedding was celebrated at court with food and music and King James gave her clothes. It was said that James VI compelled the Laird of Bargany to arrange the marriage without a dowry, because he had sided with kirk ministers against him. The queen arranged a loan for the dowry.
  - Margaret Stewart, also a maiden in the queen's household, who married in January 1596 Sir John Stewart younger of Traquair, a son of William Stewart of Caverston.
  - Martha Stewart, who married Nicholas Rutherford of Hundalee.
- James Stewart of Bothwellmuir, who became Lord Chancellor of Scotland and Earl of Arran.
- William Stewart of Monkton, Ayrshire, Provost of Ayr in 1585, murdered by Francis Stewart, 5th Earl of Bothwell in July 1588.
- Henry Stewart of Braidwood.
- Margaret Stewart, who married John Knox on Palm Sunday 1564, aged around sixteen (Knox was around 60). The English diplomat in Scotland, Thomas Randolph noted that she was a near kinswoman of James Hamilton, Duke of Châtellerault, Andrew's mother was the Duke's half-sister. Randolph thought that Cecil would think his report of the marriage madness. They were married on Palm Sunday after the banns had been proclaimed in St Giles, Edinburgh. Randolph wrote that the Queen was angry at the marriage because Margaret was of the royal "blood and name". After Knox died she married Andrew Ker of Faldonside.
- Isobel Stewart, married Sir Thomas Kennedy of Bargany.

Andrew Stewart, 2nd Lord Ochiltree married secondly, Margaret Cunningham, daughter of Alexander Cunningham, 5th Earl of Glencairn, and widow of John Wallace of Craigie.

== Swedish connection ==
Andrew 2nd Lord Ochiltree seems to have had a son with Janet Forbes, John Stewart or Stuart. He entered the service of Sweden and was master of horse to Eric XIV, and had two sons Andrew and John. This branch of the Ochiltree family is introduced at the Swedish House of Lords (Riddarhuset) under the name Stuart. Hans (Johannes) Stuart (d. 1618) obtained a letter of descent in Edinburgh in 1579 and a letter of arms at Holyrood Castle in Edinburgh from King James VI of Scotland in 1585

John Stuart married Brita Eriksdotter Soop, and their daughter Martha Stuart (1606-1653) married a French lieutenant-colonel, Anton Ydron, who was killed at the battle of Nürnberg in 1632 in the Thirty Years' War (1618–48). As a widow Martha Stuart lived on the island of Almö, and was a frequent correspondent of the Swedish chancellor, Axel Oxenstierna, whose castle Tidö Slott was nearby.

== Notes ==
Peerage of Scotland
Preceded by Andrew Stewart	Lord Ochiltree; 1549–1591	Succeeded by Andrew Stewart
