= Andrew Stewart, 2nd Lord Avondale =

Scottish peer

Andrew Stewart, 2nd Lord Avondale: Quarterly: 1st, Or a Lion rampant Gules, armed and langued Azure, within a Double-Tressure flory counter-flory Gules (Scotland); 2nd, Or, a Fess chequy Azure and Argent, in chief a Label of three-points Gules (Stuart); 3rd, Argent, a Saltire between four Roses Gules, barbed and seeded proper (Lennox); 4th, Or, a Lion rampant Gules (Macduff); the whole within a Bordure compony Argent and Azure.

Andrew Stewart, 2nd Lord Avondale or Andrew Stuart, 1st Lord Ochiltree (died 1549), was a Scottish peer.

== Title ==
Andrew was the son of Andrew Stewart, 1st Lord Avondale, a new creation which Andrew surrendered for a new investment as Lord Ochiltree. His seat became Ochiltree Castle in Ayrshire. The original Avondale lands were purchased or exchanged with James Hamilton of Finnart. He exchanged his lands at East Wemyss (which came from his wife or father) with Ochiltree, which belonged to the Comptroller, James Colville. In August 1534, Finnart made the exchange with Lord Avondale for the barony of Avandale. Andrew was confirmed as Lord Avondale by Regent Arran, Finnart's half-brother, on 12 March 1543.

== Activities ==
Andrew attended Parliaments in 1524 and 1525. When James V first assumed power by escaping from the Douglas family and joining his mother at Stirling Castle, Avondale was one of eight lords and earls who came to advise them. Margaret Tudor noted they had not kept court since the murder of the Earl of Lennox in 1526. Avondale also accompanied James to Edinburgh in July 1528, and attended the September parliament.

The English physician Andrew Boorde visited Scotland in 1536 and wrote that he frequented the house of the Earl of Arran and Lord Avondale. A 'Lord Ochiltree,' probably Andrew, sat on the trial that condemned Janet Douglas, Lady Glamis for treason on 8 July 1537.

== Family ==
Andrew married Margaret Hamilton, a daughter of James Hamilton, 1st Earl of Arran, Their children included:

- Andrew Stewart, 2nd Lord Ochiltree, father of Margaret who married John Knox
- James Stewart

The marriage of Margaret Stewart to John Knox in 1563 angered Mary, Queen of Scots, because she was of "the blood and name".

== Brothers ==
Andrew's brother was created Henry Stewart, 1st Lord Methven on his marriage to the King's mother Margaret Tudor. Another brother James was made Captain of Doune Castle and Forester of Glenfinglas and Menteith on 14 July 1528. James's son became James Stewart, 1st Lord Doune, whose son in turn became James Stewart, 2nd Earl of Moray

Peerage of Scotland
Preceded by Andrew Stewart	Lord Avondale; 1513–1543	Exchanged title for Lord Ochiltree
New creation	Lord Ochiltree; 1543–1549	Succeeded by Andrew Stewart
