= Lord Ochiltree =

Lord Ochiltree Act 1541
- Act of Parliament
- Parliament of Scotland
- Long title: Creatioun of Lord Stewart of Vchiltre.
- Citation: 1542 c. 5

Dates
- Royal assent: 15 March 1542

Arms of the Stuarts of Ochiltree

Lord Ochiltree (or Ochiltrie) or Lord Stuart of Ochiltree was a title in the Peerage of Scotland. In 1542, Andrew Stewart, 2nd Lord Avondale (see the Earl Castle Stewart for earlier history of the family) exchanged the lordship of Avondale with Sir James Hamilton for the lordship of Ochiltrie and by an act of Parliament, the Lord Ochiltree Act 1541 (c. 5), was ordained to be styled Lord Stuart of Ochiltrie. His great-grandson, the third Lord Stuart of Ochiltrie, resigned the feudal barony of Ochiltree and the peerage to his cousin, James Stewart, with the consent of the Crown in 1615. In 1619, he was instead elevated to the Peerage of Ireland as Baron Castle Stewart; see the Earl Castle Stewart for further history of this branch of the family.

James Stewart now became the first or fourth Lord Ochiltrie (or Lord Stewart of Ochiltrie). He was succeeded by his son William, the second or fifth Lord. On his early death in 1675 the lordship became either dormant or extinct.

In 1774, Andrew Thomas Stewart successfully claimed the barony of Castle Stewart in the peerage of Ireland as heir male under the creation of 1619; but although he was permitted in 1790 to vote as Lord Ochiltree in an election of Scottish representative peers, his claim to this barony as collateral heir of the grantee of 1615 was disallowed by the House of Lords in 1793.

A branch of the Ochiltree family is introduced at the Swedish House of Lords (Riddarhuset) under the name Stuart. Hans (Johannes) Stuart (d. 1618) obtained a letter of descent in Edinburgh in 1579 and a letter of arms at Holyrood Castle in Edinburgh from King James VI of Scotland in 1585.

== Lords Ochiltree (1542) ==
- Andrew Stewart, 1st Lord Ochiltree (c. 1505–1548)
- Andrew Stewart, 2nd Lord Ochiltree (c. 1521–1591)
- Andrew Stuart, 3rd Lord Ochiltree (c. 1560–1629), resigned lordship in 1615 and created Baron Castle Stewart in 1619.
- James Stewart, 4th Lord Ochiltree (1595–c. 1658) son of James Stewart, Earl of Arran, made Lord Ochiltree in 1615.
- William Stewart, 5th Lord Ochiltree (c. 1659–1675)

== See also ==
- Earl Castle Stewart
- Lord Methven
- Lord Avondale
- Lord Colvill of Ochiltree
- Ochiltree Castle, East Ayrshire
