= List of Franklin & Marshall College alumni =

This is a list of alumni of Franklin & Marshall College in Lancaster, Pennsylvania.

== Arts ==
- Richard Altick, Class of 1936, literary scholar known for his pioneering contributions to Victorian Studies, as well as for championing both the joys and the rigorous methods of literary research
- Franklin Schaffner, Class of 1942, Oscar-winning film director (Patton, Planet of the Apes)
- Glen Tetley, Class of 1946, choreographer
- Ed Flesh, Class of 1953, art director, designed wheel for Wheel of Fortune
- Roy Scheider, Class of 1955, Academy Award-nominated actor (Jaws and All That Jazz)
- Dick Orkin, Class of 1956, radio announcer and commercial producer
- James Lapine, Class of 1971, Pulitzer Prize-winning and Tony Award-winning playwright (Sunday in the Park with George, Into the Woods)
- Bruce Sussman, Class of 1971, songwriter and librettist
- Treat Williams, Class of 1973, actor (Hair, Prince of the City, TV's Everwood)
- Jeffrey Lord, Class of 1973, political analyst, most noted as a CNN surrogate for President Donald Trump
- Richard Plepler, Class of 1981, CEO of HBO
- Dorinda Medley, Class of 1986, cast member on The Real Housewives of New York
- Jennifer Gareis, Class of 1992, actress (TV's The Bold and the Beautiful, The Young and the Restless)
- Spliff Star, Class of 1996, rapper and hypeman for MC Busta Rhymes
- Jason Narvy, Class of 2002, actor (Mighty Morphin Power Rangers)
- Jennifer Stanley, cozy mystery author
- Dominic Akena, Class of 2016, xylophone player, subject of Emmy-winning documentary War/Dance
- Mallika Dua, Indian comic
- Charles Demuth, American painter and watercolorist

== Government and law ==
- John Weinland Killinger, Class of 1843, U.S. congressman from Pennsylvania (1859–1863, 1871–1875, 1877–1881)
- Thomas Bard McFarland (1828–1908), associate justice of the Supreme Court of California
- Daniel Ermentrout (1837-1899), U.S. congressman from Pennsylvania's 8th congressional district (1881–1889), U.S. congressman from Pennsylvania's 9th congressional district (1897-1899), Pennsylvania state senator from the 1st district (1873-1887)
- J. Roland Kinzer, Class of 1896, U.S. congressman from Pennsylvania (1930–1947)
- George Kunkel, Class of 1915, Pennsylvania state senator (1937–1941)
- Guy K. Bard, Class of 1916, judge of the United States District Court for the Eastern District of Pennsylvania
- William I. Troutman, Class of 1927, judge and U.S. congressman from Pennsylvania (1943–1945)
- John P. Saylor, Class of 1929, member of U.S. House of Representatives, environmental advocate
- Eugene Shirk, mayor of Reading, Pennsylvania (1964–1968, 1972–1976)
- Edwin D. Eshleman, Class of 1942, U.S. congressman from Pennsylvania (1967–1977)
- Clarence Newcomer (1923–2005), Class of 1944, judge of the United States District Court for the Eastern District of Pennsylvania
- Ronald Buckwalter, Class of 1958, judge of the United States District Court for the Eastern District of Pennsylvania
- William H. Gray, Class of 1963, U.S. congressman from Pennsylvania (1979–1991); House majority whip (1989–1991); president of United Negro College Fund (1991–2004)
- Robert J. Kafin, Class of 1963, civic leader and environmentalist
- Kenneth Duberstein, Class of 1965, White House chief of staff under Ronald Reagan
- Liam O'Grady, Class of 1973, judge of the United States District Court for the Eastern District of Virginia
- The Hon. D. Brooks Smith, Class of 1973, judge on the United States Court of Appeals for the Third Circuit (2002–present); former judge on the United States District Court for the Western District of Pennsylvania (1988–2002); chief judge (2001–2002)
- Jeffrey M. Lacker, Class of 1977, president of the Federal Reserve Bank, Richmond, Virginia
- Mary Schapiro, Class of 1977, former chair of the U.S. Securities and Exchange Commission
- Patricia Harris, Class of 1977, former first deputy mayor for the City of New York; current CEO of Bloomberg Philanthropies
- Paula Dow, Class of 1977, attorney general of New Jersey (2010–2012)
- Tim Canova, Class of 1982, law professor and former candidate for U.S. House of Representatives in Florida
- Edward George Smith, Class of 1983, judge of the United States District Court for the Eastern District of Pennsylvania
- Ken Mehlman, Class of 1988, campaign manager for George H. W. Bush, former chairman of the United States Republican Party, 2005–2007
- Evelyn Farkas, Class of 1989, former deputy assistant secretary of Defense for Russia/Ukraine/Eurasia
- Barry Finegold, Class of 1993, Massachusetts state senator
- Daniel Ragsdale, former acting director of Immigration & Customs Enforcement
- Rob Teplitz, Pennsylvania state senator
- Lloyd Smucker, congressman from Pennsylvania's 11th district, did not graduate
- Paul Leventhal (1938–2007), Class of 1959, journalist and nuclear nonproliferation expert
- Dan Gaiewski, Class of 2023, Connecticut state representative

== Business ==
- George Frederick Baer, Class of 1861, president of the Philadelphia and Reading Railroad
- Jacob Clark Hennebberger, Class of 1913, co-founder of Weird Tales magazine (1923)
- J. M. Lansinger, Class of 1914, co-founder of Weird Tales and publisher of College Humor
- Wanda Austin, Class of 1975, president and CEO of The Aerospace Corporation
- Neil C. Krauter, commercial insurance industry executive
- Rob Shepardson, Class of 1983, founding partner of advertising agency SS+K
- Susan Wendy Parker, Class of 1987, professor at the School of Public Policy at the University of Maryland

== Science and medicine ==
- Theodore E. Woodward, Class of 1934, Nobel Prize nominee; medical researcher
- David Simons, Class of 1943, NASA physician, established altitude record of 102,000 feet in a helium balloon in 1957, testing equipment that would be used by astronauts
- William Bevan, former president of the American Psychological Association
- Stanley Dudrick, Class of 1957, surgeon, pioneered the use of TPN
- Michael J. Mumma, Class of 1963, NASA, founding director of the Goddard Center for Astrobiology and Senior Scientist, Solar System Exploration Division
- Alan I. Leshner, Class of 1965, director of National Institute of Drug Abuse 1994–2001
- David A. Ansell, Class of 1974, doctor and author
- Clifford Pickover, Class of 1979, author and IBM researcher
- Charles M. Lieber, Class of 1981, chemist, pioneer in nanoscience; in 2021 guilty of federal charges related to Chinese research funding
- Elizabeth Cascio, Class of 1997, economist studying the economic impact of policies affecting education
- Justin B. Ries, Class of 1998, geoscientist and inventor known for discoveries in the field of global oceanic change
- Anne Hultgren, Class of 1999, physicist, Department of Homeland Security

== Athletics ==
- Frank Sprig Gardner, Class of 1930, National Wrestling Hall of Fame (1986); Franklin & Marshall College Athletic Hall of Fame (wrestling, 1992)
- Bowie Kuhn, Class of 1948, commissioner of Baseball (1969–1984)
- Don Wert, attended in 1957, MLB player for 1968 World Series champion Detroit Tigers
- J. Andrew Noel, Class of 1972, wrestling coach and athletic director at Cornell University
- Jeff Rineer, attended 1974–75, former MLB pitcher
- Peter Schaffer, Class of 1984, sports agent; columnist for Washington Post; star of Esquire Network docuseries The Agent
- Michael T. Dee, Class of 1985, CEO, San Diego Padres (2009–2016)
- Matt Steinmetz, Class of 1986, journalist and sportscaster
- Chris Finch, Class of 1992, Current NBA head coach of the Minnesota Timberwolves, and former assistant coach of the New Orleans Pelicans, Houston Rockets, Toronto Raptors, and Denver Nuggets
- Rebecca Meyers, Class of 2021, Paralympic Games swimmer who won three gold medals at the 2016 Summer Paralympics

== Religion ==
- Willam R. Rathvon, CSB, Class of 1873, Christian Science practitioner, lecturer, church director and the only known eyewitness of Lincoln's Gettysburg Address to leave an audio recording of his impressions
- Rev. Earl Honaman, BA, Class of 1925, former Episcopal bishop of Central New York; Army chaplain in World War II during the Battle of the Bulge
- Metropolitan Tikhon (Marc Raymond Mollard), class of 1988
- Richard Druckenbrod, United Church of Christ pastor and Pennsylvania German linguist

== Academia ==
- David Bowman Schneder, Class of 1880, second president of Tohoku Gakuin University (1857–1936)
- William Edwin Hoy, class of 1882, founder of Tohoku Gakuin University; missionary to Japan and China, (1888–1927)
- Andrew Truxal, Class of 1920, president of Hood College and Anne Arundel Community College
- Richard J. Stonesifer Class of 1944, fifth president of Monmouth University (1971–1979)
- James J. Whalen, Class of 1950, president of Ithaca College (1975–1992)
- Richard Kneedler, Class of 1965, President Emeritus of Franklin and Marshall College
- Keith Hamm, Class of 1969, Edwards Professor of Political Science at Rice University
- LeRoy Pernell (1971), former dean of Florida A&M University College of Law & Northern Illinois University College of Law
- Paul R. Brown, Class of 1972, eighth president of Monmouth University
- Louise Burkhart, Class of 1980, ethnohistorian and scholar of Mesoamerican literature; professor of anthropology at University at Albany, SUNY
- Henry Kulp Ober, former president of Elizabethtown College
- Roderic Grupen, Class of 1980, computer scientist, roboticist, professor emeritus of the University of Massachusetts Amherst

== Military ==
- Henry Kyd Douglas (1838–1903), Class of 1858, studied law in Lexington, VA and admitted to bar in Charleston, VA; major in the Confederate States Army (1861–1865), youngest Civil War officer of Stonewall Jackson; later adjutant general of the Maryland Army National Guard; author of published manuscript memoir, I Rode with Stonewall (1940)
- Richard Winters, Class of 1941, WWII officer and veteran of D Day, Operation Market Garden, Carentan and the Battle of the Bulge; main character in Band of Brothers; member of Delta Sigma Phi fraternity
- David R. Smith, Class of 1964, major general, commander of the United States Air Force Reserve Command and commander of the 10th Air Force
- Richard P. Mills, Class of 1972, lieutenant general, USMC deputy commandant for Combat Development and Integration and commanding general, Marine Corps Combat Development Command

== Other ==
- Scott Ritter, former United Nations Weapons inspector and convicted sex offender
