= Hultgreen =

Hultgreen is a surname. Notable people with the surname include:

- Dagny Hultgreen (born 1962), America film actress and entertainment reporter
- Finn Sture Hultgreen (born 1949), Norwegian politician
- Kara Hultgreen (1965–1994), United States naval aviator

== See also ==
- Hultgren
