= Hultgren =

Hultgren is a surname of Swedish origin meaning 'Forest Branch'.

== Geographical distribution ==
As of 2014, 51.3% of all known bearers of the surname Hultgren were residents of Sweden (frequency 1:3,116), 39.1% of the United States (1:150,084), 2.8% of Norway (1:29,725), 2.3% of Australia (1:169,813) and 1.9% of Argentina (1:374,943).

In Sweden, the frequency of the surname was higher than national average (1:3,116) in the following counties:

1. Kalmar County (1:1,079)
2. Östergötland County (1:1,552)
3. Jönköping County (1:1,720)
4. Värmland County (1:1,862)
5. Blekinge County (1:1,974)
6. Gotland County (1:2,017)
7. Kronoberg County (1:2,392)
8. Örebro County (1:2,769)
9. Västra Götaland County (1:2,889)
10. Dalarna County (1:2,977)
11. Västmanland County (1:2,981)

== People ==
- Anne Hultgren, American scientist
- Axel Hultgren, (1886–1974), Metallography Professor, Royal Institute of Technology, Stockholm, Sweden
- Chayne Hultgren, known as the Space Cowboy (Australian Circus and Freak show performer)
- Craig Hultgren, American cellist and improvisor
- David Hultgren, American politician and judge in Illinois
- Edvard Hultgren (1904 –1984), Swedish boxer who competed in the 1924 Summer Olympics
- Gunnar Hultgren (1902 –1991), Swedish bishop, Archbishop of Uppsala
- Gustaf Hultgren (born 1983), Swedish pole vaulter and coach
- Herbert Hultgren (1917–1997), American educator and cardiologist
- Knut Hultgren (1910 – 1985), Norwegian actor
- Kristoffer Hultgren, atmospheric scientist, Stockholm University, Sweden
- Petra Hultgren, Swedish actress and Miss Sweden 1995
- Ralph Hultgren (born 1953), Australian trumpet player and composer
- Ralph Raymond Hultgren (1905–1993), Metallurgy Professor UC Berkeley and Author
- Ralph Hultgren, Australian trumpet player and composer.
- Randy Hultgren, American politician, Illinois Representative
- Scott J. Hultgren, American microbiologist
- Steven Hultgren, Irish Music Producer
