= Grey J. Dimenna =

American academic administrator (1953–2026)

President of Monmouth University
- In office February 28, 2017 – July 31, 2019

Personal details
- Born: Grey J. Dimenna; June 19, 1953
- Died: March 26, 2026 (aged 72) Hunterdon County, New Jersey, U.S.
- Education: Binghamton University; Syracuse University College of Law

Grey J. Dimenna (June 19, 1953 – March 26, 2026) was an American academic administrator who served as the ninth president of Monmouth University in West Long Branch, New Jersey, assuming office on February 28, 2017. He was preceded by Paul R. Brown. Dimenna's initial term of office was extended by the university's governing board in June, 2017 with an announced end date of June 30, 2019. The end of his tenure was extended to July 31, 2019, with the appointment of Patrick F. Leahy as the tenth president of Monmouth University with a term beginning on August 1, 2019.

Prior to his appointment at Monmouth, Dimenna had retired following a 20-year career as the university's vice president and general counsel. As the first to hold the position, he established the organizational framework of the Office of the General Counsel, which has continued to evolve to meet the challenges of increased federal regulations and the myriad legal and compliance issues that face higher education.

As president, Dimenna presided over the university's first commencement ceremony exclusively for graduate students, and a special ceremony for graduating members of the Monmouth University men's lacrosse team who were unable to attend the primary undergraduate ceremony because of scheduling conflicts with the NCAA Division I men's lacrosse tournament. Dimenna made funding for student scholarships a priority during his term in office, and successfully completed a $19.6 million fundraising effort, Together We Can: The Campaign for Student Scholarship.

== Educational philosophy ==
Dimenna stated that his guiding principle as president was to see that the students were prioritized in comprehensive decision making, and that he intended to be visible and accessible to them.

== Early career ==
Before joining Monmouth, Dimenna served from 1991 to 1995 as Assistant Section Chief/Senior Deputy Attorney General for the New Jersey Department of Law and Public Safety where he supervised 25 deputy attorneys general, including attorneys representing the state colleges. He was primary counsel for several of the New Jersey State Colleges and Universities and also represented the Department of Higher Education and the New Jersey Higher Education Assistance Authority.

== Academic background ==
Dimenna graduated from Binghamton University, where he earned a BA degree, and the Syracuse University College of Law with a Juris Doctor.

== Personal life and death ==
His personal hobbies included motorcycle riding and playing guitar. Dimenna played guitar on "After Midnight" a record produced by Monmouth University's student-run record label, Blue Hawk Records.

Dimenna died in a traffic collision in Hunterdon County, New Jersey, on March 26, 2026, at the age of 72.
