= House at 364 Cedar Avenue =

- U.S. National Register of Historic Places
- New Jersey Register of Historic Places
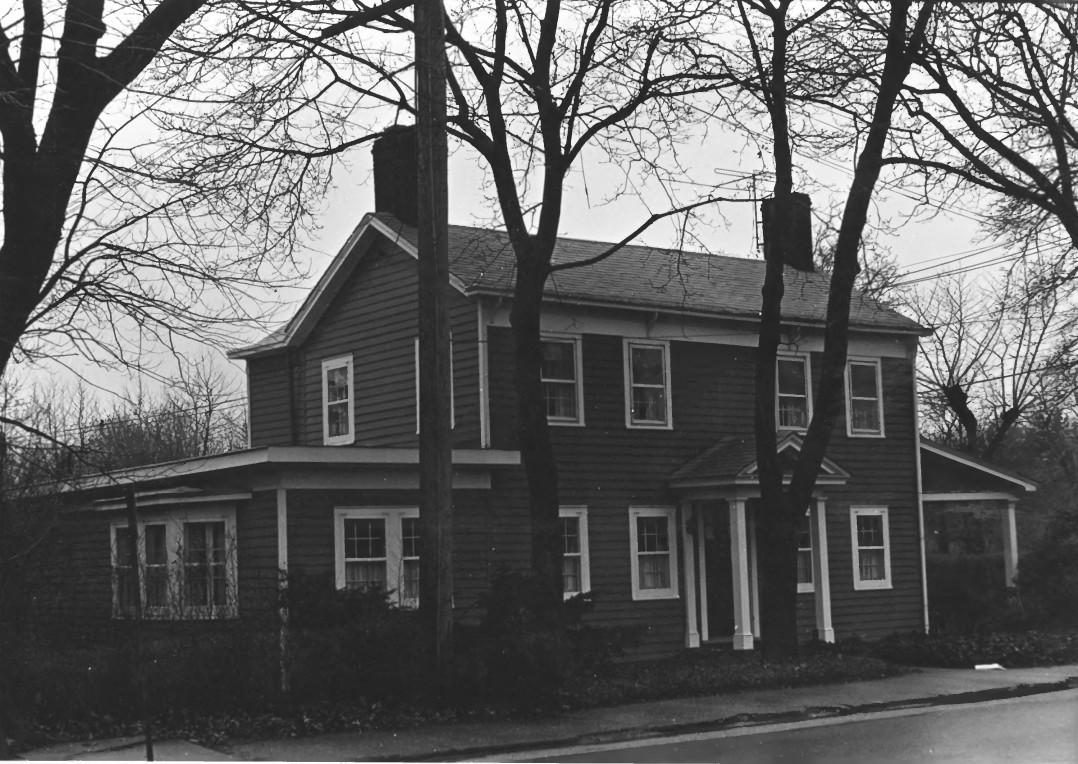
- The house in 1977

- Location within Monmouth County, New Jersey Location within New Jersey Location within the United States
- Location: 364 Cedar Avenue, Long Branch, New Jersey
- Coordinates: 40°16′53″N 74°0′4″W
- Built: c. 1862
- Architectural style: Greek Revival
- NRHP reference No.: 79001514
- NJRHP No.: 2004

Significant dates
- Added to NRHP: November 1, 1979
- Designated NJRHP: July 5, 1979

The House at 364 Cedar Avenue was a historic farmhouse located at 364 Cedar Avenue in the city of Long Branch in Monmouth County, New Jersey, United States. Built around 1862, the Greek Revival house was added to the National Register of Historic Places on November 1, 1979, for its significance in agriculture. The house was demolished around 2009.

== History ==
The house was built on what was once a large farm covering over 100 acres, named the West Farm after John West. On April 4, 1862, Frederick Behr purchased a small plot of this farm and may have built the house around that time. Behr was a German immigrant and raised flowers. After his death in 1902, the property was divided among his daughters. One part later became the carriage house and stables for the Murry Guggenheim House.

== See also ==
- Lauren K. Woods Theatre
- National Register of Historic Places listings in Monmouth County, New Jersey
