= Roderic Grupen =

American computer scientist

- Born: May 10, 1957 (age 69)
- Citizenship: American
- Education: University of Utah
- Occupations: roboticist, academic, researcher
- Employer: University of Massachusetts Amherst

Rod Grupen (born May 10, 1957) is an American roboticist and professor emeritus of Computer science and director of the Laboratory for Perceptual Robotics at the University of Massachusetts Amherst, Amherst. Grupen is a researcher that applies machine learning techniques and insight from theories of infant development to create autonomous robot control systems.

Grupen's research integrates signal processing, control, dynamical systems, learning, and development as a means of constructing intelligent systems. He has published over 100 peer-reviewed journal, conference, and workshop papers. Grupen was the co-editor-in-chief of the Robotics and Autonomous Systems Journal from 2007 to 2016 and serves on the editorial board of the Journal of Artificial Intelligence for Engineering Design, Analysis and Manufacturing (AI EDAM) from 1991 to present. In 2010, Grupen received the Chancellor's Medal, the highest honor bestowed on individuals for exemplary and extraordinary service to the University of Massachusetts.

Grupen received both a B.S. in mechanical engineering from Washington University in St. Louis and a B.A. in physics from Franklin and Marshall College in 1980, an M.S. in mechanical engineering from Pennsylvania State University in 1984, and a Ph.D. in computer science from University of Utah in 1988. Grupen is most recently the author of the book "The Developmental Organization of Robot Behavior" published by MIT Press in 2023.
