= Monmouth University Department of Art and Design =

Monmouth University's Department of Art and Design, located on Monmouth University campus in West Long Branch, New Jersey, offers several undergraduate degrees.

== Degrees ==
- BFA and BA

== Exhibitions ==
The Department of Art and Design is an active participant in the arts of Monmouth. It maintains multiple galleries for exhibiting creative works of students, faculty, and staff, as well as practicing artists and designers. Information on gallery exhibitions and other events and activities associated with art and design can be found on the Arts of Monmouth website.

== Facilities ==
The Department of Art and Design's facilities include multiple Mac computer labs with current software and hardware, drawing studios, painting studios, sculpture studios, darkrooms for photography, printmaking studios including all forms of traditional print including papermaking and BookArts, and much more.

== Achievements of Faculty and Staff ==
The recent achievements of faculty and staff can be found on the Department of Art and Design's Announcements webpage.

Notable achievements of faculty members are documented on their websites, which can be found on the Department of Art and Design's Faculty Members webpage.

== Achievements of Monmouth University Art and Design Students ==
The recent achievements of students can be found on the Department of Art and Design's Announcements webpage as well.

2011

Brielle Wilson - Semi-finalist in the Cereplast Bioplastics competition. Two of the student's designs have made it to the Top 200. The design's were created in the AR 172 Computer Graphics course taught by Professor Edward Johnston. See the student's designs in the reference links. Learn more about the competition in the reference link.

2010

Jillanne Chimento - one of eight finalists in the first Dunkin' Donuts Donut Art competition

Brittany Platt - won the First Place of the Siggraph Annual International SpaceTime Student Exhibition (Poster category). Professor Jing Zhou served as the faculty advisor.

2009

Simone Takacs - won the Third Prize of the Siggraph Annual International SpaceTime Exhibition (Poster category). Professor Jing Zhou served as the faculty advisor.
