= Lenny Stern =

- Education: Brandeis University (BA); University of Pennsylvania (JD)
- Political party: Democratic

Lenny Stern is a founding partner of creative marketing communication agency SS+K, the advertising agency that created the youth campaigns for the Barack Obama presidential campaigns of 2008 and 2012. Stern and his company also developed the yellow LIVESTRONG bracelet and messaging for the Lance Armstrong Foundation.

Stern also led CAA Marketing, a venture of talent and sports agency Creative Artists Agency to incorporate brand marketing into entertainment media for clients. CAA owned a 40% stake in SS+K from 1999 through 2014.

== Background ==
Lenny Stern graduated from Brandeis University in 1983 with a BA in political science. He started his career working for Walter Mondale's presidential campaign (1984), followed by Philadelphia mayor Ed Rendell's gubernatorial campaign (1986), and then Michael Dukakis' presidential bid (1988). Stern earned his JD at the University of Pennsylvania Law School (1989), and after briefly working with Wall Street law firm Paul, Weiss, Rifkind, Wharton & Garrison joined PR firm Sawyer/Miller Group in 1990, where he met Rob Shepardson, Marty Kaminsky, and David McCall. Together, the four would start their own agency in 1993.

== SS+K ==
Founded as Shepardson Stern & Kaminsky, the firm was soon noted for its unique approach to marketing communications, which they described as "an integrated approach – a political way of thinking about communications." Stern clarified the lessons that politics could teach corporate marketers: "With politics you face a diverse set of audiences. There is a set time period, there is a need to focus, unify the message, understand the landscape. In the end, you either win or lose."

SS+K promotional programs typically go beyond simply making ads for their clients. For example, the agency's first client was Time Warner, which with the emergence of Internet technology was planning to expand its cable service into then-groundbreaking areas like video on demand and digital video recording. Stern and his partners felt that there was no way for Time Warner to succeed as a visionary company without first rectifying the strongly negative attitudes consumers held about the poor quality of the cable company's customer service. They proposed an on-time service guarantee – if Time Warner missed a customer appointment, the customer would get a free month of service – and developed advertising meant to disarm consumers' skepticism. Using the tagline "We just might surprise you," the TV ad campaign depicted typically unflappable New Yorkers unfazed by all manner of preposterous circumstances, like real lions on the steps of the New York Public Library, yet being dumbfounded by the suggestion of a cable company honoring its customer service promises. As documented in Victoria Clarke's book Lipstick on a Pig: Winning In the No-Spin Era by Someone Who Knows the Game (2006), the idea not only worked for Time Warner, but service guarantees became a staple of the cable industry.

Over the following years, the agency added a continuous stream of cachet clients, including General Motors, Ralph Lauren, Allstate, Pfizer, Honest Tea and dozens more. The company continues to add top-tier clients to its roster, with JW Marriott, The New Yorker magazine, Starbucks, Wells Fargo, Fresh Direct – and most recently SiriusXM and Comcast – all signing with the agency since 2014.

== CAA Marketing ==
Richard Lovett, president of Creative Artists Agency – a top Hollywood talent agency – has said of Stern: "His strategic thinking is the best I've ever encountered," and in 1999, CAA – at the time an SS+K client – purchased a 40% stake in SS+K. Between 2005 and 2009, Lenny Stern took the reins of CAA's new division, CAA Marketing – though without leaving SS+K – building the west coast operation designed to help companies capitalize on branding opportunities in entertainment media beyond sponsorships and product placements. Stern envisioned the development of strategic entertainment-based content for brands; the organization he built would go on to create the Cannes-award-winning short video Back to the Start for Chipotle in 2012, featuring Willie Nelson. In 2014, SS+K bought out CAA's investment; later that year, M&C Saatchi took a 33% investment in SS+K.

== Notable client work ==
- The Livestrong Bracelet – Stern advised that the Lance Armstrong Foundation position its brand as the 'tough fighter' against cancer – much like the personality of Lance himself. At the time, the Foundation and Nike were introducing a yellow wristband that they wanted to sell as a fundraiser. SS+K suggested branding it with LIVESTRONG, which helped raise tens of millions of dollars through sale of more than 70 million wristbands globally. A documentary video can be viewed on SS+K’s channel on Vimeo.
- Barack Obama Presidential Campaigns – In 2008, the Obama for America campaign hired SS+K to drive the youth vote through an online-fueled registration process and to the polls. SS+K developed the campaign "Don't Get Mad, Get Registered" to channel the frustration and alienation among young voters. On election day 2008, Barack Obama won the highest percentage of the youth vote (68 percent) since exit polling began breaking out voter age in 1976. The Obama campaign, including the paid media team of which SS+K was a member, was named Marketer of the Year by Adweek and won the Cannes Titanium and Integrated Gold Lion advertising awards.

SS+K also created award-winning work for the Obama reelection campaign in 2012, most notably a web video featuring Lena Dunham, slyly discussing voting "your first time" as akin to losing one's virginity. The strength of the youth vote again proved instrumental in swinging the 2012 election for Obama. Documentary videos can be viewed on the SS+K Vimeo channel.

- Honest Tea – Stern's associates from his years teaching a course called Strategic Communication and Business Management at the Yale University School of Management – former student Seth Goldman and co-instructor Barry Nalebuff – formed a natural foods company, Honest Tea. Stern and SS+K developed an awareness campaign aimed at generating large response on a meager budget, placing unmanned kiosks of Honest Tea in the six largest U.S. cities, inviting passers-by to purchase drinks on the honor system. They videotaped the public's response surreptitiously, promoted the event as a "social experiment to identify the most Honest city in America," and published the results in a National Honesty Index. The campaign would win a Gold Cannes Lion in 2011; a documentary video can be viewed on the SS+K Vimeo channel.
- Delta Air Lines – Based on the strong work SS+K had recently produced for Delta Air Lines' Song subsidiary, the airline chose Stern and his company in 2006 to spearhead all advertising and marketing communications following Delta's Chapter 11 bankruptcy filing. A documentary video can be viewed on the SS+K Vimeo channel.
- HBO – In 2014, SS+K was awarded multiple Cannes Lions and also six One Show Pencils – among the highest measures of creative merit in advertising – for its "Awkward Family Viewing" campaign for HBO GO. The spots show families watching TV together, squirming uncomfortably during the broadcast of embarrassing content, such as sex scenes. HBO GO lets people watch HBO shows privately, on their smartphone or tablet devices.

== Personal ==
Lenny Stern has said that his goal is to use creative thinking to make a difference, whether through commercial, political or non-profit work, and SS+K is very active in supporting advocacy programs. The agency currently works with Smile Train (cleft palate repair), and has in the past worked with Bono's {ONE} African relief effort, Share Our Strength/No Hungry Kid, First Lady Michelle Obama's Let's Move! campaign to fight childhood obesity, Sandy Hook Promise (protecting children from gun violence), the Center for American Progress advocacy campaign to fight genocide, and the Bill & Melinda Gates Foundation. Stern has been a long time visiting professor at Yale University School of Management and a visiting lecturer at the Annenberg School for Communication at the University of Pennsylvania, and is on the board of Communities in Schools, the nation's largest and most-effective dropout prevention program. Stern is married with three daughters.
