= Murry Guggenheim House =

- U.S. National Register of Historic Places
- New Jersey Register of Historic Places
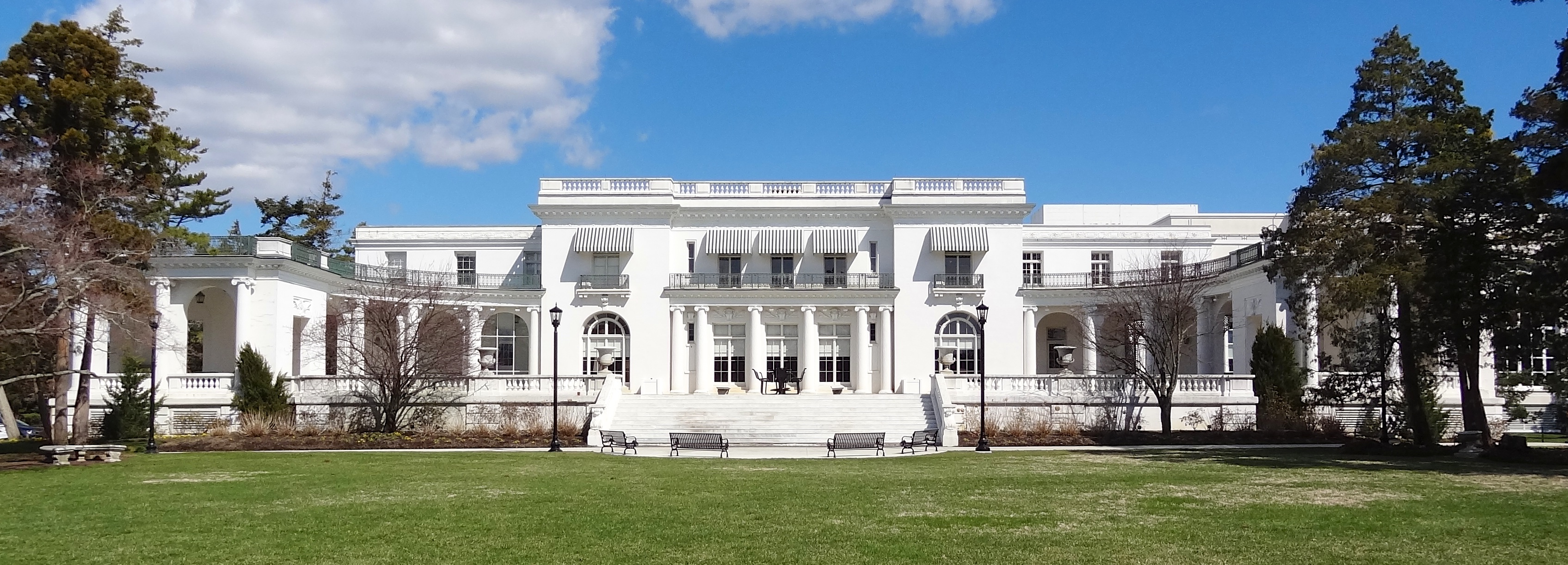
- Guggenheim Library

- Location within Monmouth County, New Jersey Location within New Jersey Location within the United States
- Location: Cedar and Norwood Avenues, West Long Branch, New Jersey, U.S.
- Coordinates: 40°16′56″N 74°0′12″W
- Area: 7 acres (2.8 ha)
- Built: 1903–1905
- Architect: Carrère and Hastings
- Architectural style: Beaux-Arts
- NRHP reference No.: 78001778
- NJRHP No.: 2082

Significant dates
- Added to NRHP: March 28, 1978
- Designated NJRHP: May 26, 1977

The Murry Guggenheim House, also known as the Guggenheim Library, is a historic building located at Cedar and Norwood Avenues in West Long Branch, New Jersey, United States. This Beaux-Arts mansion, designed by Carrère and Hastings in 1903 as a summer residence, is now the Monmouth University library. It was added to the National Register of Historic Places on March 28, 1978, for its significance in architecture.

== History ==
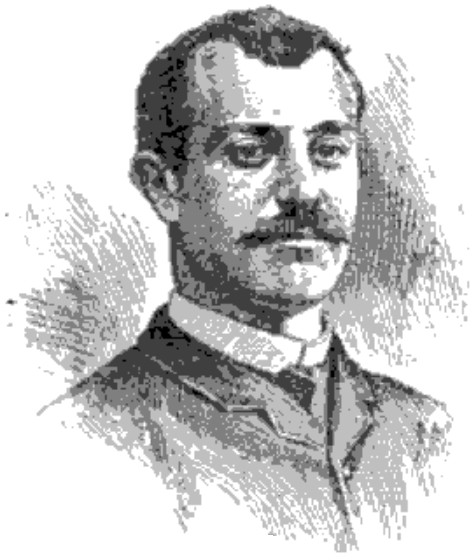
Murry Guggenheim

In 1903, Murry Guggenheim (1858–1939), son of Meyer Guggenheim, bought property in West Long Branch to build a summer residence for himself and his wife, Leonie. The Beaux-Arts architecture firm of Carrère and Hastings was hired to design the building. The firm had achieved prominence with the design for the New York Public Library in 1897. The mansion was started in 1903 and completed in 1905. An addition was built in 1967 on the north side that doubled the available space for the library. In 2003, the library underwent a second expansion, for $14 million, which increased its capacity by 100,000 books.

== Description ==
The building is a two-story Beaux-Arts style mansion with curved side wings and Palladian arcades. The exterior is covered with white stucco. The interior features a grand corridor with Ionic columns. The billiard room is paneled in chestnut, while the living room is finished in walnut. A central corridor with a marble floor provides access to the principal rooms on the first floor.

The design by Carrère and Hastings was honored with a gold medal by the New York Chapter of the American Institute of Architects in 1903. It was styled after the Grand Trianon in Versailles.

== Legacy ==
After the deaths of Murry and Leonie, the property transferred to the Murry and Leonie Guggenheim Foundation in 1959. The Foundation then transferred it to Monmouth College, now Monmouth University, in September 1960. After a year of modifications to convert the building into a college library, it was dedicated as the Murry and Leonie Guggenheim Memorial Library on September 24, 1961.

The estate also included a nearby stable and carriage house at Cedar Avenue, which was donated to the college in 1961. It is now the Lauren K. Woods Theater.

== See also ==
- National Register of Historic Places listings in Monmouth County, New Jersey
