= Patrick F. Leahy =

American academic administrator of Monmouth university

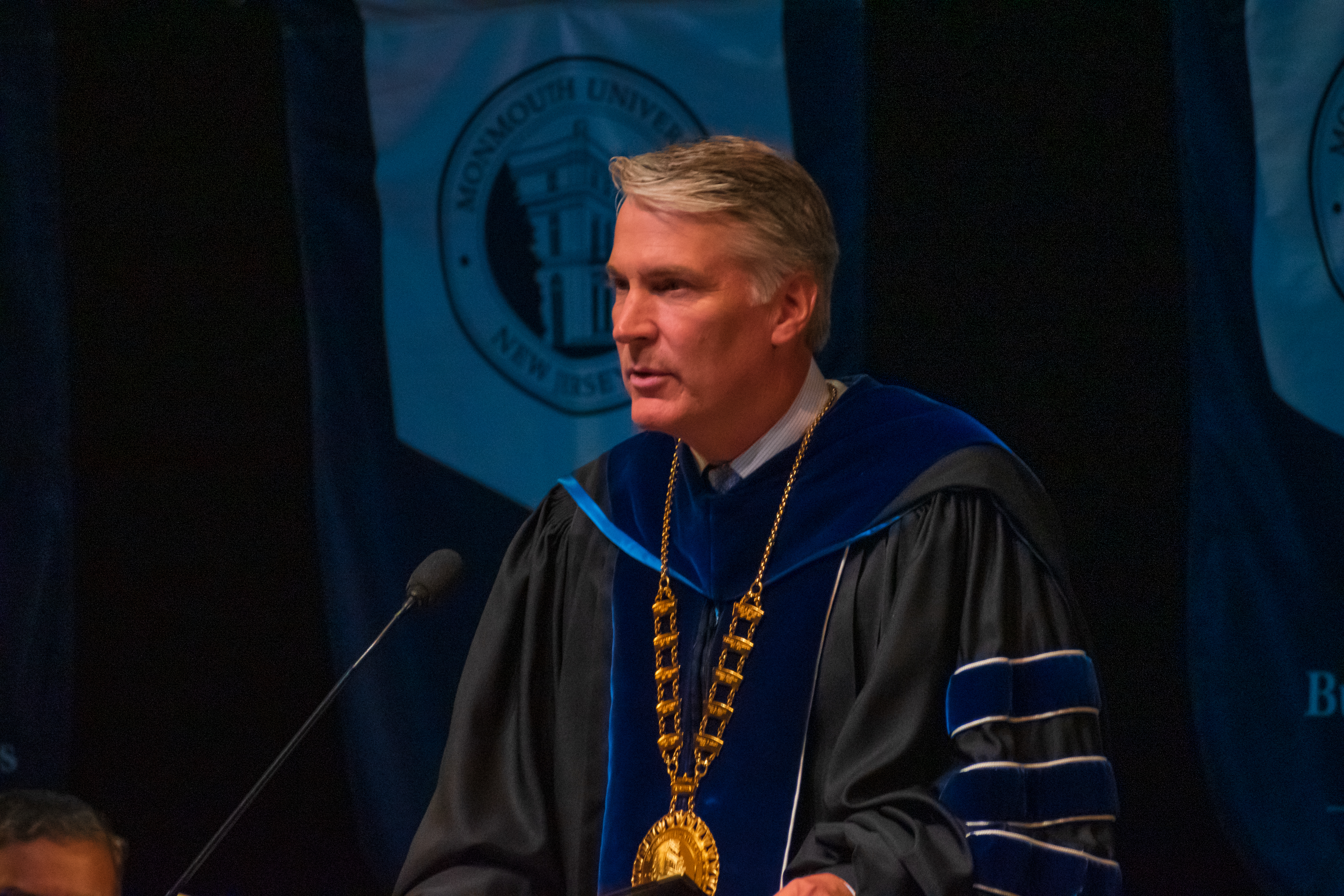

10th President of Monmouth University
- Incumbent
- Assumed office 2019
- Preceded by: Grey J. Dimenna

6th President of Wilkes University
- In office 2012–2019
- Preceded by: Joseph E. Gilmour
- Succeeded by: Alan Gregory Cant

Personal details
- Education: Georgetown University (BA); Cornell University (MBA, MILR); University of Pennsylvania (EdD)
- Profession: Academic administrator

Patrick F. Leahy is an American academic administrator serving as the tenth president of Monmouth University. He previously served as the sixth president of Wilkes University from 2012 to 2019.

== Early life and education ==
Leahy is a native of Towson, Maryland. He earned a Bachelor of Arts degree in English from Georgetown University, dual master's degrees in business administration and labor relations from Cornell University, and a Doctor of Education from the University of Pennsylvania.

== Career ==
From 2004 to 2012, Leahy served as the executive vice president of The University of Scranton in Scranton, Pennsylvania. He later served as president of Wilkes University in Wilkes-Barre, Pennsylvania from 2012 to 2019. Since 2019, Leahy has served as the 10th president of Monmouth University in West Long Branch, New Jersey.
