= Finn Sture Hultgreen =

Norwegian politician (born 1949)

Finn Sture Hultgreen (born 16 October 1949) is a Norwegian politician for the Socialist Left Party.

He served as a deputy representative to the Norwegian Parliament from Nordland during the terms 1993–1997 and 1997–2001. In total he met during 76 days of parliamentary session.
