= Robert J. Kafin =

American lawyer (born 1942)

Robert J. Kafin (born 1942) is an American lawyer whose practice has been concentrated in the area of environmental law. He is a partner at the international law firm of Proskauer Rose LLP. Kafin was the chair of the Times Square Alliance, the Business Improvement District in midtown Manhattan and served on its board of directors and executive committee from 1991 to 2018. He holds a New York City Mayoral appointment as a director of GrowNYC, a non-for-profit organization promoting sustainable urban living and served as its Chair for a 16 year period ending in 2023. In 2015 he was elected chair of the Adirondack Council, an organization protecting the wild character and ecological integrity of the six million acre Adirondack Park., for a term that ended in 2019 and continued to serve on its board of directors until June 2023.

== Education ==
Kafin received his undergraduate degree from Franklin & Marshall College in 1963, where he was awarded the Williamson Medal and announced magna cum laude. He graduated in 1966 from the Harvard Law School, where he was announced magna cum laude.

== Professional history ==
While practicing law in New York City in what was then known as Proskauer Rose Goetz & Mendelsohn, Kafin began a career of environmental activism. In the 1960s, he became the president of Citizens of Clean Air, the founder and chair of the Carl Schurz Park Association, the youngest appointee to New York City Mayor John Lindsay’s Mayor’s Council on the Environment, and a member of Manhattan Community Board 8.

Moving to the foothills of the Adirondack Mountains in 1971 to begin the practice of environmental law in a law firm first known as Kafin & Needleman, Kafin also took on a number of governmental positions, serving as Glens Falls city judge in 1976, as counsel to the New York State Senate from 1972-1987, and as the chairman of the Glens Falls Environmental Conservation Commission. He also was the lawyer for the United States Department of Commerce and the Lake Placid Olympic Organizing Committee in connection with the environmental impact statement and environmental permits for the 1980 Winter Olympic Games in Lake Placid, New York.

In 1987, Kafin returned to New York City to create an Environmental Law Practice Group at Proskauer Rose LLP. The Manhattan Borough president appointed him to the Manhattan Citizens’ Solid Waste Advisory Board, and thereafter NYC Mayor Rudy Giuliani appointed him as a member of the Council on the Environment of New York City, now known as GrowNYC. In 2005, he was reappointed by NYC Mayor Michael Bloomberg who also named him chairman of that organization. On April 25, 2018, NYC Mayor Bill de Blasio reappointed him as Chair of GrowNYC.

From 1992 to 2005 Kafin served as Proskauer's Chief Operating Partner.

== Other civic and environmental organization involvement ==
Kafin has also founded and led numerous other civic and environmental organizations, including Volunteer Lawyers for the Arts, the Environmental Law Section of the New York State Bar Association, Parks & Trails New York, Lower Adirondack Arts Council, and Friends of Coles Woods.

He has also served as a director of: the Adirondack Conservancy Committee (now, Adirondack Chapter of The Nature Conservancy), Adirondack Regional Chamber of Commerce, Broadway Association, Crandall Library, Emma Willard School, Environmental Planning Lobby (now Environmental Advocates), The Hyde Collection, Lake George Association, and the Preservation League of New York State.

On December 16, 2021, NYS Governor Kathy Hochul appointed Kafin to the Adirondack Road Salt Reduction Task Force.

In October 2022 Kafin was elected to the Board of Trustees of Paul Smith's College

== Awards ==
In 2011 Kafin received the George W. Perkins Award as an "Environmental Law Pioneer" from Parks & Trails New York. In 2015 he received the Stewardship Volunteer of the Year Award from the Lake George Land Conservancy. In 2017 he received the Visionary Leadership Award from The Broadway Association.

== Publications ==
Kafin served as an editor of both the New York Environmental Law Handbook and The Treatise on New York Environmental Law.
