= Lauren K. Woods Theatre =

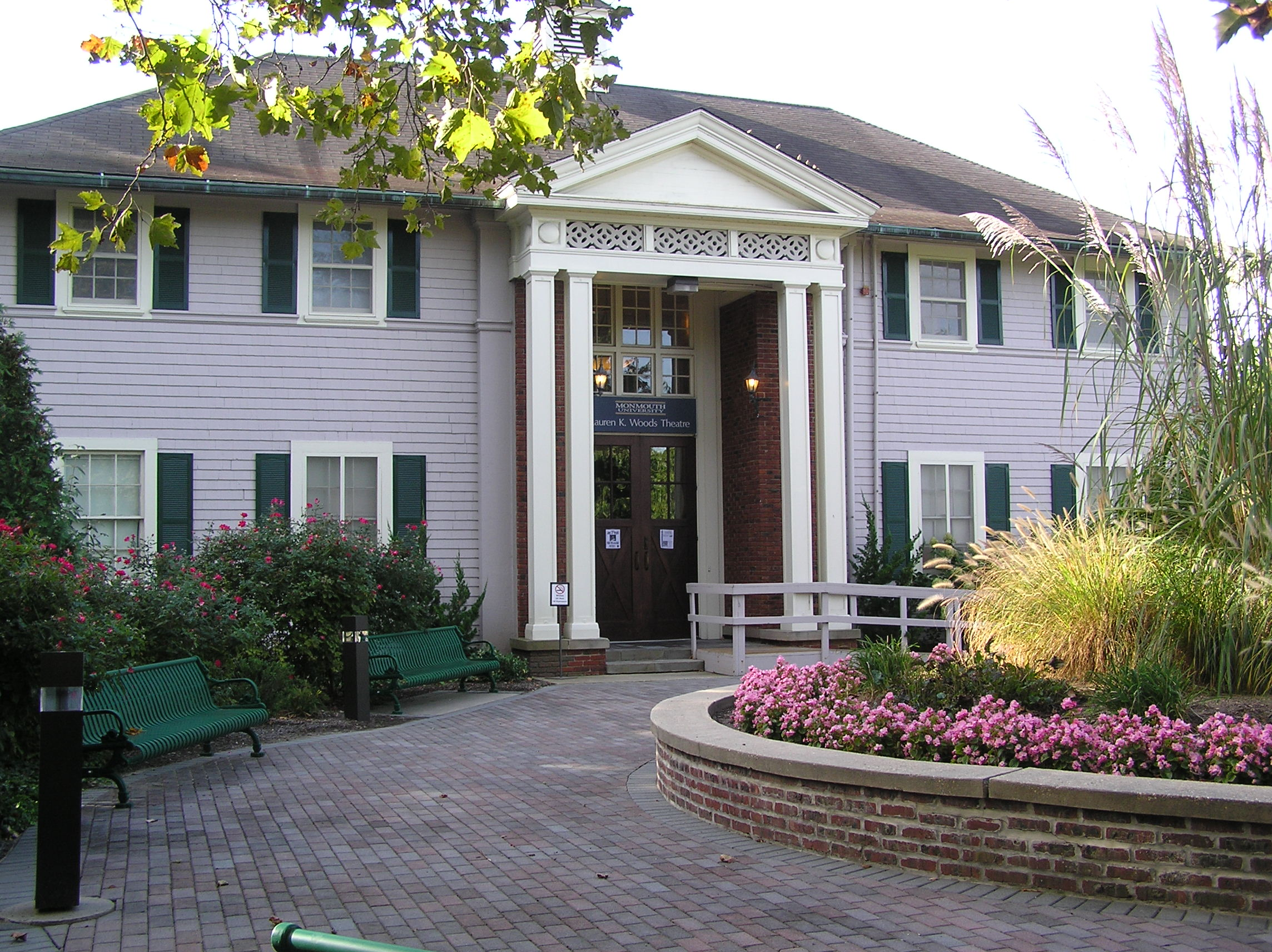

- Location within Monmouth County, New Jersey Location within New Jersey Location within the United States
- Location: 370 Cedar Avenue, Long Branch, New Jersey
- Coordinates: 40°16′52″N 74°0′6″W

The Lauren K. Woods Theatre is located on the campus of Monmouth University, at 370 Cedar Ave, in Long Branch, New Jersey.

== History ==
The Guggenheim foundation donated the carriage house to Monmouth College—later renamed Monmouth University—in 1961. The school first opened the building as the Performing Arts Center in 1967 after a unique hexagonal experimental theater was added to the carriage house by architect Jerome Morley Larson Sr., AIA of Red Bank, NJ who also remodeled the carriage house as a support facility for dance, music, and broadcast as well as theater. The hexagonal theater is capable of configuring from a theater in the round to thrust to proscenium as a teaching aid; a ribbon of windows around the upper lighting balcony allows experimenting with natural light á la Greek amphitheater; the windows feature internal venetian blinds to block 85% of the light. The theater was so successful it was used as inspiration for the Two River Theater in Red Bank.

One detail of architect Larson's design was retaining solid brass horse stalls and converting them to makeup booths large enough to teach the art of makeup; retaining the custom mosaic tile back walls with each horse's name spelled out in tile – topped with a carved plaster coved ceiling. On the wall opposite the stalls architect Larson installed 4x4 oak dressing cabanas – preserving the ambiance of the gilded age that extended even to their horses. The manure pit became the stairwell down to stage level and up to the second floor.

In the front lobby, Larson installed a public stair to the second level, removing several heavy timber joists which he sent for structural testing – they tested twice the strength of select structural grade so no reinforcement for assembly use was needed.

In 1978 the theatre was renamed the Guggenheim Theatre. It was later renamed the Lauren K. Woods Theatre after a Monmouth facility member. The property was remodeled in 2007, destroying the curved brick arches and tile murals architect Larson had created for the theater-goer to transition from gilded age carriage house center hall to modern theater.

== Lauren K. Woods III ==
Lauren K. Woods was an actor and longtime member of the faculty at Monmouth University. Woods directed, produced and acted in Monmouth University's summer shows. Over the course of his career, he directed over 100 productions for the school. Outside of his work for the school, he also appeared in over 250 commercials. Woods died in 1995.

== Theatre ==
Monmouth University uses the building as the home of their Department of Music and Theatre Arts. The building is also used for events and performances. The Theatre has a seating capacity of 200.
