= Ralph Hultgren =

Australian trumpet player and composer (born 1953)

Ralph Hultgren (born 1953) is an Australian trumpet player and composer.

== Personal life ==
Hultgren was born in Box Hill, Victoria, Australia. Later in life, after becoming famous for his compositions, he was moved to Newmarket, Queensland, with his wife Julie and two of his five children.

== Professional career ==
Hultgren began his professional music career as a trumpet player in 1970. He has performed with the Central Band of the Royal Australian Air Force, the Melbourne Symphony Orchestra, the Australian Brass Choir, and has worked as a freelance musician for the theatre, opera, cabaret and recording studios.

From 1979–1990, Hultgren was composer/arranger in residence for the Queensland Department of Education's Instrumental Music Program. During this time he produced 185 works for that department. His works have been performed widely within Australia as well as internationally, including the U.S., Canada, Britain, France, Switzerland, Mexico, Singapore, Germany, Hong Kong, Japan, Norway and New Zealand. Hultgren has been nominated for the prestigious "Sammy and Penguin Awards" for his television soundtracks, and has twice won the coveted "Yamaha Composer of the Year Award" for his symphonic band works. In 1998 he became the recipient of the "Citation of Excellence," the Australian Band and Orchestra Directors' Association's highest honor.

Appointments as a consultant in conducting, composition and music education have taken place in Singapore, Hong Kong, New Zealand, Taiwan, the U.S., and throughout Australia. Hultgren is currently Head of Pre-Tertiary Studies at the Queensland Conservatorium, Griffith University, where he also directs the Wind Symphony program and lectures in conducting and instrumental pedagogy.

In 2008, he composed a three movement piece for the St Peters Lutheran College Symphonic Winds titled "An Exuberant Triptych" which was premiered at St Stephen's Cathedral in Brisbane, Australia. It was then later performed on numerous occasions during the Symphonic Winds tour of Europe.

=== Controversy ===
In December 2013, during a performance of Hultgren's A Queensland Set at the 67th annual Midwest Clinic, a wunderkind and young violist accidentally made a large and obnoxious percussive noise by striking his viola on a nearby cymbal. However, Hultgren did not seem phased, and various critics have lauded the unexpected sound for its artistic placement in the piece.

=== Works ===
1. And Enoch Walked With God
2. Beyond The Frontier
3. Bushdance
4. Celebration of Life
5. Eminence
6. Grand March-The Australian Land
7. Immortal! Invisible!
8. Jessie's Well
9. Many Paths (Millen Kulgun)
10. Moto Perpetuo
11. Pageant
12. Pioneers
13. Whirr, Whirr, Whirr!!!
14. An Exuberant Triptych
15. Masada
16. The Hornets Nest
17. Concert Prelude
18. Festal Intrada
19. White Noise
20. Cyclone
21. Cinque Quattro Alla Macia
22. The Capricornian
23. The Queensland Set
24. An Australian Rhapsody
25. Jones' Joy
