= Perceptual robotics =

Perceptual robotics is an interdisciplinary science linking Robotics and Neuroscience. It investigates biologically motivated robot control strategies, concentrating on perceptual rather than cognitive processes and thereby sides with J. J. Gibson's view against the Poverty of the stimulus theory.

As a working definition, the following quote from Chapter 64 by H. Bülthoff, C. Wallraven and M. Giese from The Springer Handbook of Robotics, edited by Bruno Siciliano and Oussama Khatib, published by Springer in 2007, could be used:

In the following we will apply the term Perceptual Robotics to signify the design of robots based on principles that are derived from human perception on all three levels in the sense of Marr. This includes a realization in terms of specific neural circuits as well as the transfer of more abstract biologically-inspired strategies for the solution of relevant computational problems.

== See also ==
- David Marr (neuroscientist) (including a short description of the three levels of perception)
- PERCRO Perceptual Robotics Laboratory, Scuola Superiore Sant'Anna, Pisa, Italy
