= Susan Wendy Parker =

American economist and academic

Susan W. Parker
- Occupations: Economist and academic

Academic background
- Education: Franklin and Marshall College; Yale University

Academic work
- Institutions: University of Maryland
- Website: https://susanwparker.com/

Susan W. Parker is an economist and academic. She is a professor at University of Maryland School of Public Policy where she also serves as the associate director of the Maryland Population Research Center.

Parker's research focuses on education and health in developing countries and the evaluation of programs and public policies, with an emphasis on conditional cash transfer (CCT) programs and targeting. She has conducted projects on the impact of health insurance, standardized test integrity, and mobile banking in underserved populations.

Parker has held editorial positions, including serving as both an Associate Editor and Co-Editor for the Latin American Economic Review. She contributed as a Guest Editor for the Special Issue on The Mexican Economy in Estudios Economicos and has been serving on the board of directors for World Development as well as the Journal of Behavioral Economics for Policy.

== Education ==
Parker completed her undergraduate education, earning a B.A. in Economics and Mathematics from Franklin and Marshall College in 1987. She continued her education by obtaining an M.A. and M.Phil. in Economics in 1990 and attained her Ph.D. from Yale University in 1993. She was also the Rockefeller Postdoctoral Fellow at El Colegio de México from 1993 to 1995.

== Career ==
Parker's academic career started in 2000 as an assistant professor at the Center for Teaching and Research in Economics (CIDE) where she served her appointment as an associate professor from 2003 to 2009 and held the position of Professor until 2018. In 2011, she became a Research Affiliate at the Population Research Center at the University of Pennsylvania and served as a Faculty Associate at the Maryland Population Research Center in 2017. She has been serving as an Affiliate Faculty member at the Latin American Studies Center and holds the appointment of Professor at the School of Public Policy in University of Maryland. She was appointed Honorary Professor in the Department of Economics at the Pontificia Universidad Católica del Perú in 2023.

Parker has been serving as an associate director for the Maryland Population Research Center since 2021.

From 1995 to 2000, Parker served as an Advisor to the Director of Finance at Instituto Mexicano del Seguro Social and held the position of Chief Economic Advisor to the Director at Progresa: Programa de Educacion, Salud, y Nutricion. She briefly worked as a Research Associate at the International Food Policy Research Institute

== Research ==
Parker's research spans a wide range of subjects, including behavioral and community health, education, policy and management, and international affairs.

=== Evaluation of conditional cash transfer programs ===
A main area of Parker's research has been the evaluation of outcomes of the Mexican CCT program. She has studied the development, evaluation, and outcomes of the same program and highlighted how this research has contributed to the implementation of CCT initiatives in over sixty countries. Her investigation of the educational outcomes of the Progresa program focused on the impacts of educational scholarships and health components on children. The research also demonstrated how early nutritional interventions improved educational performance and increased the number of completed grades in schooling. She alongside Jere R. Behrman and Petra E. Todd assessed the medium-term impact of Progresa and employed both experimental as well as non-experimental methods to evaluate the program's effects on education and employment. The findings revealed positive outcomes, including reduced work among younger individuals, increased employment among older girls, and transitions from agricultural to nonagricultural jobs.

In 2023, Parker examined the medium-term effects of Progresa on demographic outcomes by analyzing nationwide administrative data indicating a significant decline in teenage fertility and highlighting the program's influence on family planning outcomes. She along with Tom Vogl investigated the long-term effects of childhood exposure to Progresa and found lasting impacts on women's outcomes in early adulthood, including educational attainment, geographic mobility, labor market performance, and household living standards.

=== Social programs and policy participation ===
Parker has explored the nuances of human behavior in various contexts, shedding light on issues surrounding poverty alleviation, and social program participation. In collaborative research on misreporting in a poverty alleviation program, she alongside César Martinelli revealed that underreporting is common for items associated with desirability and social status. The study also calculated the costs of lying and embarrassment for different goods, showing that the embarrassment cost of not owning an item corresponds to its ownership rate among households. In her research on social program participation, she proposed a model of the participation process, highlighting that decisions at each stage are influenced by expectations about subsequent stages and that knowledge about the program significantly impacts participation outcomes. In another study, she investigated student cheating and cash incentives using data from a policy intervention, employing methods to quantify the extent of cheating.

=== Health spending and education determinants ===
Parker has conducted various studies on health spending and performance incentives dynamics in education. In her research on household health spending in Mexico, she worked together with Rebeca Wong and discovered that lower-income, uninsured households are highly responsive to income changes, resulting in reduced healthcare expenses during economic challenges. She investigated Mexico's Seguro Popular health insurance program using Mexican Health and Aging Study data and revealed significant improvements in healthcare utilization as well as diagnostic tests. Her findings suggested that enhanced healthcare access in underserved areas can amplify the effects of health insurance. With Carla Pederzini, she presented empirical models to explore the determinants of education in Mexico and delved into the factors impacting the educational outcomes in context of gender differences. In 2015, she collaborated with Jere R. Behrman, Petra E. Todd, and Kenneth I. Wolpin to conduct experiments with three performance incentive programs in Mexican high schools and revealed how offering incentives to students, teachers, and administrators has significant impact in enhancing academic performance.

== Awards and honors ==
- 2006 – Banamex National Prize (Second Place) in Economic Research, Banamex
- 2014 – Víctor Urquidi Economics First Prize, El Colegio de México
- 2023 – Profesora Honoraria, Pontificia Universidad Católica del Perú

== Selected articles ==
- Skoufias, E., Parker, S. W., Behrman, J. R., & Pessino, C. (2001). Conditional cash transfers and their impact on child work and schooling: Evidence from the progresa program in Mexico [with comments]. Economia, 2(1), 45–96.
- Parker, S. W., & Skoufias*, E. (2004). The added worker effect over the business cycle: evidence from urban Mexico. Applied Economics Letters, 11(10), 625–630.
- Martinelli, C., & Parker, S. W. (2009). Deception and misreporting in a social program. Journal of the European Economic Association, 7(4), 886–908.
- Behrman, J. R., Parker, S. W., & Todd, P. E. (2011). Do conditional cash transfers for schooling generate lasting benefits? A five-year followup of PROGRESA/Opportunidades. Journal of Human Resources, 46(1), 93–122.
- Parker, S. W., & Todd, P. E. (2017). Conditional cash transfers: The case of Progresa/Opportunidades. Journal of Economic Literature, 55(3), 866–915.
- Martinelli, C., Parker, S. W., Pérez-Gea, A. C., & Rodrigo, R. (2018). Cheating and incentives: Learning from a policy experiment. American Economic Journal: Economic Policy, 10(1), 298–325.
- Parker, S. W., & Vogl, T. (2023). Do conditional cash transfers improve economic outcomes in the next generation? Evidence from Mexico. The Economic Journal, 133(655), 2775–2806.
