= Paul R. Brown =

President of Monmouth University

Eighth President of Monmouth University
- In office August 2013 – February 2017

Personal details
- Born: Paul Richard Brown
- Education: Franklin & Marshall College; University of Texas at Austin

Paul R. Brown was the eighth president of Monmouth University in West Long Branch, New Jersey, assuming office on August 1, 2013, and formally inaugurated on April 10, 2014. He was preceded as Monmouth University president by Paul G. Gaffney II. Prior to his appointment at Monmouth, Dr. Brown served as dean of the College of Business and Economics at Lehigh University from 2007 to 2013.

As president of Monmouth University, Brown led and implemented a comprehensive strategic planning process to establish the university's long-term trajectory, implemented substantial campus improvements to both the physical campus, including construction of a new science facility, the largest investment in academic facilities in university history and academic programs, including the establishment of the Institute for Health & Wellness, and an affiliation with The Grammy Museum, establishing the Bruce Springsteen Archives and Center for American Music, while leading the university to record levels of student enrollment and its highest levels outside financial support, including a $5 million Marine Science & Policy Challenge Grant for the university's Urban Coast Institute. He also championed the role of amateur athletic programs, stressing the importance of providing a meaningful education to student-athletes.

In April 2015, Brown was appointed to the board of trustees of the Monmouth Conservation Foundation, a non-profit organization that has collaboratively preserved more than 22,500 acres of open space and natural habitat throughout Monmouth County with partnerships between public and private entities since its founding in 1977.

In February 2017, it was announced that Brown would begin a sabbatical that concluded with his retirement from the university. Former Vice President and General Counsel, Grey J. Dimenna, was named as Brown's successor.

More recently, The Franklin & Marshall College Board of Trustees elected Brown to a five-year term as a trustee of the college beginning July 1, 2021.

== Early career ==
Under Brown's leadership at Lehigh University, the College of Business and Economics completed a transformative and wide-sweeping strategic plan. During his tenure BusinessWeek ranked Lehigh's College of Business and Economics 31st in the nation among undergraduate business programs, and ranked Lehigh's part-time MBA 15th in the nation and third in the region in 2011. Entrepreneur Magazine and The Princeton Review named Lehigh the 24th best undergraduate college for entrepreneurship in 2012.

Brown managed historically high levels of enrollment in both undergraduate and graduate programs and implemented major changes that focused on undergraduate and graduate program leadership as well as leadership of the College's nationally recognized centers, raising over $40 million in unrestricted funds and for endowed faculty chairs.

Prior to joining Lehigh, Brown spent over 20 years at New York University’s Stern School of Business where he held a variety of senior academic and administrative positions at both the school and university level. He served as the associate dean of executive MBA Programs and academic director of TRIUM, NYU Stern's global executive MBA program in alliance with the London School of Economics and Political Science (LSE) and HEC School of Management, Paris. He also served as chair of the Department of Accounting, Taxation and Business Law at NYU Stern and during his chairmanship led many curriculum and programmatic strategic initiatives and reviews at both the Department and School level.

Brown also served on the faculties at Yale University’s School of Management, the European Institute of Business Administration (INSEAD), and the International University of Japan, as well as guest lectured at universities in China, Singapore, and Brazil.

His research interests in financial reporting and analysis include financial statement analysis and firm valuation, FASB/SEC regulatory policy analysis, international reporting and analysis, and earnings measurement and management.

== Academic background ==
Brown graduated Phi Beta Kappa from Franklin & Marshall College where he received his Bachelor of Arts Degree, and he received both his Doctor of Philosophy and his Masters of Professional Accountancy degrees from the University of Texas at Austin. On June 7, 2014 the Franklin & Marshall Alumni Association honored Brown with an Alumni Citation Award, inducting him as a member of the college's Society of Distinguished Alumni.

== Books ==
Brown is a professor of accounting with an emphasis on financial analysis and governance. He co-authored Financial Reporting, Financial Statement Analysis, and Valuation: A Strategic Perspective (through the sixth edition), a widely used textbook in undergraduate, MBA and executive education programs. In addition, he is the author of the eBook, Foundations of Financial Statement Analysis, which is used in both traditional teaching and mixed-mode distance-learning settings.

== Sources ==
- "Lehigh names dean for business college"
- "Monmouth U. nods to past, looks to future"
- "Paul R. Brown, Department of Accounting: Professor"
