= Monmouth University =

Private university in West Long Branch, New Jersey, US

- Former names: Monmouth Junior College (1933–1956); Monmouth College (1956–1995)
- Type: Private university
- Established: 1933; 93 years ago
- Academic affiliations: CIC; NAICU; Sea-grant
- Endowment: $153.1 million (2023)
- President: Patrick F. Leahy
- Provost: Richard F. Veit
- Administrative staff: 590
- Students: 6,167
- Undergraduates: 4,630
- Postgraduates: 1,537
- Location: West Long Branch, New Jersey, U.S. 40.280°N 74.006°W
- Campus: Suburban, 159 acres (64 ha)
- Colors: Midnight blue, white
- Nickname: Hawks
- Sporting affiliations: NCAA Division I – CAA; CAA Football; ICSA – MAISA
- Mascot: Shadow The Hawk
- Website: monmouth.edu

Monmouth University is a private university in West Long Branch, New Jersey, United States. Founded in 1933 as Monmouth Junior College, it became Monmouth College in 1956 and Monmouth University in 1995 after receiving its charter. It enrolls about 4,660 undergraduate and 1,750 graduate students and employs 302 full-time faculty members.

== History ==
=== Early years ===
The school that would become Monmouth University was founded in 1933 as Monmouth Junior College, a two-year junior college under Dean Edward G. Schlaefer. Created in New Jersey during the Great Depression, Monmouth Junior College was intended by Schlaefer to provide an opportunity for higher education to high school graduates in Monmouth County who could not afford to go away to college. The junior college did not have its own campus at the time of its founding and was housed at Long Branch High School in Long Branch. Due to sharing a building with a high school, classes were taught during evening hours after the high school students had departed.

Monmouth Junior College opened to students on November 21, 1933. The junior college's first student enrollment was reported at 325, all graduates from Monmouth County high schools, with a faculty of 12 instructors. Federal reemployment funds financed the junior college, with approximately $18,000 approved by New Jersey Director of Emergency Relief John Colt.

In 1947, the school received full college accreditation from the New Jersey Board of Education to award associate degrees to students. 100 students became the first recipients of associate degrees from Monmouth Junior College the following year. Support from students and the community is credited with helping the school continue to teach classes and become a privately funded institution.

=== New location and four-year status ===
Monmouth Junior College acquired its own campus in 1955 when it relocated from Long Branch to the estate of Shadow Lawn in West Long Branch. The estate was purchased for $350,000 (equivalent to $4.2 million in 2025). In addition to the monetary cost, the agreement provided that Eugene Lehman, president of the junior college that occupied the estate, would serve as Monmouth's president for one year.

A year later, the school was renamed Monmouth College when it was accredited by the state to offer four-year programs that would award bachelor degrees to students. Through the agreement that granted Shadow Lawn to the school, Lehman became the first president of Monmouth College from 1956 to 1957. Schlaefer resumed leadership after Lehman's tenure, serving as president from 1957 to 1962. Monmouth's first commencement was held at Shadow Lawn the same year that Schlaefer assumed the presidency and the first bachelor's degrees were awarded the year after, in 1958.

The 1960s saw further growth for Monmouth in campus size, athletics, student life, and academics. At the start of the decade, the Murry and Leonie Foundation transferred ownership of the Murry Guggenheim House to Monmouth, which became the school's library. The transfer also included a stable and carriage house that would be converted into the Lauren K. Woods Theatre. Elmwood and Pinewood, Monmouth's first campus residence halls, opened in 1963, while the William T. Boylan Gymnasium was built in 1965 as a new home for the basketball team. Additional property was acquired by the college in 1969 when Monmouth was granted ownership of Maurice Pollak's home, the site of what would become Pollak Theatre. Amid the campus expansion, Monmouth College received authorization from the state to offer graduate programs and award master degrees in 1967.

Monmouth's 50th anniversary in 1983 was coincided by its athletics program being granted Division I status from the National Collegiate Athletic Association (NCAA). Teams representing Monmouth competed in the Northeast Conference for the next three decades. The 50th anniversary also saw the first Founders' Day at Monmouth, which would become an annual tradition. Four years later, the school's Athletics Hall of Fame was established. The school's athletic program was joined by a football team in 1993.

=== University charter ===
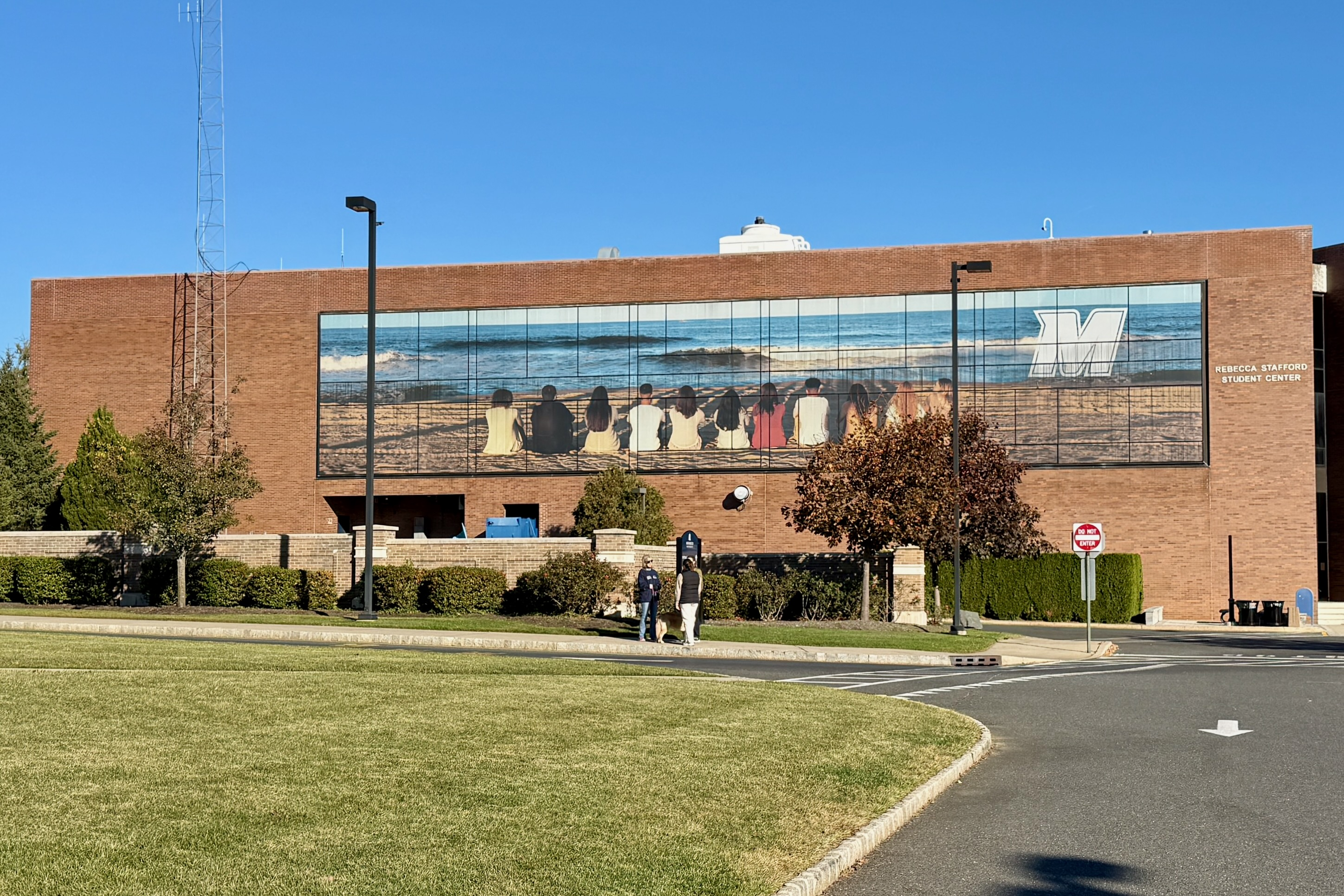
Rebecca Stafford Student Center

A significant development occurred for Monmouth in 1995 when it was granted university status by the New Jersey Commission on Higher Education, resulting in the school being renamed Monmouth University. The university status was obtained under the leadership of Rebecca Stafford, the school's first female president, who described Monmouth as being "on the move". The College Center, constructed in the 1970s, would be renamed the Rebecca Stafford Student Center in her honor.

The 21st century saw the completion of a pedestrian underpass on campus in 2001. By the end of the decade, the Multipurpose Activity Center replaced the William T. Boylan Gymnasium as the home of the men's and women's basketball teams in 2009. The new facility, which cost $57 million, was described by then-Senior Associate Athletic Director Jeff Stapleton as "probably the biggest undertaking that the institution has done". The facility was renamed OceanFirst Bank Center in 2016 after Monmouth University and OceanFirst Bank reached a $4 million agreement through 2036 that included the naming rights of the facility.

The athletic teams would continue to compete in the Northeast Conference until 2013 when they moved to the Metro Atlantic Athletic Conference (MAAC). As the MAAC did not sponsor collegiate football, Monmouth's football team became part of the Big South Conference as an associate member. All teams except for women's bowling joined the Colonial Athletic Association (CAA) in 2022.

In 2025, Monmouth was classified as a research college and university in the Carnegie Classification of Institutions of Higher Education.

== Campus ==
=== Great Hall at Shadow Lawn ===
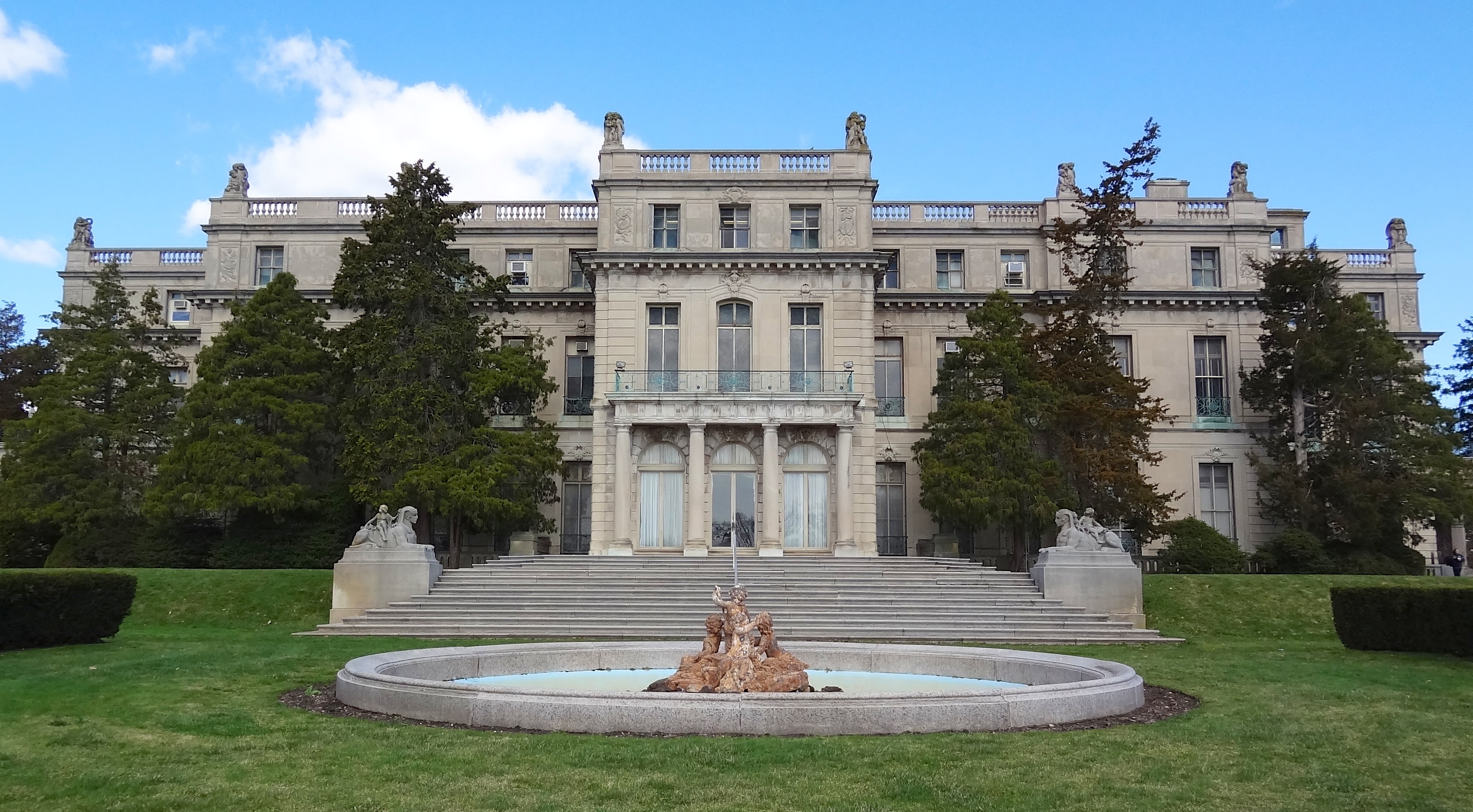
Shadow Lawn

The centerpiece of the Monmouth University campus is Shadow Lawn. Originally, it was the site of the Shadow Lawn mansion, constructed in 1903 and housed 52 rooms.

After the original Shadow Lawn was destroyed by a fire in 1927, the current structure was built as a residence for Mr. and Mrs. Hubert Templeton Parson. Mr. Parson was the former head of F. W. Woolworth Company. The building was designed by Horace Trumbauer and Julian Abele. Abele is regarded as the first professional African American architect.

Shadow Lawn became municipal property during the Great Depression and until Monmouth acquired ownership, it was home to Highland Manor Junior College, a private girls' school. Some classrooms and the administrative offices are inside the building. Shadow Lawn was named to the National Register of Historic Places on March 28, 1978. It was named a National Historic Landmark on February 4, 1985.

Shadow Lawn has also been a host of the film version of Annie, starring Aileen Quinn. Some of the scenes in this movie were filmed inside and outside of the building along with the rest of the Monmouth University campus. Shadow Lawn was used as Daddy Warbucks' mansion.

Following Monmouth's acquisition of the estate, Shadow Lawn was renamed Woodrow Wilson Hall after United States President Woodrow Wilson, who stayed in the original mansion during his campaign in summer of 1916. The current mansion was renamed to Great Hall in 2020, with the university citing racist policies of Wilson for the change.

=== Murry and Leonie Guggenheim Memorial Library ===
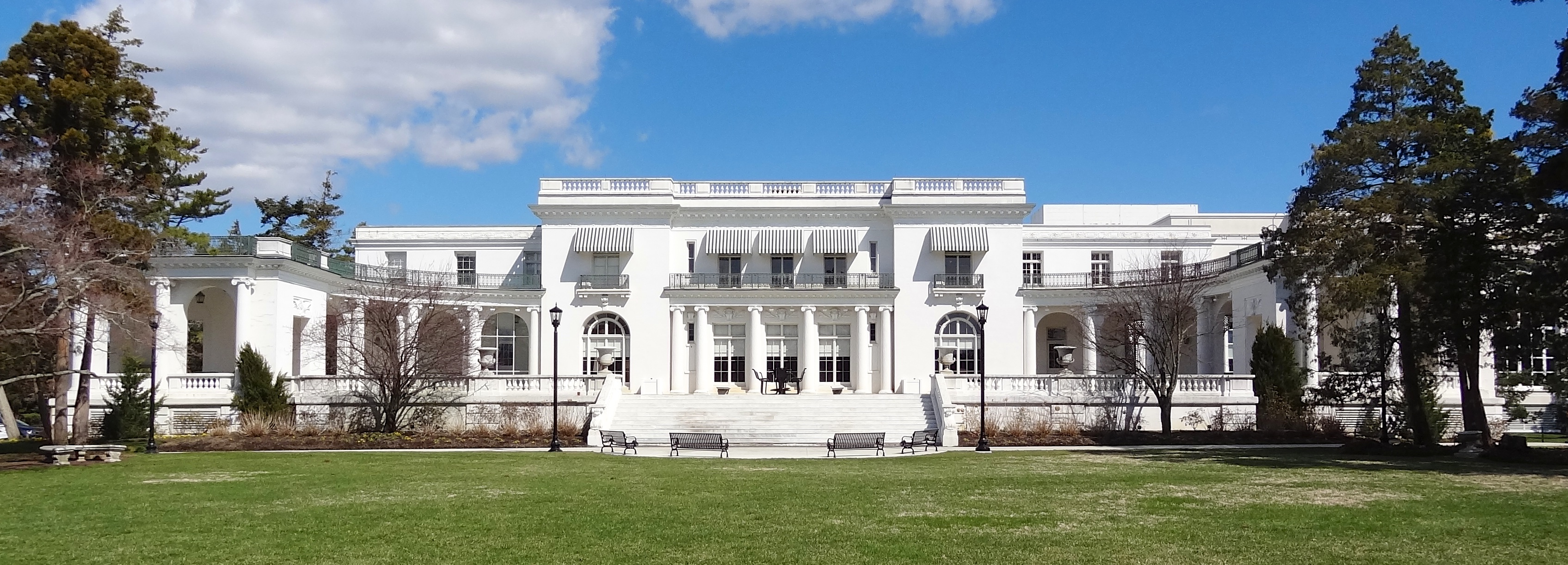
Guggenheim Library

In 1903, Murry Guggenheim (1858–1939), son of Meyer Guggenheim, bought property in West Long Branch to build a summer residence for himself and his wife, Leonie. The original structure of the Beaux-Arts mansion, designed by Carrère and Hastings is now the Murry and Leonie Guggenheim wing of the Monmouth University Library. It was also added to the National Register of Historic Places on March 28, 1978.

=== Lauren K. Woods Theater ===
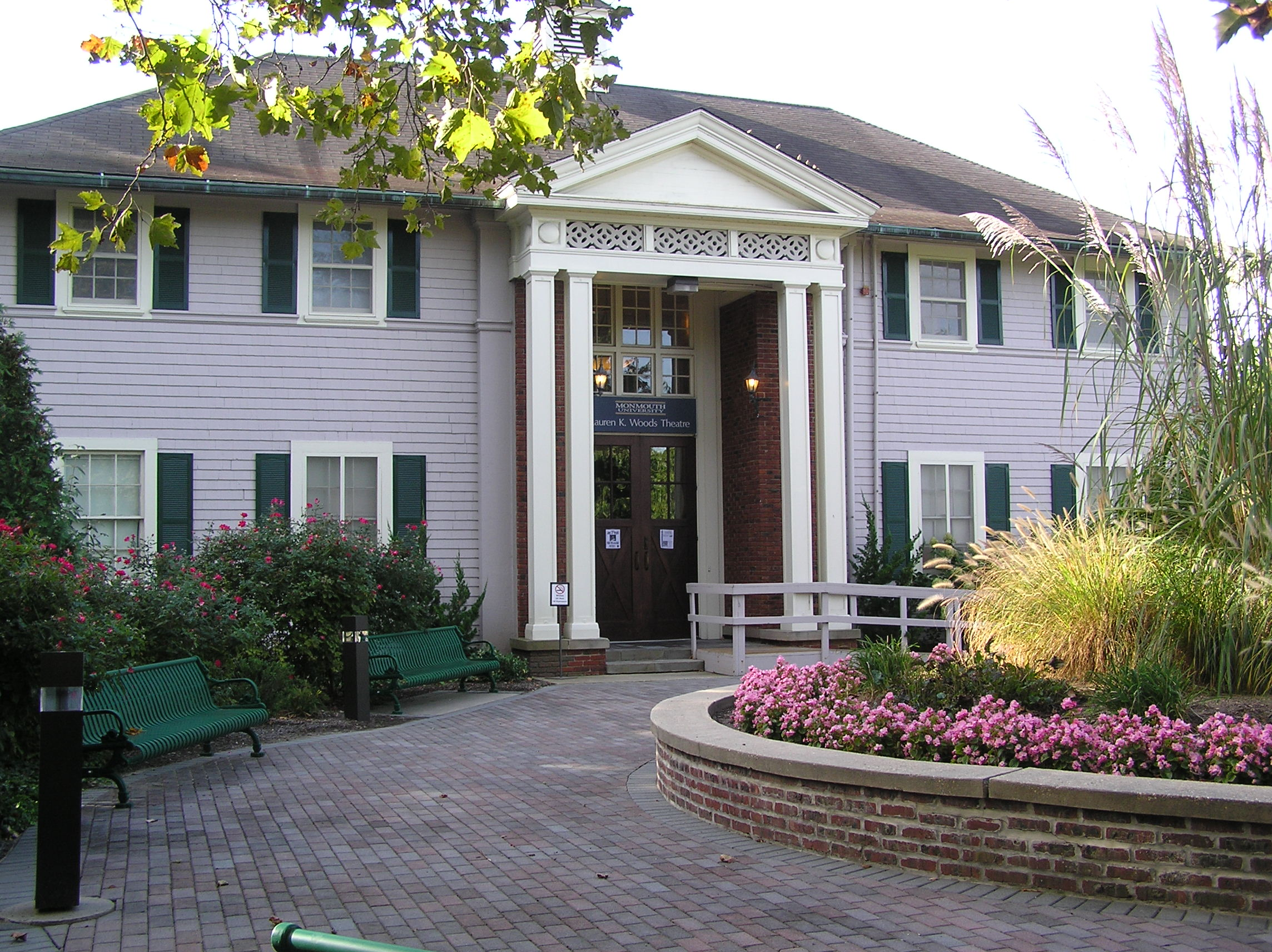
Lauren K. Woods Theatre

The Guggenheim estate also included a stable and carriage house across the road on Cedar Avenue. This has been converted into the Lauren K. Woods Theatre.

=== Springsteen archives ===
Constructed at a cost of $50 million on the university campus in West Long Branch, the 32,000-square-foot (3,000 m^{2}) Bruce Springsteen Center for American Music opened to the public on June 13, 2026. The center includes items from the artist himself, as part of "a comprehensive collection of artifacts and materials pertaining to American music".

== Organization ==
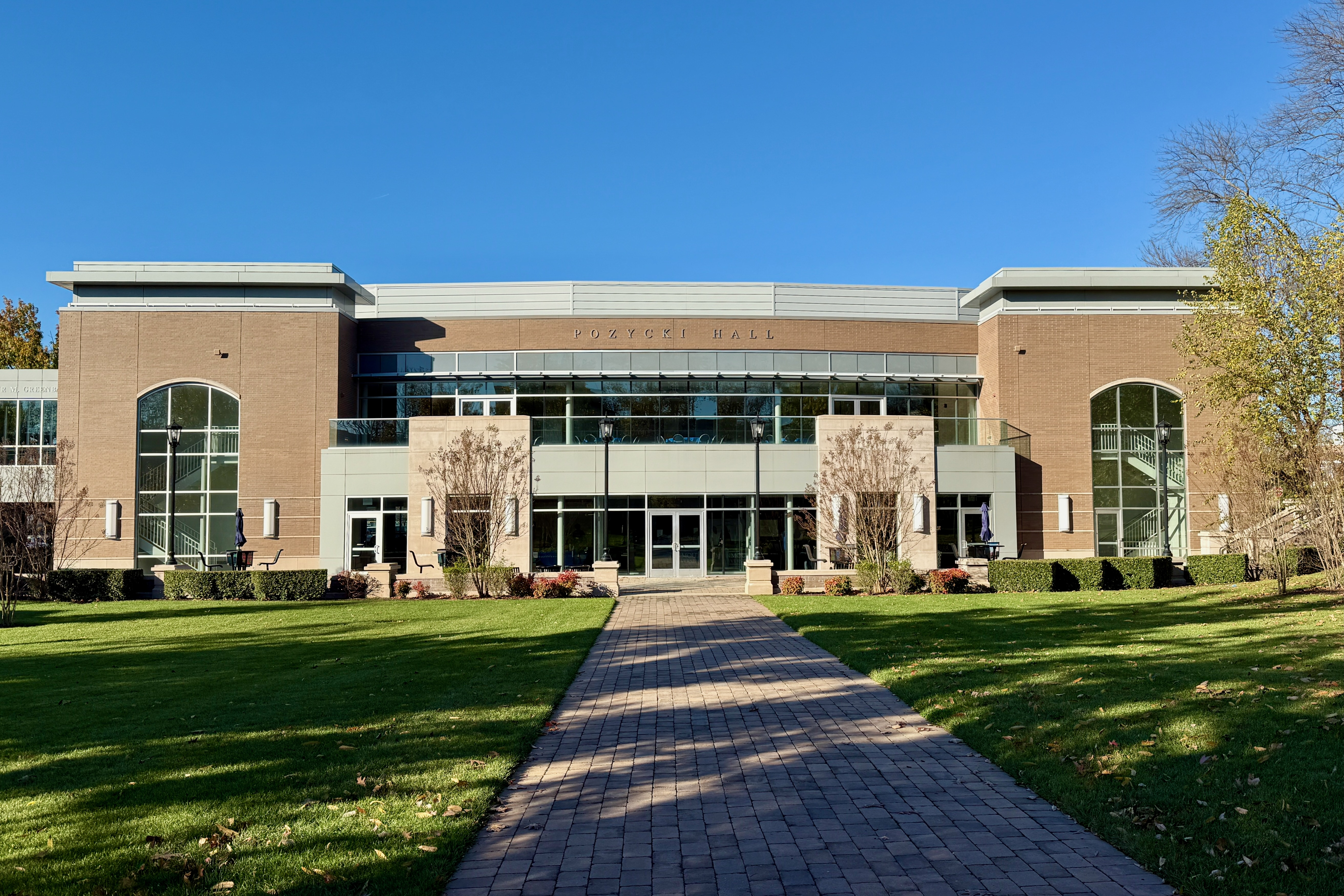
Pozycki Hall, Leon Hess Business School

Monmouth University is organized into seven schools:

- Wayne D. McMurray School of Humanities and Social Sciences
- School of Education
- Leon Hess Business School
- School of Social Work
- School of Science
- Marjorie K. Unterberg School of Nursing and Health Studies
- The Honors School

=== Centers ===
- Bruce Springsteen Center for American Music
- Center for the Arts
- Monmouth University Polling Institute
- Kislak Real Estate Institute
- Institute for Global Understanding
- Center for Entrepreneurship
- Urban Coast Institute

=== Presidents ===
- 1933 to 1956: Edward G. Schlaefer (Dean)
- 1956 to 1957: Eugene H. Lehman
- 1957 to 1962: Edward G. Schlaefer
- 1962 to 1971: William G. Van Note
- 1971 to 1979: Richard J. Stonesifer
- 1980 to 1993: Samuel Hays Magill
- 1993 to 2003: Rebecca Stafford
- 2003 to 2013: Paul G. Gaffney II
- 2013 to 2017: Paul R. Brown
- 2017 to 2019: Grey J. Dimenna
- 2019 to present: Patrick F. Leahy

== Academics ==
=== Undergraduate admissions ===
In 2023, the university accepted 90.9% of applicants, with those admitted having an average 3.57 GPA and those submitting test scores having an average 1110–1300 SAT score or average 22–30 ACT score.

=== Rankings ===
Academic rankings

Regional
- U.S. News & World Report: 15

National
- Forbes: 427

Monmouth University's placement on the U.S. News & World Report Best Colleges Ranking increased during the 2010s, moving from 76 in 2005 to 37 in 2012 and 30 in 2013 among regional universities in the Northern United States. By 2018, Monmouth ranked at 28 among northern regional universities, its highest spot at the time from U.S. News & World Report. The ranking also made Monmouth the highest private regional university in New Jersey and the state's second-highest regional university behind The College of New Jersey.

Despite moving up in the U.S. News & World Report ranking, however, Monmouth University did not appear on Forbes's List of America's Best Colleges until 2021. Mark Blackmon, the director of News and Public Affairs at Monmouth, attributed the school's omission in 2016 to Forbes relying "on some information that can be highly subjective", with schools "[losing] points for awarding grants and scholarships". In response to Forbes allegedly lowering a school's ranking for providing financial support, Blackmon commented that, "We are actually quite proud that we can assist so many students in getting an education", and concluded, "Even though Monmouth failed to make the Forbes list, I think that it doesn't reflect the quality of its teachers and the type of school that Monmouth is. I think it should have definitely made it." The 2021 ranking marked the first appearance of Monmouth University, in which it placed 394. It remained on Forbes' rankings until dropping off in 2024.

Monmouth University has held multiple academic symposia on the work of Bruce Springsteen and houses the Bruce Springsteen Center for American Music.

== Student life ==
=== Activities ===
Monmouth University has a variety of on-campus clubs and organizations, including the campus television station HawkTV; the college radio station WMCX-FM, one of the last media outlets to interview Bob Marley and the first media outlet in America to announce his death; and the student-run newspaper The Outlook, which has been published since 1933.

The Department of Art and Design is an active participant in the arts of Monmouth. It maintains multiple galleries for exhibiting creative works of students, faculty, and staff, as well as practicing artists and designers.

Monmouth University also has its own independent, student run record label, Blue Hawk Records. The music organization allows students to learn hands-on, gaining relevant experience and encountering situations that would occur in the Music Industry. Blue Hawk Records allows students to work together, alongside experienced industry professionals, to build their skills in talent scouting, artist promotion and development, live music and record releases, artwork, packaging, sales, marketing, further learning the structure of business and how to mold artists into marketable material.

=== Greek life ===
==== Fraternities ====
- Kappa Sigma (Upsilon Kappa Chapter)
- Lambda Theta Phi (Pi Chapter)
- Sigma Pi (Delta-Beta Chapter)
- Sigma Tau Gamma (Epsilon Omicron Chapter)
- Tau Delta Phi (Delta Tau Chapter)
- Phi Kappa Psi (New Jersey Beta Chapter)

==== Sororities ====
- Alpha Kappa Alpha (Tau Eta chapter)
- Alpha Omicron Pi (Iota Theta chapter)
- Alpha Sigma Tau (Beta Omega chapter)
- Alpha Xi Delta (Iota Nu chapter)
- Chi Upsilon Sigma (Gamma Beta chapter)
- Delta Phi Epsilon (Delta Omega chapter)
- Lambda Theta Alpha (Tau Chapter)
- Phi Sigma Sigma (Delta Phi chapter)
- Zeta Tau Alpha (Kappa Nu chapter)

=== Student residences ===
- Beechwood Hall
- Cedar Hall
- University Bluffs
- Elmwood Hall
- Garden Apartments
- Great Lawn Apartments
- Laurel Hall
- Maplewood Apartments
- Mullaney Hall
- Hesse Hall
- Oakwood Hall
- Pinewood Hall
- Redwood Hall
- Spruce Hall
- Willow Hall

Monmouth University joined the Colonial Athletic Association on July 1, 2022.

== Athletics ==
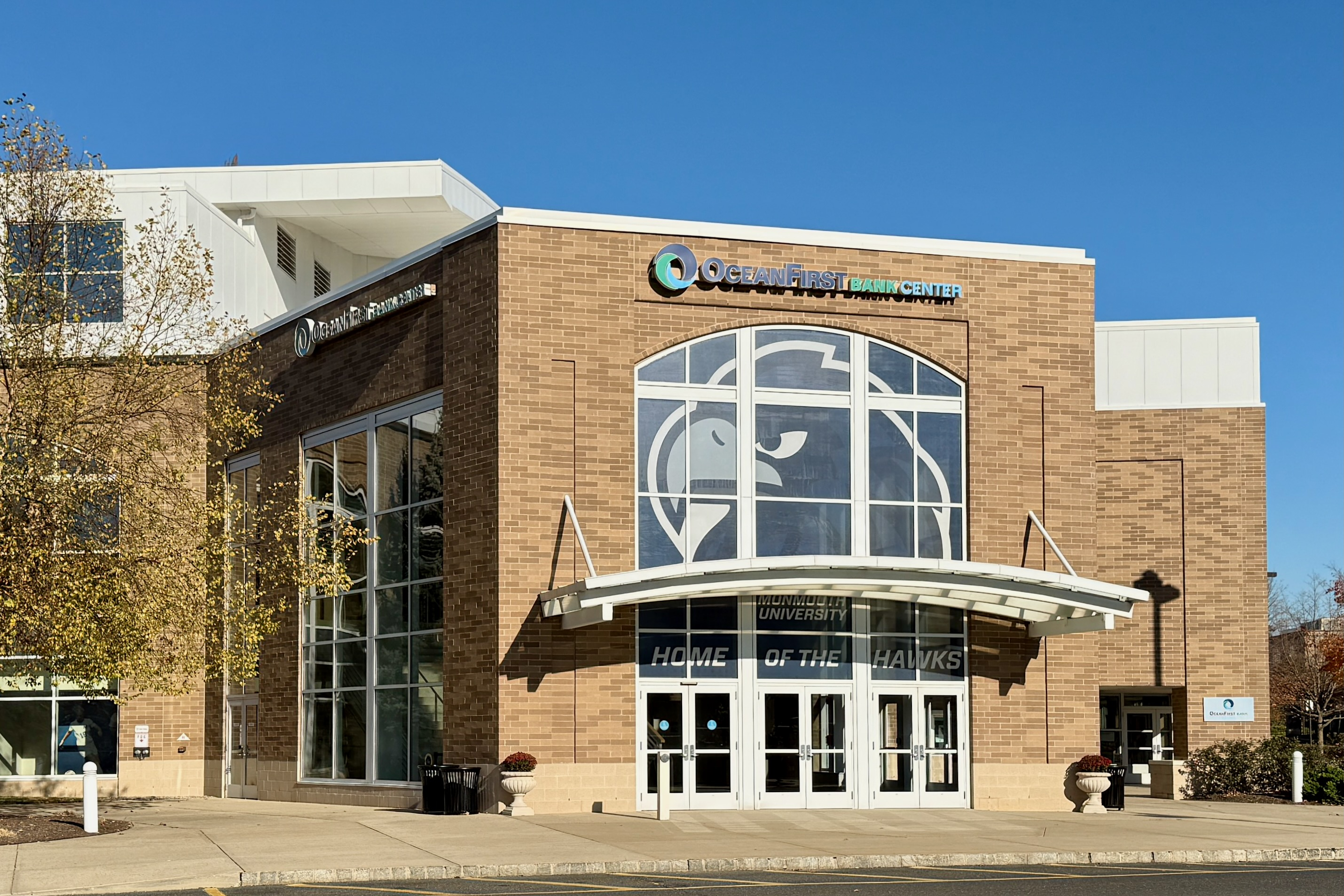
OceanFirst Bank Center

Monmouth's athletic teams are known as the Hawks. The Hawks compete as members of the Coastal Athletic Association. The school had competed as a Division I (NCAA) school in the Metro Atlantic Athletic Conference from 2013 to 2022, with football competing as an FCS independent in the 2013 season before joining the Big South Conference in 2014. Monmouth left the MAAC and joined the CAA on July 1, 2022. Monmouth fields the following sports at the Division I level: baseball, basketball (men's and women's), bowling (women's) cross country (men's and women's), field hockey, football, golf (men's and women's), indoor track (men's and women's), lacrosse (women's and men's), soccer (men's and women's), softball, tennis (men's and women's), and track & field (men's and women's). In the fall of 2014, Monmouth announced the reintroduction of swimming programs (women's and men's) at the Division I level in the fall of 2015.

Monmouth University (then still Monmouth College), added football to the school's ledger of sports teams in 1993. The team's first game was played on September 25 of that year. The first points in school history were scored on a bizarre defensive play by intercepting and returning a two-point conversion.

A new multipurpose activity center opened with a ribbon-cutting ceremony on September 16, 2009. The 153,200-square-foot (14,230 m^{2}) Center currently serves as the primary indoor athletic structure. A partnership agreement with OceanFirst Bank named the facility as the OceanFirst Bank Center in June 2016. It houses a 4,100 seat competition arena; a 200-meter; six-lane indoor track; locker rooms; educational and conference space; ground-level bookstore; and fitness center. The new facility adjoins the William T. Boylan Gymnasium a 2,500-seat arena built in 1965.

Monmouth has been in the NCAA Division I men's basketball tournament in 1996, 2001, 2004, and 2006. Monmouth won their first NCAA men's basketball tournament game in 2006 when they beat Hampton University in that year's play-in game. It was the first time a Northeast Conference school won a game in the NCAA tournament since 1983 when Robert Morris University won in the opening round. Monmouth's men and women's soccer teams as well as baseball, women's lacrosse, men's tennis and men's golf team have also reached the NCAA tournament. The men's lacrosse team made the 2016 NCAA playoff tournament as well. The Monmouth Men's Soccer team is the only sport on campus to ever advance to the second round of the NCAA tournament. The men's soccer team also hosted three first round NCAA Tournament games on The Great Lawn, in 2009, 2010 and 2011. Monmouth's men's soccer team has even been ranked as one of the top teams in the country. In September 2010, Monmouth attained the #4 spot on the NSCAA/HendrickCars.com National Rankings and has been ranked in the national top 25 every single week for the past two seasons. Men's lacrosse won the 2021 MAAC conference championship

== Notable alumni ==
=== Politics and government ===
- Tom Gallagher, American diplomat and the first openly homosexual United States Foreign Service officer
- DiAnne Gove, member of the New Jersey General Assembly
- Noel Lawrence Hillman, United States federal judge
- James W. Holzapfel, member of the New Jersey Senate
- Declan O'Scanlon, member of the New Jersey Senate
- Lori Serrano, former commissioner and chairwoman of the Jersey City Housing Authority
- Mitchell Shivers, former Assistant Secretary of Defense for Asian and Pacific Security Affairs

=== Arts and entertainment ===
- John Barnes, writer, producer and director
- Brute Force (stage name of Stephen Friedland), singer and songwriter
- David J. Burke, producer, screenwriter and film and television director
- Cody Calafiore, actor, model, and television personality featured on Big Brother
- Jeff DeGrandis, animation director and producer
- Siggy Flicker, matchmaker, podcaster, television personality, and writer featured on The Real Housewives of New Jersey
- Brian Hanlon, sculptor
- Jack Lawless, musician and drummer for DNCE
- Amber Marchese, television personality and entrepreneur featured on The Real Housewives of New Jersey
- Matt Morgan, former professional wrestler with WWE and Total Nonstop Action and television personality featured on American Gladiators
- Michael Sorrentino, television personality featured on Jersey Shore
- Terry Spear, author and novelist

=== Sports ===
- Corey Albano, former basketball player in FIBA

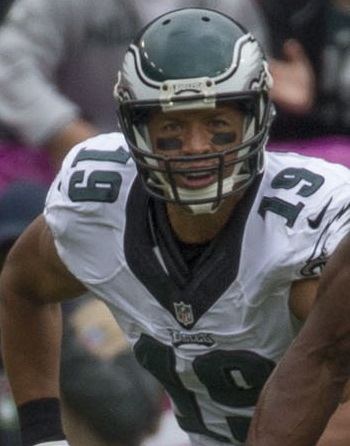
Two-time Pro Bowler Miles Austin was the first Monmouth alumnus in the National Football League

- R. J. Allen, former soccer defender in Major League Soccer
- Miles Austin, American football coach and former wide receiver in the National Football League for the Dallas Cowboys, Cleveland Browns and Philadelphia Eagles
- Alpha Bangura, basketball player in FIBA
- Alex Blackwell, former basketball player in the National Basketball Association for the Los Angeles Lakers
- Wendy Boglioli, former Olympic swimming champion and swimming coach at Yale University
- Brad Brach, baseball pitcher for the Kansas City Royals of Major League Baseball
- Tevrin Brandon, former gridiron football defensive back in the Canadian Football League
- Brian Brikowski, former gridiron football defensive end in the Canadian Football League and the Arena Football League
- Dave Calloway, college basketball coach and former men's basketball head coach at Monmouth
- Jim Carone, college baseball coach and head baseball coach at Wagner College
- Tom DeBlass, mixed martial artist with ONE Championship and formerly with Ultimate Fighting Championship and Bellator MMA
- Jose Gumbs, former American football safety in the National Football League for the Washington Redskins

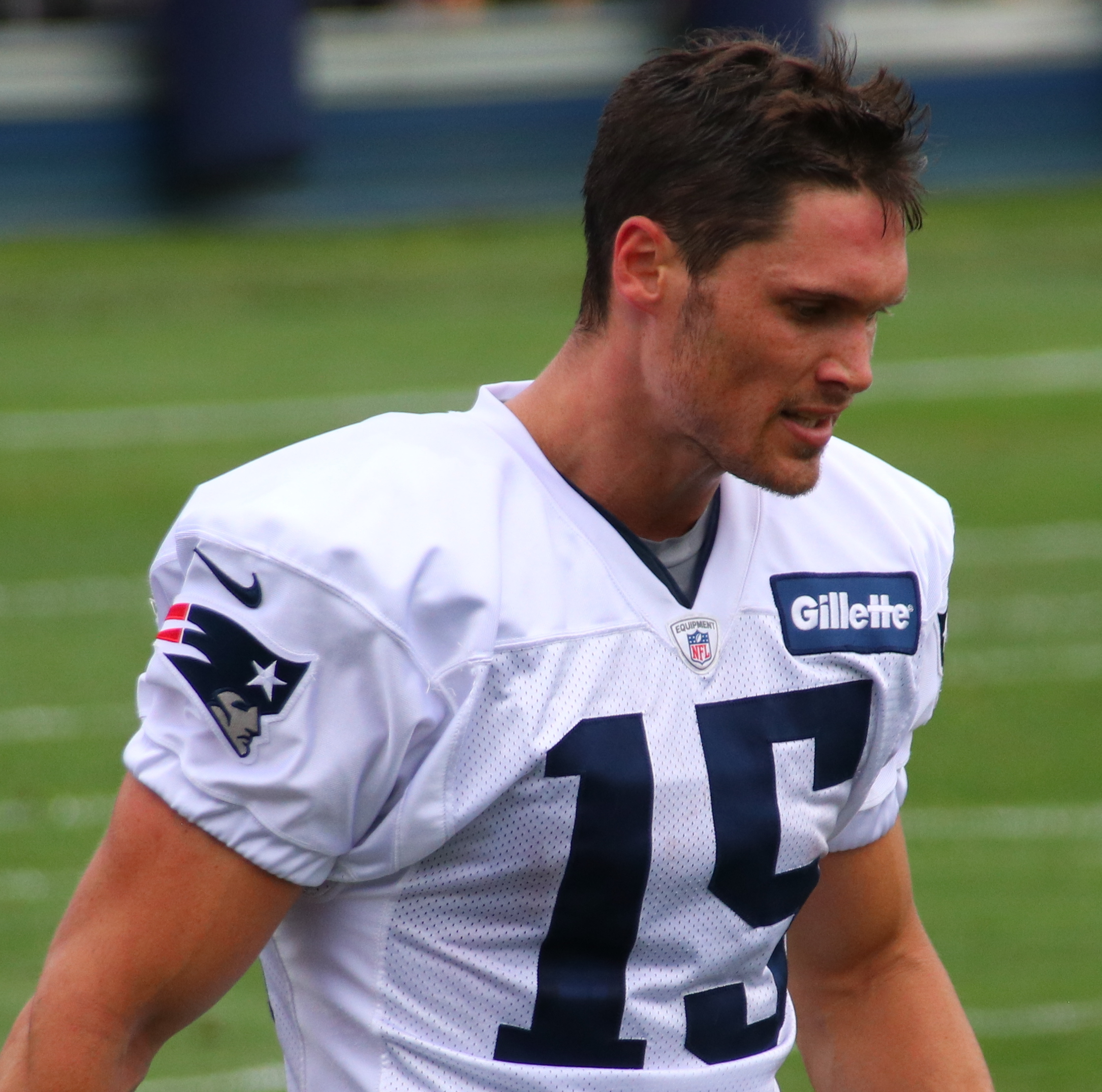
After three seasons of lacrosse at Penn State, two-time Super Bowl winner Chris Hogan used his remaining year of eligibility to play football at Monmouth

- Ed Halicki, former baseball pitcher in Major League Baseball for the San Francisco Giants and California Angels
- Chris Hogan, American football wide receiver for the New England Patriots and New York Jets of the National Football League
- Will Holder, former gridiron football player in the Arena Football League
- Brian Kennedy, college basketball coach and current men's basketball head coach at the New Jersey Institute of Technology
- Ryan Kinne, former soccer player in Major League Soccer
- Eric Klenofsky, soccer goalkeeper for the Toronto FC II of USL League One
- Pat Light, former baseball pitcher in Major League Baseball for the Boston Red Sox and Minnesota Twins
- Derek Luke, soccer player in the USL Championship
- Chuck Martin, college basketball coach and assistant coach at The University of Kentucky

Three-time Olympic gold medalist and two-time FIFA Women's World Cup champion Christie Pearce graduated from Monmouth with a degree in Special Education and holds an honorary degree in Public Service

- Bryan Meredith, soccer goalkeeper for the Vancouver Whitecaps FC of Major League Soccer
- John Nalbone, former American football tight end in the National Football League for the Miami Dolphins, Seattle Seahawks and Dallas Cowboys
- Kevin Owens, former basketball player in FIBA
- Chevannah Paalvast, basketball player for the Canberra Capitals of the Women's National Basketball League
- Ford Palmer, professional middle-distance runner
- Christie Pearce, soccer defender and former captain of the United States women's national soccer team
- Justin Robinson, basketball player for the Élan Chalon of the LNB Pro A
- Greg Soto, mixed martial artist formerly with Ultimate Fighting Championship
- Neal Sterling, former American football tight end in the National Football League for the Jacksonville Jaguars and New York Jets
- Travis Taylor, basketball player for BC Rilski Sportist of the Bulgarian National Basketball League
- Carly Thibault-DuDonis, college basketball coach and head women's basketball coach at Fairfield University
- Hakeem Valles, American football tight end in the National Football League
- Anthony Vázquez, soccer defender formerly with the Puerto Rico national football team

=== Others ===
- William Consovoy, Constitutional rights litigation attorney
- Foster Diebold, former president of Edinboro University of Pennsylvania and the University of Alaska System
- George T. Garrett, US Army major general
- Ron Lapin, Israeli-born American physician
- John Daido Loori, Zen Buddhist priest and founding abbot of Zen Mountain Monastery
- Lee Lozowick, spiritual teacher and author
- Yvonne Thornton, obstetrician and author

== Notable faculty ==
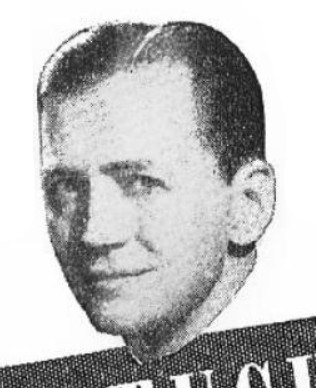
Bandleader Tommy Tucker taught music at Monmouth for 20 years

- Jenny Rosenthal Bramley, dean of mathematics and physicist
- Josh Emmons, professor of English and novelist
- Melissa Febos, professor of English and writer
- Alex Gilvarry, professor of English and novelist
- Amy Handlin, professor of marketing and member of the New Jersey General Assembly
- Eduard Helly, professor of mathematics and mathematician
- Ken Loeffler, professor of law, collegiate and professional basketball coach, and member of the Basketball Hall of Fame
- Joseph W. Oxley, professor of criminal justice, New Jersey Superior Court judge, and former Monmouth County sheriff
- Steven Pressman, professor of economics and finance and economist
- Gerard Scharfenberger, professor of archaeology and member of the New Jersey General Assembly
- Tommy Tucker, professor of music and bandleader
- Michael Waters, professor of English and poet
- Kenneth Womack, professor of English and popular music
- Hettie V. Williams, professor of history, writer, cultural critic, and former president of the African American Intellectual History Society (AAIHS). She is also the author/editor of several books, essays, articles and the recent book The Georgia of the North: Black Women and the Civil Rights Movement in New Jersey (Rutgers University Press, 2024).
