= Rob Shepardson =

American advertising executive

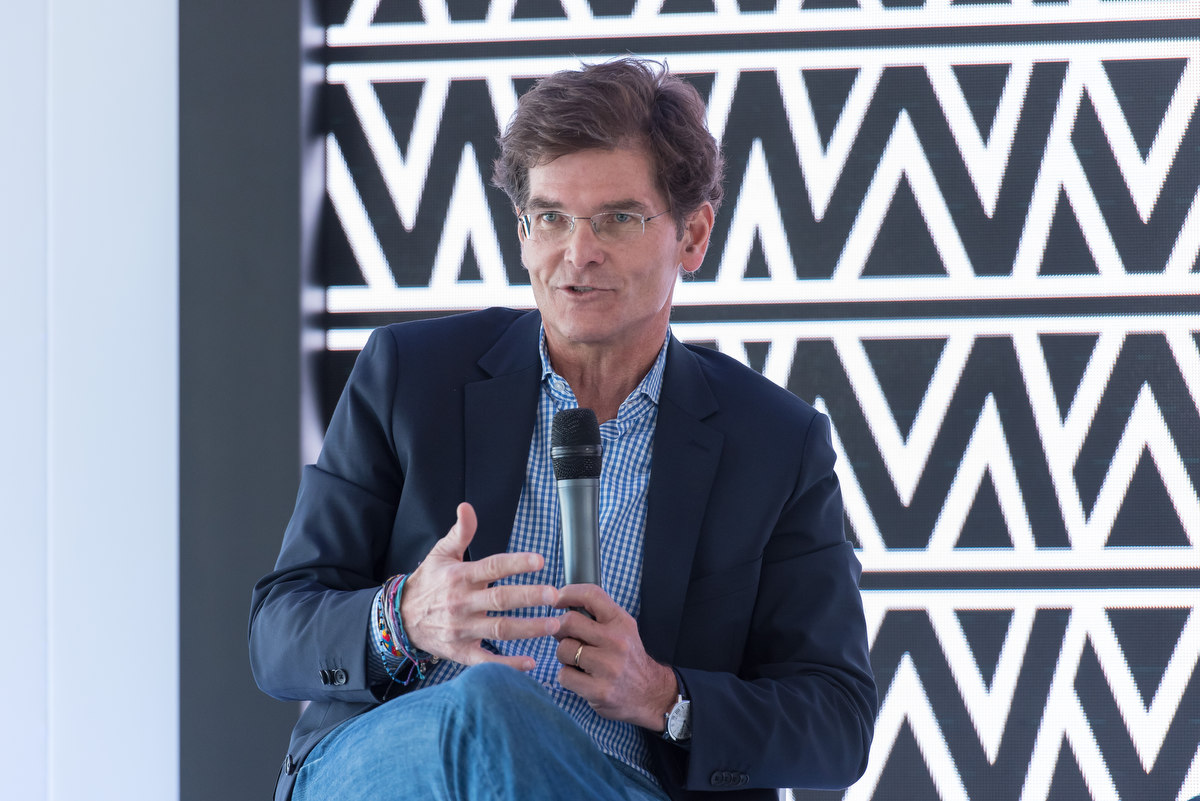
- Education: Franklin and Marshall College (BA); Harvard University (MPP)
- Occupations: Political consultant, marketing strategist, co-founder of SS+K
- Years active: 1993–2026
- Known for: Political campaigns, advertising, advocacy
- Notable work: Barack Obama presidential campaigns (2008, 2012)
- Political party: Democratic
- Spouse: Jane Kimmel (m. 1988)
- Children: 3

Rob Shepardson has worked in politics, advertising, public affairs, and issue advocacy for over 40 years. He co-founded New York creative agency SS+K with Lenny Stern, Mark Kaminsky and David McCall in 1993. That firm carved out a reputation as one of the country's premier marketing, public affairs and advertising firms.

Among its notable work were communications for the presidential campaigns of Barack Obama, Joe Biden and Kamala Harris, the LIVESTRONG Foundation, Bono's ONE Campaign, and hundreds of companies including Delta Airlines, JPMorgan Chase, HBO, and others. The firm was sold to the London-based global advertising network M&C Saatchi in 2014. Shepardson retired from the agency in the summer of 2026.

== Current engagements ==
Shepardson is currently a senior advisor at Bully Pulpit International, a global public affairs and communications firm, and is an advisor at Cortico, a non-profit that works in close, ongoing cooperation with MIT Media Lab's Center for Constructive Communications on human-led, AI-assisted deep qualitative research and AI-powered attitudinal research.

Shepardson is a member of the Council on Foreign Relations, and has been an adjunct faculty member at Columbia University's Mailman School of Public Health for many years. President Obama appointed Shepardson to the President's Council on Sports, Fitness, and Nutrition in 2014.

== Career at SS+K ==
SS+K won numerous accolades during Shepardson's 33 years, including being named one of the 10 most innovative advertising agencies by Fast Company. The firm won multiple awards for creativity and effectiveness, including numerous Cannes Lions.

Shepardson led an array of SS+K's work across the commercial, political and non-profit sectors. In politics he led the firm's appointment as the youth agency for President Barack Obama's historic 2008 and 2012 campaigns, and the Obama White House. He also worked for the Biden/Harris campaign of 2020, the Biden White House, and the Harris Walz campaign in 2024.

On the corporate side, he advised CEOs and other senior executives at Microsoft, HBO, JPMorgan Chase, L'Oréal, Starbucks, Amazon Web Services, Meta, WhatsApp, the NCAA, the Open Society Foundations, the AFL-CIO, and many more.

In the non-profit sector, Shepardson focused on public health, development and healthcare, including LIVESTRONG, for which the agency developed the iconic yellow wristband; the Bill and Melinda Gates Foundation; Let's Move!, former First Lady Michelle Obama's childhood anti-obesity campaign; Mt. Sinai Health System; No Kid Hungry; Planned Parenthood; the United Nations Development Programme; the One Campaign; and others.

Prior to SS+K, Shepardson was a managing director at the Sawyer/Miller Group, an innovative NYC political and corporate consultancy. Among other work, Shepardson advised several heads of state in Latin America and Eastern Europe.

== Personal ==
Shepardson received a Bachelor of Arts from Franklin & Marshall College, with a double major in biology and government. He was an All-American and Academic All-American starting quarterback there for all four years, and was inducted into the school's Sports Hall of Fame in 1993. He earned an NCAA Scholarship to attend John F. Kennedy School of Government at Harvard University, and graduated with a master's degree in public policy in 1985. Shepardson has run eight marathons, including the Boston Marathon two times.

He is married to Jane Kimmel; they have three adult children.
