= Anne Hultgren =

American chemist

- Education: Johns Hopkins University, Franklin and Marshall College
- Scientific career
- Workplaces: Arnold and Mabel Beckman Foundation, United States Department of Homeland Security
- Academic advisors: Christopher S. Chen, Daniel Reich

Anne Hultgren was the Branch Chief for research and development in the Chemical and Biological Defense Division of the Science and Technology Directorate of the United States Department of Homeland Security. She worked in the department from 2005 to 2015. There she helped to develop and test the "Detect-to-Protect" biological detection program. As of February 2015 she became the executive director of the Arnold and Mabel Beckman Foundation.

== Education ==
Hultgren received a B.A. in Physics and Mathematics from Franklin and Marshall College in 1999. She received her Masters of Arts (2002) and Ph.D. in physics (2005) from Johns Hopkins University, where she worked with Daniel Reich and Christopher S. Chen on Cellular manipulation and patterning using ferromagnetic nanowires.

== Career ==
Hultgren joined the Department of Homeland Security in February 2005. She has worked as a technical advisor, program manager, and branch chief. Hultgren was in charge of technology development relating to chemical and biological defense capabilities. These included development of sensors, decontamination methods, and novel assay designs. Her job was to help to "prepare for, respond to, and recover from a possible domestic biological attack".

In the "Detect-to-Protect" biological detection program, Hultgren helped to develop sensors capable of detecting air-borne biological materials, and field tested them in the Boston subway system. Field testing occurred in 2009 and in 2012. Hultgren sprayed dead Bacillus subtilis, a common, non-toxic, food-grade bacterium, in subway tunnels. Working with Massachusetts Bay Transportation Authority, the Massachusetts Department of Public Health, and local public health officials, scientists monitored the dispersion and detection of the bacterium at Davis, Harvard, and Porter stations. The team's goal was to improve the effectiveness of its sensors as a possible early warning system for biological threats. Rather than collecting air filters daily and taking them to a lab for examination, installed sensors continuously monitored air quality by measuring polymerase chain reaction. "Trigger" sensors were installed to establish the usual background levels of biological material, and "confirmers" were tripped when expected levels were exceeded. Thirty minutes after release, a "confirmer" at a station a mile away detected the airborne bacterium. The combination of on site "trigger" and "confirmer" sensors was intended to minimize the occurrence of false alarms, which were a source of complaints with earlier systems.

Hultgren was one of the invited speakers at the 2014 hearings in Washington, D.C., to review the BioWatch program and the effectiveness of PCR-based detection assays used by the United States Post Office.

She was also the program manager in charge of assessing needs and operating procedures for the First Responder Biodetection Technology Report and survey, and developing the Biodetection Guide for First Responders mobile app, released January 8, 2015. Their goal is to ensure that first responders have the up-to-date information that they need.
