= Bath by-election =

Bath by-election may refer to:

- May 1873 Bath by-election
- June 1873 Bath by-election, By-election fought on 27 June 1873
- October 1873 Bath by-election
- 1880 Bath by-election
- 1918 Bath by-election, UK parliamentary election
- 1929 Bath by-election
