= William Rous (14th-century MP) =

Member of the Parliament of England

William Rous (fl. 1390) of Paynestwychene Lane, Bath, Somerset, was an English politician, craftsman and tax collector.

== Family ==
Rous was the son of Henry le Mareschal of Bath by his wife, Alice. He had a brother named John.

== Career ==
He was a member (MP) of the parliament of England for Bath in January 1390. He was Mayor of Bath c. Sept. 1390 – 1391 and in 1392–93.

Parliament of England
Preceded by William Shropshire; Roger Skinner	Member of Parliament for Bath; 1390; With: Richard Clewer	Succeeded by ? ?
