= Clewer (surname) =

Clewer is an English surname derived from the place name Clewer, either in Berkshire or Somerset. Notable people with the surname include:

- Ali Clewer, drummer of Morning Runner
- Brian Clewer, radio host
- Richard Clewer (fl. 1385–1390), English burgess
- Selby Clewer, English architect

== See also ==
- Cluer
