= June 1873 Bath by-election =

By-election fought on 27 June 1873

The 1873 Bath by-election was fought on 27 June 1873. The by-election was fought due to the succession to a peerage of the incumbent MP of the Conservative Party, Viscount Chelsea. It was won by the Conservative candidate Viscount Grey de Wilton.

By-election, 27 June 1873: Bath (1 seat)
Party	Candidate	Votes	%	±%
Conservative	Arthur Egerton	2,194	50.4	+20.1
Liberal	Arthur Hayter	2,143	49.2	−20.5
Independent Liberal	John Charles Cox	15	0.3	New
Majority		51	1.2	N/A
Turnout		4,352	84.0	−2.7
Registered electors		5,182		
Conservative hold		Swing	+20.3	
