= Nicholas Sambourn =

Nicholas Sambourn may refer to:

- Nicholas Sambourn (MP for Bath) (fl.391), MP for Bath
- Nicholas Sambourn (MP for Chippenham and Malmesbury) (fl.1394-5), MP for Chippenham and Malmesbury, son of the MP for Bath
