= Alexander Cadogan =

British civil servant (1938-1946)

The Right Honourable Sir Alexander Cadogan OM GCMG KCB
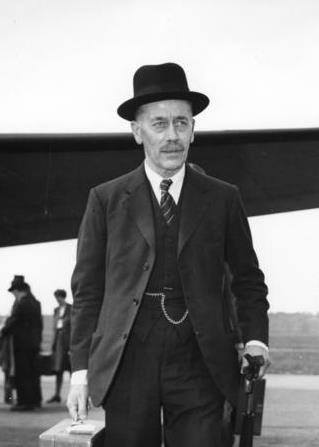
- Sir Alexander Cadogan in 1945.

Permanent Under-Secretary of State for Foreign Affairs
- In office 1938–1946
- Monarch: George VI
- Preceded by: Sir Robert Vansittart
- Succeeded by: Sir Orme Sargent

Personal details
- Born: Alexander Montagu George Cadogan; 25 November 1884 London, England
- Died: 9 July 1968 (aged 83) Westminster, London, England
- Spouse: Lady Theodosia Louisa Acheson (1882–1977)
- Education: Balliol College, Oxford
- Occupation: Diplomat

Sir Alexander Montagu George Cadogan OM GCMG KCB PC (25 November 1884 – 9 July 1968) was a British diplomat and civil servant. He was Permanent Under-Secretary for Foreign Affairs from 1938 to 1946. His long tenure of the Permanent Secretary's office makes him one of the central figures of British policy before and during the Second World War. His diaries are a source of great value and give a sharp sense of the man and his life. Like most senior officials at the Foreign Office, he was bitterly critical of the appeasement policies of the 1930s but admitted that until British rearmament was better advanced, there were few other options. In particular, he stressed that without an American commitment to joint defence against Japan, Britain would be torn between the eastern and western spheres. He was part of the delegation that accompanied Prime Minister of the United Kingdom Winston Churchill at the Atlantic Conference with President of the United States Franklin Roosevelt, where parties agreed to the Atlantic Charter.

== Background and education ==
Cadogan was brought up in a distinguished and wealthy aristocratic family as the seventh son and youngest child of George Cadogan, 5th Earl Cadogan, and his first wife Lady Beatrix Jane Craven, daughter of William Craven, 2nd Earl of Craven. He was the brother of Henry Cadogan, Viscount Chelsea, Gerald Cadogan, 6th Earl Cadogan, William Cadogan, and Sir Edward Cadogan. He was educated at Eton and Balliol College, Oxford, where he read History.

== Early Foreign Service career ==
Cadogan had a distinguished career in the Diplomatic Service, serving from 1908 to 1950. His first posting was to Constantinople, where he "spent two happy years learning the craft of diplomacy and playing upon the head of Chancery a series of ingenious practical jokes." Cadogan's second posting was in Vienna, and during the First World War, he served in the Foreign Office in London.

At the end of the First World War, he served at the Versailles Peace Conference. In 1923, he became the head of the League of Nations section of the Foreign Office and remained quite optimistic about the prospects for the League. He was less confident about the prospects of success for the Disarmament Conference in Geneva and became quite frustrated at the lack of trust necessary for joint disarmament. Performing this work, he developed an appreciation for his Minister, Anthony Eden, thirteen years his junior. Cadogan found him agreeable, and in a 1933 letter to his wife, he wrote, "He seems to me to have a very good idea of what is right and what is wrong, and if he thinks a thing is right he goes all out for it, hard, and if he thinks a thing is wrong, ten million wild hordes won't make him do it." Eden returned the admiration, writing that Cadogan "carried out his thankless task with a rare blend of intelligence, sensibility, and patience."

In 1933, with Adolf Hitler in power and the fate of the Disarmament Conference clear, Cadogan accepted a posting at the British legation in Peking. The family arrived in 1934, after the Nationalist government had evacuated Beijing because of troubles with Japan. He met with Chiang Kai-shek and attempted to persuade him of Britain's support. Despite the lack of a real Chinese government, Cadogan did his best but lacked support from the Foreign Office. In 1935, after his recommendation to extend a loan to the Republic of China was again denied, he wrote that "with all their protestations that they mean to 'stay in China', they do nothing. And 'staying' will cost them something in money or effort or risk. The Chinese are becoming sick of us. And there is no use my 'keeping in touch' with them if I never can give them an encouragement at all".

In 1936, Cadogan received a request from the newly appointed Secretary of State, Anthony Eden, offering him the post of joint Deputy Under-Secretary. He regretted leaving China so suddenly but took up the offer and returned to London. Things there had grown much worse since his departure. Fascist Italy had attacked Abyssinia and Nazi Germany had reoccupied the Rhineland. Assessing the situation, Cadogan advised a revision of the more vindictive elements of the Treaty of Versailles, "which was really more in the nature of an armistice." However, this suggestion was not taken up by Sir Robert Vansittart or Eden. It was felt that modifying the Treaty would only increase Germany's ambitions, a policy of appeasement which only encouraged the Nazi government to ask for more. despite the Cadogan disagreed and wrote in his diary: "I believe that, so long as she is allowed to nurse her resentment to her bosom, her claims increase with her armaments." He wanted to engage Germany in an effort to get German grievances set down on paper and was not as troubled by his colleagues about the possibility of German domination of Central Europe. Cadogan grew impatient with the lack of strategic direction in the Foreign Office. He complained, "It can't be said that our 'policy' so far has been successful. In fact we haven't got a policy; we merely wait to see what will happen to us next".

== Permanent Under-Secretary ==
In 1938, Cadogan replaced Robert Vansittart as Permanent Under-Secretary at the Foreign Office. He considered his predecessor's style to be emotional and disordered compared to his own terse and efficient manner. There were, however, no significant divergences in policy although Vansittart's detestation of the dictators was more publicly known. Cadogan served in this capacity from 1938 to 1946 and represented Britain at the Dumbarton Oaks Conference in 1944, where he became well acquainted with Edward Stettinius and Andrei Gromyko. His work there was greatly respected. Winston Churchill told Parliament, "His Majesty's Government could have had no abler representative that Sir Alexander Cadogan and there is no doubt that a most valuable task has been discharged." Cadogan also accompanied Churchill to the Atlantic Conference in Placentia Bay, Newfoundland, aboard HMS Prince of Wales, acting as President Franklin D. Roosevelt in dress rehearsals to help him prepare.

In preparation for the Yalta Conference, Cadogan expended a great deal of effort attempting to bring the "London Poles" under Stanislaw Mikolajczyk around to the idea of losing their eastern territories to the Soviet Union. After 22,000 Polish officers and intellectuals were shot by the Soviet Red Army in the Katyn massacre, Cadogan wrote in his diary on 18 June 1943 that "years before Katyn the Soviet Government made a habit of butchering their own citizens by the 10,000s, and if we could fling ourselves into their arms in 1941, I don't know that Katyn makes our position more delicate. The blood of Russians cries as loud to heaven as that of Poles. But it's very nasty. How can Poles ever live amicably alongside Russians, and how can we discuss with Russians execution of German 'war criminals', when we have condoned this?" He was also involved in discussions about the composition of provisional governments in Yugoslavia and Greece. Cadogan then accompanied the British delegation to the Yalta Conference in 1945. David Dilks, the editor of his published diaries, notes, "He looked on Yalta much as he had looked at Munich. Both agreements entailed serious injury to the rights of states which could not defend themselves against large and predatory neighbours; both reflected the military and geographical facts; neither was a matter for pride or for fierce self-reproach, since it hardly lay in British power at the material time to do other; both looked better on signature than in the hard after-light." Cadogan wrote in his diary in January 1944: "They [the Soviet diplomats] are the most stinking creepy set of Jews I've ever come across." At the same time, he defended the Yalta Conference as relatively successful, writing “We have got an agreement on Poland which may heal differences, for some time at least, and assure some degree of independence for the Poles.”

== United Nations ==
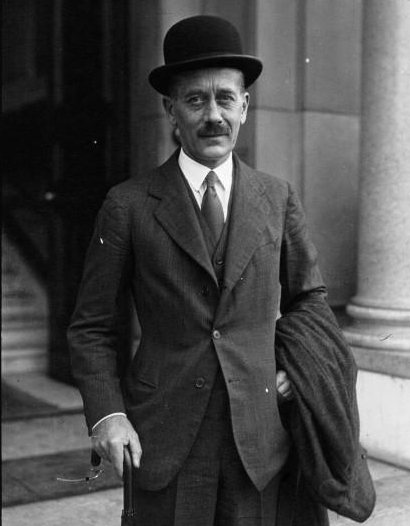
Cadogan in 1933.

At the end of the war Cadogan had hoped for the Washington embassy but it went to another capable career diplomat, Sir Archibald Clark Kerr. Instead, it was probably his experience with the League of Nations and his prominent role at Dumbarton Oaks that made Clement Attlee appoint Cadogan the first Permanent Representative of the United Kingdom to the United Nations even though most other countries chose politicians with ministerial experience. He served in this capacity from 1946 to 1950. During his time at the UN, as David Dilks points out, "British diplomacy had to be conducted from a precarious position of over-commitment and economic instability." Cadogan expressed great frustration with the inflexibility of his Soviet counterparts, who were forbidden from mixing with other delegations or informal exchanges of views. At one point, he asked himself, "How can ten men discuss with a ventriloquist's doll?" He saw many parallels between Soviet actions at the beginning of the Cold War and those of the Germans on the eve of the Second World War. He remarked to Winston Churchill, "What forces itself on one's attention is the degree to which everything favours the evildoer, if he is blatant enough. Any honest Government fights (in peacetime) with two hands tied behind its back. The brilliant blatancy of the Russians is something that we can admire but cannot emulate. It gives them a great advantage." Although he was never celebrated as a public figure, Cadogan enjoyed great prestige within diplomatic circles. He was widely respected for his ability, character and experience. He and his wife cultivated a large and varied number of friends by entertaining at their Long Island home, Hillandale.

== Later life ==
In 1952, Cadogan was made Chairman of Board of Governors of the BBC by Winston Churchill, who had returned to office the previous year. When Cadogan expressed his concern that he lacked appropriate qualifications, Churchill replied, "There are no qualifications. All you have to do is to be fair". Cadogan added, "And sensible, I suppose". Churchill nodded. On his appointment, he confessed that he had never seen a BBC Television programme and that what he had seen of American television, he disliked. He served until 1957. In the last decade of his life, Cadogan gradually shed his commitments and devoted more time to his late-blooming interest in art. His diaries were published posthumously by Cassell in 1971, under the title The Diaries of Alexander Cadogan O.M. 1938-1945, and edited by David Dilks.

== Honours ==
Cadogan was made Companion of the Order of St Michael and St George (CMG) in the 1926 Birthday Honours, a Companion of the Order of the Bath (CB) in the 1932 Birthday Honours, a Knight Commander of the Order of St Michael and St George (KCMG) in the 1934 New Year Honours, a Knight Grand Cross of the Order of St Michael and St George (GCMG) in the 1939 New Year Honours, a Knight Commander of the Order of the Bath (KCB) in the 1941 New Year Honours, admitted to the Privy Council in the 1946 Birthday Honours and appointed to the Order of Merit in 1951.

== Family ==
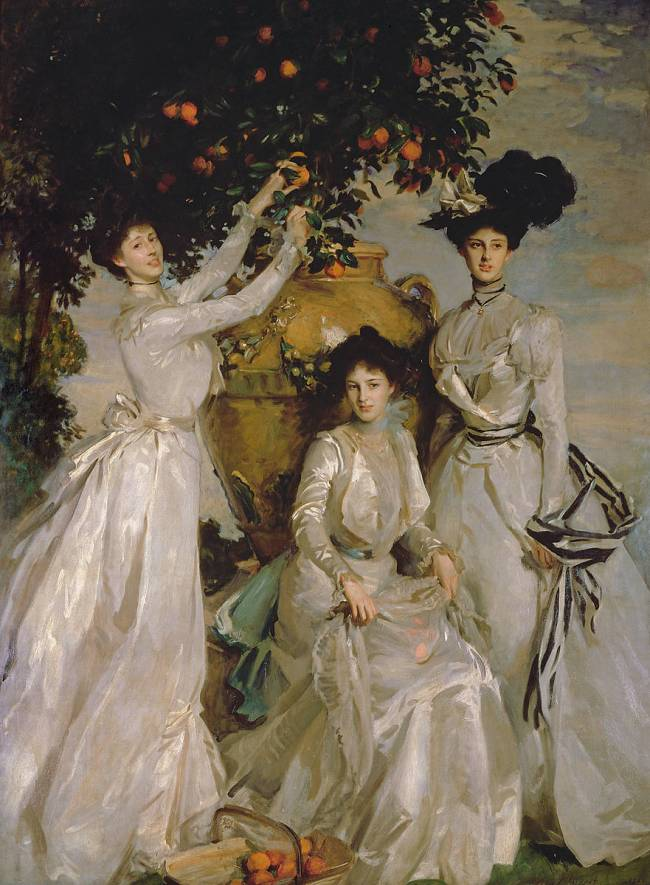
The Acheson Sisters (Ladies Alexandra, Mary and Theo Acheson), John Singer Sargent, 1902

Cadogan married Lady Theodosia Acheson, daughter of Archibald Acheson, 4th Earl of Gosford, in 1912. They had a son and three daughters. He died in July 1968, aged 83. Lady Theodosia Cadogan died in October 1977.

Political offices
Preceded by Sir Robert Vansittart	Permanent Under-Secretary for Foreign Affairs; 1938–1946	Succeeded by Orme Sargent
Media offices
Preceded by Ernest Simon	Chairman of the BBC Board of Governors; 1952–1957	Succeeded by Sir Arthur fforde
