= Henry Bartlett =

Henry Bartlett may refer to:

- Sir David Bartlett, 3rd Baronet ( Henry David Hardington Bartlett, 1912–1989), British fencer
- Henry Bartlett (MP) (fl. 1406–1410), MP for Bath

== See also ==
- Bartlett (disambiguation)
