= Robert Newlyn =

Robert Newlyn may refer to:

- Robert Newlyn (priest) (1597–1688), English clergyman and academic
- Robert Newlyn (MP) (fl. 1421), English politician
