= Charles Palmer (MP for Bath) =

English Whig and Liberal politician

Major-General Charles Palmer
- Born: 6 May 1777; Weston, Bath
- Died: 17 April 1851 (aged 73); London
- Burial place: Kensal Green Cemetery
- Education: Eton College; Oriel College, Oxford
- Military career
- Allegiance: United Kingdom
- Branch: British Army
- Service years: 1796–1825
- Rank: Major-general
- Unit: 10th Light Dragoons
- Conflicts: Napoleonic Wars; Peninsular War; Battle of Sahagún; Battle of Benavente; Battle of Orthez; Battle of Toulouse

Member of Parliament for Bath
- In office 1808–1826
- In office 1830–1837

Charles Palmer (6 May 1777 – 17 April 1851) was an English military officer, vine-grower, and politician of the Whig and Liberal parties who sat in the House of Commons in two periods between 1808 and 1837.

Palmer was born at Weston near Bath, the son of John Palmer, who had introduced the use of mail coaches. He was educated at Eton College and Oriel College, Oxford and entered the army as cornet in the 10th Dragoons in May 1796.

In 1808 he was elected member of parliament (MP) for Bath.

Palmer served with his regiment during the Peninsular war and acted as lieutenant-colonel from May 1810 to November 1814. The Prince Regent appointed him as an aide-de-camp on 8 February 1811, and he held the rank until promoted major-general on 27 May 1825.

Palmer held his seat at Bath until 1826. At the 1829 election, there was a double return and in the following by-election he lost. However he was re-elected for Bath in 1830 and held the seat until 1837.

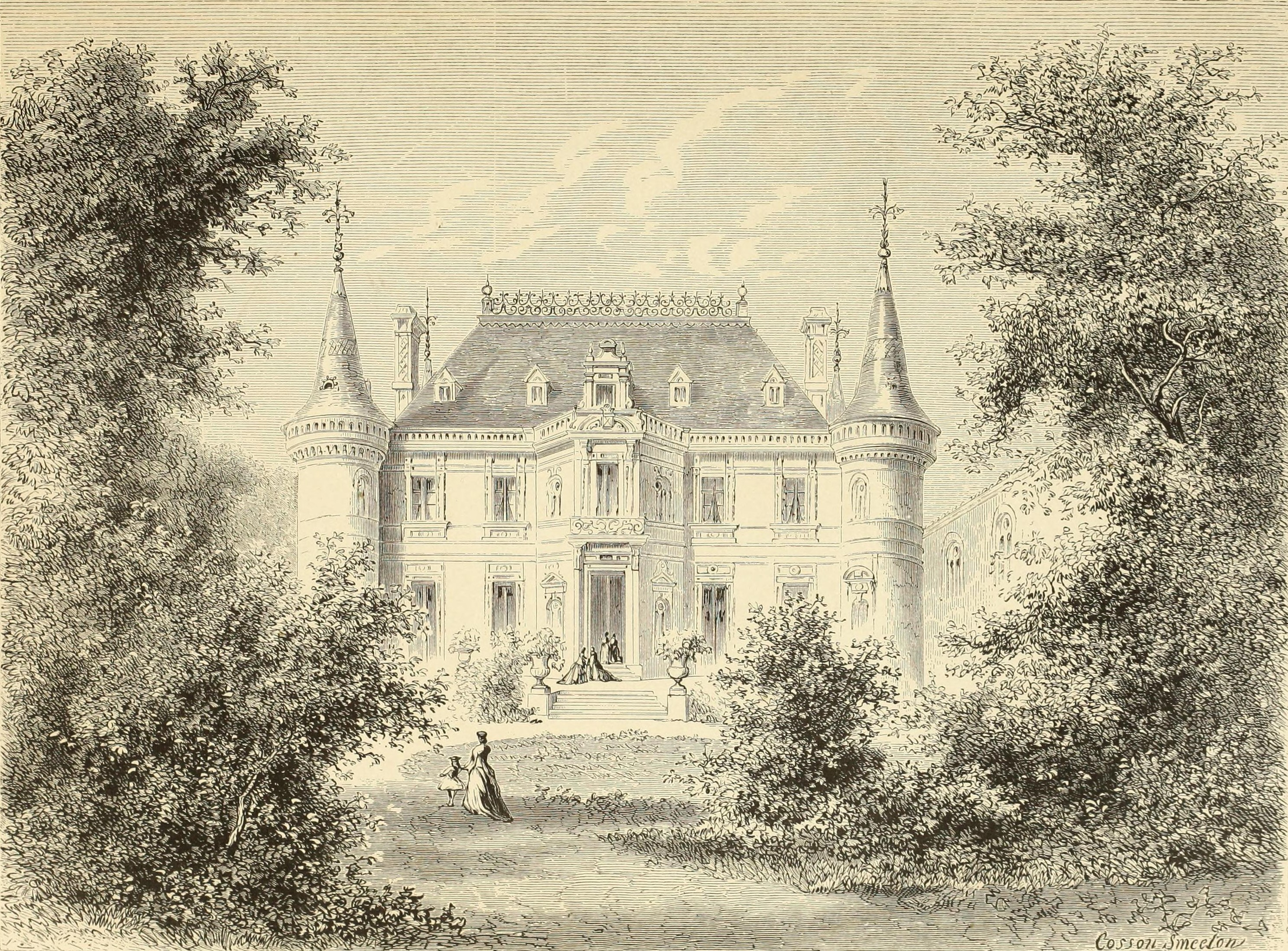
Château Palmer in 1838

Palmer was a large vine-grower at Château Palmer in the Gironde and on the death of his father also became the proprietor of the Bath Theatre Royal.

He died at the age of 73. By the time of his death, he was a bankrupt due to the costs involved in running his vineyards, and had sold the Bath Theatre Royal; he was reduced to begging on the streets of London, 'shunned where he once was courted.' He had married Mary Elizabeth Atkyns, eldest daughter of John Thomas Atkyns of Huntercombe House, Buckinghamshire.

Parliament of the United Kingdom
Preceded by John Palmer; Lord John Thynne	Member of Parliament for Bath; 1808 – 1826; With: Lord John Thynne	Succeeded by Earl of Brecknock; Lord John Thynne
Preceded by Earl of Brecknock; Lord John Thynne	Member of Parliament for Bath; 1830 – 1837; With: Lord John Thynne; John Arthur Roebuck	Succeeded by William Bruges; Viscount Powerscourt
