= October 1873 Bath by-election =

UK parliamentary by-election

The 1873 Bath by-election was fought on 8 October 1873. The by-election was fought due to the death of the incumbent MP of the Liberal Party, Donald Dalrymple. It was won by the Liberal candidate Arthur Hayter.

By-election, 9 Oct 1873: Bath (1 seat)
| Party | Candidate | Votes | % | ±% |
|---|---|---|---|---|
| Liberal | Arthur Hayter | 2,210 | 50.9 | −18.8 |
| Conservative | William Forsyth | 2,071 | 47.7 | +17.4 |
| Independent Liberal | Charles Thompson | 57 | 1.3 | N/A |
| Majority | | 139 | 3.2 | +0.8 |
| Turnout | | 4,338 | 83.7 | −3.0 |
| Registered electors | | 5,182 | | |
| Liberal hold | | Swing | -18.1 | |
