= Ayshe =

Ayshe is a surname. Notable people with the surname include:

- John Ayshe, English politician
- Thomas Ayshe (died 1587), English politician

== See also ==
- Ashe (name)
