= Charles Bonnor =

English actor and dramatist

- Died: Gloucester
- Occupations: Actor and dramatist

Charles Bonnor (fl. 1777–1829?) was an English actor and dramatist.

== Biography ==
Bonnor was the son of a distiller in Bristol. After commencing life as apprentice to a coachmaker, he appeared on the Bath stage on 4 October 1777 as Belcour, in Cumberland's comedy 'The West Indian.' He remained at Bath until the close of the season 1782-3, playing such characters as Charles Surface, Ranger, Touchstone, &c. On 7 July 1783 he appeared for his farewell benefit as Mercutio, and Puff in the 'Critic,' and announced his forthcoming departure for London. On 19 September 1783 lie made, as Brazen in the 'Recruiting Ofticer,' his first appearance at Covent Garden, speaking an address in which he introduced himself and Miss Scrace from Bath, and Mrs. Chalmers from York (Genest), or Norwich (Biographia Dramatica), who made their first appearance in the same piece. In London, as in Bath, his reception was favourable. At Covent Garden he produced for his benefit, on 6 May 1785, an interlude, called 'The Manager in Spite of Himself,' in which he played all the characters but one. This was followed at the same theatre, on 20 December 1790, by a pantomime adapted from the French, and entitled 'Picture of Paris.' Neither of these pieces has been printed. Before the production of the first, Bonnor's direct connection as an actor with Covent Garden had been interrupted. In the year 1784 Bonnor was sent over by Harris, of Covent Garden, for the purpose of establishing an English theatre in Paris. So prosperous were at first the negotiations, that the 'superb theatre which constitutes one of the grand divisions of the Thuilleries' was taken. The patronage of the Queen of France, on which he had counted, was withdrawn, and the scheme was abandoned. Meanwhile John Palmer, the owner of the Bath theatre, and the first proprietor of mail-coaches, who had been appointed comptroller-general of the post-office, availed himself of the abilities of Bonnor in the arrangement of his scheme for the establishment of a mail-coach service. This led to the appointment of Bonnor as deputy-comptroller of the post-office, and his consequent retirement from the stage. In the Royal Calendar for 1788, Charles Bonner (sic) first appears as resident surveyor of the general post-office, and also as the deputy-surveyor and comptroller-general in the same office, with a salary of 500l. In the Royal Calendar of 1793 his name appears for the only time as the resident surveyor and comptroller of the inland department of the general post-office, with a salary of 700l. When Palmer vacated his functions (in 1792, according to Rose’s ‘Biographical Diclionary,' in 1795, according to the ‘ Biographia Dramatica’), Bonnor succeeded to the comptrollership of the inland department of the post-office. This he held two years. Changes were then made in the post-office, the comptrollership was abolished, and Bonnor retired on a pension. He published: 1. ‘Mr. Palmer's Case explained . . . 1797.' 2. ‘Letter to Hobhouse, Esq., M.P., on the subject of Mr. Palmer's Claim . . . 1800.' 3. ‘Vindication against certain Callunnies on the subject of Mr. Palmer’s Claim.' 4to, 1800. In the ‘return of persons now or formerly belonging to the post-office department who receive pensions,' contained in the Parliamentary Papers for 1829, xi. 229, the name of Charles Bonnor appears as receiving a pension of 460l., granted him from 1795 ‘for office abolished.' This return is dated 26 March 1827, at which date Bonnor was assumably alive. In the ‘Gentleman’s Magazine’ for 1829, i, 651, the death at Gloucester of a Mr. Charles Bonnor is chronicled.
