= Sewal =

Sewal may refer to:

== Given name ==
- Sewal Fraunceys, English politician
- Sewal de Bovil

== Places ==
- Sewal, Iowa
- Sewal, Indiana
