= William G. S. Cadogan =

English cricketer and British Army officer (1879–1914)

Major William George Sydney Cadogan MVO
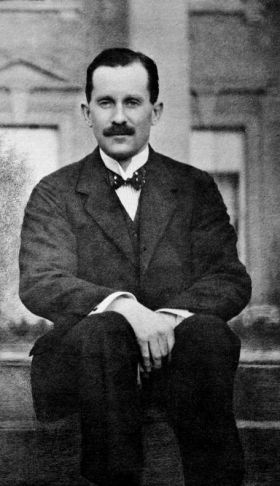
- Major William Cadogan
- Born: 31 January 1879; Chelsea, London
- Died: 12 November 1914 (aged 35); Ypres, France
- Resting place: Ypres Town Cemetery
- Parents: 5th Earl Cadogan (father); Lady Beatrix Jane Craven (mother)
- Relatives: Henry Cadogan (brother); Gerald Cadogan (brother); Edward Cadogan (brother); Alexander Cadogan (brother); William Brownlow (brother-in-law); Samuel Scott (brother-in-law); 2nd Earl Craven (maternal grandfather)
- Military career
- Allegiance: United Kingdom
- Branch: British Army
- Service years: 1896–1914
- Rank: Major
- Conflicts: Second Boer War; Relief of Kimberley; World War I; First Battle of Ypres
- Cricket career

Cricket information

Domestic team information
- Years: Team
- 1904: Europeans

Career statistics
Competition	First-class
Matches	1
Runs scored	0
Batting average	0.00
100s/50s	0/0
Top score	0
Catches/stumpings	1/–
- Source: CricInfo, 30 November 2014

Major William George Sydney Cadogan MVO (31 January 1879 – 12 November 1914) was a British Army officer killed in the First World War. A son of the 5th Earl Cadogan, he had previously served in the Boer War, and was equerry to the Prince of Wales (later Edward VIII) from 1912 to 1914. He also played a single match of first-class cricket, for the Europeans team in the 1904 Bombay Presidency Match.

== Early life and family ==
Cadogan was born in Chelsea, London. He was the fifth of seven sons born to the 5th Earl Cadogan and his wife, Lady Beatrix Jane Craven, a daughter of the 2nd Earl of Craven. The third son, Gerald Cadogan, succeeding to the earldom upon his father's death. Two other sons, Henry and Edward, were Conservative MPs, while another, Alexander, was a senior diplomat. William Cadogan was educated at Eton, where he played cricket for the school's First XI. From November 1896, he was a second lieutenant in the 4th (Eton College) Volunteer Battalion of The Oxfordshire Light Infantry. He went on to the Royal Military College, Sandhurst, and on 22 February 1899 joined the 10th Royal Hussars. Cadogan saw action in the Second Boer War, where he was present at the Relief of Kimberley and for operations in the Transvaal, the Orange Free State, and the Cape Colony. He was promoted to lieutenant on 1 June 1900, while in South Africa. Following the end of the war in 1902 his regiment went to India. Cadogan joined almost 375 officers and men of the 10th Hussars who left Cape Town on the SS Lake Manitoba in September 1902, arriving at Bombay the following month, and was then stationed at Mhow in Bombay Presidency. He was promoted to captain in March 1904.

== Cricket ==
Apart from playing at Eton, Cadogan had also played several matches of cricket whilst in Ireland in 1896. He often played alongside one or two of his brothers, appearing for an I Zingari team, for an amateur "Eton Ramblers" side, and teams representing the Viceroy and the Lord Chief Justice. None of these games were accorded first-class status, although many of the players featured went on to play at higher levels, most notably Bernard Bosanquet, who played at Test level for England.

Whilst in India in August 1904, Cadogan played his only first-class cricket match for the Europeans against the Parsees in the annual Bombay Presidency Match, hosted by the Bombay Gymkhana. The Europeans were comprehensively beaten, losing by 180 runs after being dismissed for 48 in their first innings and 40 in their second. The Europeans' second innings featured five ducks. Cadogan himself made a pair.

== Later life and death ==
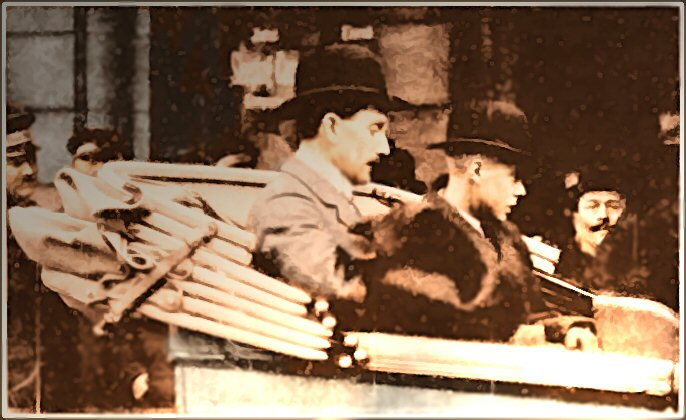
1913 Touring in Germany with the Prince of Wales: Major Cadogan, the Prince's Equerry

In March 1906, Cadogan was made Honorary Aide-de-Camp to George, Prince of Wales (later George V), with a corresponding appointment to the Royal Victorian Order, as a Member, Fourth Class (MVO). From September 1912, he was Equerry to Edward, Prince of Wales (later Edward VIII), having been promoted major the previous year. In that role, he accompanied the Prince during his time at Magdalen College, Oxford. The Prince's father, the King, was horrified at his riding technique, and had Cadogan make the Prince ride four hours a week in the hope of improving it.

The 10th Hussars, Cadogan's unit when not on the General Staff, was one of the many cavalry units in the British Expeditionary Force during the first months following the outbreak of the First World War. They departed Southampton on 7 October 1914 and arrived in Ostend the following day, subsequently joining the 6th Cavalry Brigade. The regiment was organised into three squadrons, with Cadogan in command of "C" Squadron. On 12 November 1914, during the First Battle of Ypres, Cadogan was shot in the groin, and "died almost immediately". Aged 35 at the time of his death, he was buried at Ypres Town Cemetery. The inscription on his gravestone reads: TELL ENGLAND YE THAT PASS THIS WAY THAT HE WHO RESTS HERE DIED CONTENT.

== Honours ==

Member (4th Class) of the Royal Victorian Order (MVO)	1906	Upon being appointed Honorary Aide-de-Camp to George, Prince of Wales
Cross of Honour of the Order of the Crown (Kingdom of Württemberg)	1906	Upon being appointed Honorary Aide-de-Camp to George, Prince of Wales
King's South Africa Medal	1902	
Queen's South Africa Medal	1902	

== See also ==
- List of cricketers who were killed during military service
