= John Reynold =

16th-century English politician

John Reynold (fl. 1539) was an English politician.

He was a member (MP) of the parliament of England for Bath in 1539. He has not been further identified.
