= John Haygoby =

English politician

John Haygoby (fl. 1402) of Bath, Somerset, was an English politician.

He was a Member (MP) of the Parliament of England for Bath in 1402.
