= Thomas Rymour =

English politician

Thomas Rymour (died 26 February 1408) of Bath, Somerset, was an English politician.

He was a member (MP) of the parliament of England for Bath in 1406. He committed suicide, burning down his chamber the day after he and his sister-in-law, who apparently perished in the same fire, both made wills.
