= Thomas Ryton =

English politician

Thomas Ryton (fl. 1393) was an English politician.

He was a member (MP) of the parliament of England for Bath in 1393.
