= Bath (constituency) =

Parliamentary constituency in the United Kingdom, 1295 onwards

Coordinates: 51.38°N 2.36°W

- County constituency for the House of Commons
- Boundary of Bath in South West England
- County: Somerset
- Population: 88,859 (2011 census)
- Electorate: 73,241 (2023)

Current constituency
- Created: 1295
- Member of Parliament: Wera Hobhouse (Liberal Democrats)
- Seats: Two (1295–1918); One (1918–present)

Bath is a constituency in the House of Commons of the Parliament of the United Kingdom, represented since 2017 by Wera Hobhouse of the Liberal Democrats. Its previous representatives have included William Pitt the Elder (Prime Minister 1766–1768) and Chris Patten, the last Governor of Hong Kong (1992–1997).

In the 2023 periodic review of Westminster constituencies, at the 2024 general election the seat was subject to moderate boundary changes which involved the gain of the Bathavon North ward from the former North East Somerset constituency.

== Constituency profile ==
The Bath constituency is located in Somerset and covers the eastern part of the Bath and North East Somerset local government area. It contains the city of Bath and rural areas to its north and east.

Bath is a spa town and tourist destination, popular for its Georgian architecture and proximity to the Cotswolds. It is the only city in the United Kingdom to be named a UNESCO World Heritage Site. Residents of the constituency are generally younger, wealthier and more likely to be degree-educated than the rest of the country, and house prices are high. At the most recent local council elections in 2023, most seats in the city were won by the Liberal Democrats. The constituency voted overwhelmingly to remain in the European Union in the 2016 referendum; it is estimated that 68% of voters opposed Brexit, one of the top 50 highest rates out of 650 constituencies.

== History ==
Bath is an ancient constituency which has been constantly represented in Parliament since boroughs were first summoned to send members in the 13th century.

=== Unreformed constituency before 1832 ===
Bath was one of the cities summoned to send members in 1295 and represented ever since, although Parliaments in early years were sporadic. Like almost all English constituencies before the Great Reform Act 1832, it originally returned two members to each Parliament.

The precise way in which Bath's MPs were chosen in the Middle Ages is unknown. It is recorded that "election was by the Mayor and three citizens being sent from thence to the county court who in the name of the whole community, and by the assent of the community, returned their representatives"; but whether the "assent of the community" was real or what form it took is unrecorded, even assuming it was not a completely dead letter. By the 17th century, elections had become more competitive, as the means of election in Bath had become a franchise restricted to the Mayor, Aldermen, and members of the Common Council (the City Corporation), a total of thirty voters. The freemen of the city challenged this state of affairs in 1661 and again in 1705, claiming the right to vote and petitioning against the election of the candidates chosen by the corporation, but on both occasions the House of Commons, which at the time was still the final arbiter of such disputes, decided against them. The Commons resolution of 27 January 1708, "That the right of election of citizens to serve in Parliament for this city is in the mayor, aldermen and common-council only", settled the matter until 1832.

Bath was the most populous of the English boroughs where the right to vote was restricted to the corporation. At the time of the 1801 census, it was one of the ten largest towns or cities in England by population, and was almost unique in that the voters generally exercised their powers independently. As was the case elsewhere, the Common Council was not popularly elected, all vacancies being filled by co-option by the existing members, so that once a united interest had gained majority control it was easy to retain it. Most corporation boroughs quickly became pocket boroughs in this way, the nomination of their members of parliament being entirely decided by a patron who may have given some large benefaction to the area or simply used bribery to ensure only his supporters or croneys became members of the corporation. But in Bath, the Common Council retained its independence in most periods and took pride in electing two suitable members of parliament who had either strong local connections or else a national reputation. Nor was there any suggestion of bribery or other corruption, prolific in other "independent" constituencies. Pitt the Elder wrote to the corporation in 1761, on the occasion of his re-election as one of Bath's members, to pay tribute to "a city ranked among the most ancient and most considerable in the kingdom, and justly famed for its integrity, independence, and zeal for the public good".

But even in Bath the limited electorate who voted for its members of Parliament expected them to work to procure favours for their constituents and enterprises to a degree that would be considered corrupt today. By exercising efforts successfully in this direction, the representatives could in return expect a degree of influence over the voters that differed little from patronage in the pocket boroughs, except that its duration was limited. Thus the lawyer Robert Henley, a Bath MP from 1747 and also Recorder of Bath from 1751, seems to have been assumed to have control over both seats while he held one of them and immediately after; yet when he gained a peerage and thus a seat in the House of Lords, Pitt replaced him on the understanding of being independently chosen. Pitt himself then acquired similar influence: the council vetoed Viscount Ligonier's suggestion that he should be succeeded by his nephew when he was elevated the Lords in 1763, but instead allowed Pitt to nominate a candidate to be his new colleague, and voted overwhelmingly for him when he was opposed by a local man. But Pitt's influence also waned when he fell out with the council over the Treaty of Paris later in 1763.

In the final years before the Reform Act 1832, however, local magnates exerted a more controlling influence in Bath. Oldfield, writing early in the 19th century, stated that at that time the Marquess of Bath nominated one member and John Palmer the other; both were former members of Parliament for the city (Lord Bath having sat as Viscount Weymouth, before his father's death took him to the Lords), but neither was then in the Commons – each had a relation sitting as one of the members for Bath. Palmer had succeeded Earl Camden (Note: Formerly known as John Jeffreys Pratt) who held one of the two seats before 1802. At the time of the Reform Act 1832, Lord Bath was still being listed as influencing one of the seats, although the second was considered independent once more.

=== Reformed constituency (1832–1918) ===
The Reform Act 1832 opened up the franchise to all resident (male) householders whose houses had a value of at least £10 a year and imposed uniform voting provisions for all the boroughs. Bath was one of the boroughs which continued to elect two members. Given the city's medium size and its generally high property values, its electorate increased by a factor of almost 100 (Note: 2,853 voters registered at the first reformed election, in December 1832)), from 30 in 1831 to 2,853 in 1832, and created a competitive and generally marginal constituency which swung between Whig and Tory (later Liberal and Conservative) control. The parliamentary borough's boundaries were also slightly extended, but only to take in those areas into which the built-up area of the city had expanded. Bath's most notable member during this period was probably the Conservative social reformer Lord Ashley, better remembered under his eventual title of 7th Earl of Shaftesbury, for the Factory Acts, the first of which came into effect while he was one of the MPs for Bath.

The franchise was further reformed in 1867 and by the Redistribution of Seats Act 1885, with only minor boundary changes. Bath was lucky to retain its two-member representation in the 1885 reforms, as its electorate of under 7,000 was near the lower limit, and this situation lasted until the 1918 reforms. The continued Liberal strength was unusual for a prosperous and predominantly middle-class town, and the seats could until 1918 not be considered safe for the Conservatives.

=== Modern single-member constituency (since 1918) ===
Bath's representation was reduced to a single member in 1918. The Conservatives held the seat continuously until 1992, except in the 1923 Parliament, and until World War II generally won comfortably – the Liberals retained such strength that the non-Conservative vote was split, and Labour could not rise above third place until the landslide of 1945, when the Conservative James Pitman achieved a very marginal majority. From 1945 to 1970, Labour presented the main challenge, and came within 800 votes of taking the seat in 1966.

The Liberal revival in the 1970s saw the two more left-wing parties swap places, helped by the adoption of a nationally known candidate, Christopher Mayhew, who had defected from the Labour Party. The formation of the SDP–Liberal Alliance made Bath a realistic target. The SDP came 1500 votes from winning in 1987 under Malcolm Dean. In 1992, Conservative Chris Patten was ousted by Liberal Democrat Don Foster in a narrow defeat widely blamed on Patten's strategising, campaign leading and communicating as Conservative Party chairman rather than canvassing his own constituents. At each election from 1992 to 2015, a different Conservative candidate contested the constituency.

The boundary changes implemented in 1997 took Bathampton, Batheaston, Bathford, Charlcombe and Freshford from the Wansdyke district, containing about 7,000 voters; these were moved elsewhere in 2010. Nominally, these areas had a slightly higher tendency to prefer a Conservative candidate but, the national government suffering from sleaze, in 1997 Don Foster more than doubled his almost 4,000 vote majority to over 9,000 votes. After winning two intervening elections, in 2010 Foster achieved his highest majority of 11,883 votes.

In the 2015 general election, following the national Liberal Democrat collapse and Foster standing down, the seat was regained by the Conservatives under Ben Howlett with a 3,833-vote majority.

Bath is estimated to have voted to remain in the European Union by 68.3% in the 2016 referendum on the UK's membership of the EU.

In the 2017 general election, the constituency was regained by the Liberal Democrats' Wera Hobhouse, with the second-highest Liberal Democrat vote share increase nationally (after Richmond Park).

In the 2019 general election, the constituency was one of 60 seats included in an agreement between the Liberal Democrats, the Green Party and Plaid Cymru not to vie against one another in those seats (Unite to Remain). Accordingly, the Green Party did not stand and Hobhouse increased her majority to 23.6%.

In December 2023, the Labour Party included the seat in its published list of 211 non-battleground seats, suggesting they did not see it as winnable.

In the 2024 general election, the Green Party stood again, achieving 12.4% of the vote, resulting in a similar drop in the Liberal Democrat vote. However, Hobhouse's majority was maintained as the Conservative vote collapsed with Labour in second place.

== Boundaries ==
=== Historic boundaries ===
- Before 1832: The parishes of St James (Bath), St Peter and St Paul (Bath), and St Michael (Bath), and part of the parish of Walcot
- 1832–1867: As above, plus the parishes of Bathwick and Lyncombe & Widcombe, and a further part of the parish of Walcot
- 1867–1918: As above, plus part of the parish of Twerton
- 1918–1983: The county borough of Bath (boundary changes in 1955)
- 1983–1997: The City of Bath (no boundary changes)
- 1997–2010: The City of Bath, and the District of Wansdyke wards of Bathampton, Batheaston, Bathford, Charlcombe, and Freshford
- 2010–2024: The City of Bath (see below)

=== 2010–2024 ===
Map of boundaries 2010–2024

Following the review of the constituencies in the former county of Avon carried out by the Boundary Commission for England, as of the 2010 general election the constituency covered only the city of Bath, and none of the surrounding rural area. Between 1997 and 2010, it had been designated as a county constituency as it also included some outlying villages such as Southstoke and Freshford which were now transferred to the North East Somerset constituency. The changes in 2010 resulted in Bath becoming a borough constituency once again. With its 2010 boundaries, Bath was one of only two UK Parliament constituencies to be surrounded by another constituency, being encircled by North East Somerset; the other constituency, York Central, was entirely surrounded by York Outer.

The 2010 constituency's electoral wards were defined as: (Note: These form the City of Bath in Bath and North East Somerset)

- Abbey, Bathwick, Combe Down, Kingsmead, Lambridge, Lansdown, Lyncombe, Newbridge, Odd Down, Oldfield, Southdown, Twerton, Walcot, Westmoreland, Weston and Widcombe.

In 2019, taking effect at that year's local elections, boundary changes to the wards took place, which included the abolition of Abbey ward, the merger of Lyncombe and Widcombe wards, the creation of Moorlands ward, and the replacement of Oldfield with Oldfield Park. These ward changes did not change the parliamentary constituency boundary.

=== 2024–present ===
Map of boundaries from 2024

Following the 2023 periodic review of Westminster constituencies, the composition of the constituency from the 2024 general election was expanded to bring the electorate within the permitted range by transferring the Bathavon North ward, as well as the parishes of Kelston and North Stoke (part of the redrawn Newbridge ward), from North East Somerset. The boundaries are now similar to those of 1983–1997 and the status of the seat has been changed back to a county constituency.

The current boundaries therefore now comprise the following wards of the District of Bath and North East Somerset:

- Bathavon North; Bathwick; Combe Down; Kingsmead; Lambridge; Lansdown; Moorlands; Newbridge; Odd Down; Oldfield Park; Southdown; Twerton; Walcot; Westmoreland; Weston; Widcombe & Lyncombe.

== Members of Parliament ==
The current Member of Parliament is Wera Hobhouse of the Liberal Democrats.

From 30 July to 4 August 1766, Bath was the constituency of the prime minister: William Pitt the Elder represented the constituency until he was raised to the peerage as Earl of Chatham shortly after becoming prime minister.

=== Members of Parliament 1295–1640 ===
- Constituency created (1295)

Parliament	First member	Second member
1386	Sewal Fraunceys	John Honybrigge
1388 (February)	John Palmer	Edmund Ford
1388 (September)	William Shropshire	Roger Skinner
1390 (January)	Richard Clewer	William Rous
1390 (November)		
1391	Hugh de la Lynde	Nicholas Sambourne I
1393	Hugh de la Lynde	Thomas Ryton
1394	John Touprest	John Marsh I
1395	Robert Draper	John Marsh I
1397 (January)	Robert Aunger	John Marsh I
1397 (September)	Hugh de la Lynde	John Chaunceys
1399	John Chaunceys	John Whittocksmead
1401		
1402	John Whittocksmead	John Haygoby
1404 (January)		
1404 (October)		
1406	Thomas Rymour	Henry Bartlett
1407	Henry Bartlett	John Whittocksmead
1410	Henry Bartlett	John Whittocksmead
1411		
1413 (February)		
1413 (May)	Richard Widcombe	Roger Hobbes
1414 (April)	John Marsh II	Walter Rich
1414 (November)	Richard Widcombe	William Radstock
1415		
1416 (March)	William Chapman	
1416 (October)		
1417	Ralph Hunt	Walter Rich
1419	Richard Widcombe	John Marsh II
1420	Richard Widcombe	William Philips
1421 (May)	Richard Widcombe	John Marsh II
1421 (December)	Walter Rich	Robert Newlyn
1510–1523	No names known	
1529	John Bird	Thomas Welpley
1536	?	
1539	John Reynold	John Clement
1542	?	
1545	Matthew Colthurst	Silvester Sedborough
1547	Richard Denys	John Clerke
1553 (March)	?	
1553 (October)	Richard Chapman	Edward Ludwell
1554 (April)	William Crowche	Edward Ludwell
1554 (November)	John Story	William Crowche
1555	?Henry Hodgkins	?
1558	Edward Ludwell	John Bale
1558–59	Edward St Loe	William Robinson
1562–63	Edward Ludwell, died and replaced 1566 by John Gwynne	Thomas Turner
1571	Edward Baber	George Pearman
1572	George Pearman	Edward Baber
1584	Thomas Ayshe	William Shareston
1586	Thomas Ayshe	William Shareston
1588	John Court	John Walley
1593	William Shareston	William Price
1597	William Shareston	William Heath
1601	William Shareston	William Heath
1604–1611	William Shareston	Christopher Stone
1614	Sir James Ley	Nicholas Hyde
1621–1622	Sir Robert Phelips	Sir Robert Pye
1624	Sir Robert Pye	John Malet
1625	Nicholas Hyde sat for Bristol replaced by Ralph Hopton	Edward Hungerford
1626	Richard Gay	William Chapman
1628–1629	John Popham	Sir Walter Long
1629–1640	No Parliaments summoned	

=== Members of Parliament 1640–1918 ===
Year	First member	First party	Second member	Second party
April 1640	Sir Charles Berkeley		Alexander Popham	
November 1640	William Bassett	Royalist	Alexander Popham	Parliamentarian
February 1642	Bassett disabled from sitting – seat vacant		Alexander Popham	Parliamentarian
1645	James Ashe		Alexander Popham	Parliamentarian
1653	Bath was unrepresented in the Barebones Parliament			
1654	Alexander Popham		Bath had only one seat in the First and Second Parliaments of the Protectorate	
1656	James Ashe		Bath had only one seat in the First and Second Parliaments of the Protectorate	
January 1659	James Ashe		John Harrington	
May 1659	James Ashe		One seat vacant	
March 1660	Alexander Popham		William Prynne	
November 1669	Alexander Popham		Sir Francis Popham	
November 1669	Sir William Bassett		Sir Francis Popham	
1675	Sir William Bassett		Sir George Speke	
1679	Sir Walter Long		Sir George Speke	
1681	Viscount Fitzhardinge		Sir William Bassett	
1690	Joseph Langton		Sir William Bassett	
1693	Joseph Langton		William Blathwayt	Whig
1695	Sir Thomas Estcourt		William Blathwayt	Whig
1698	Alexander Popham		William Blathwayt	Whig
1707	Samuel Trotman		William Blathwayt	Whig
1710	Samuel Trotman		John Codrington	
1720	Robert Gay		John Codrington	
1722	General George Wade		John Codrington	
1727	General George Wade		Robert Gay	
1734	General George Wade		John Codrington	
1741	General George Wade		Philip Bennet	
1747	General George Wade		Robert Henley	
1748	General Sir John Ligonier		Robert Henley	
1757	General Sir John Ligonier		William Pitt the Elder	Whig
1763	Major-General Sir John Sebright	Whig	William Pitt the Elder	Whig
1766	Major-General Sir John Sebright	Whig	John Smith	Tory
1774	Abel Moysey	Tory	John Smith	Tory
1775	Abel Moysey	Tory	Lieutenant-General Sir John Sebright	Whig
1780	Abel Moysey	Tory	Hon. John Pratt	Tory
1790	Viscount Weymouth	Tory	Hon. John Pratt	Tory
1794	Viscount Weymouth	Tory	Sir Richard Pepper Arden	Tory
1796	Lord John Thynne	Tory	Sir Richard Pepper Arden	Tory
1801	Lord John Thynne	Tory	John Palmer	Whig
1808	Lord John Thynne	Tory	Charles Palmer	Whig
1826	Lord John Thynne	Tory	Earl of Brecknock	Tory
1830	Lord John Thynne	Tory	Charles Palmer	Whig
1832	John Arthur Roebuck	Radical	Charles Palmer	Whig
1837	Viscount Powerscourt	Conservative	William Heald Ludlow Bruges	Conservative
1841	Viscount Duncan	Whig	John Arthur Roebuck	Radical
1847	Viscount Duncan	Whig	Lord Ashley	Conservative
1851	Viscount Duncan	Whig	George Treweeke Scobell	Whig
1852	Thomas Phinn	Whig	George Treweeke Scobell	Whig
1855	William Tite	Whig	George Treweeke Scobell	Whig
1857	William Tite	Whig	Sir Arthur Elton	Whig
1859	William Tite	Liberal	Arthur Edwin Way	Conservative
1865	William Tite	Liberal	James McGarel-Hogg	Conservative
1868	William Tite	Liberal	Donald Dalrymple	Liberal
May 1873	Viscount Chelsea	Conservative	Donald Dalrymple	Liberal
June 1873	Viscount Grey de Wilton	Conservative	Donald Dalrymple	Liberal
October 1873	Viscount Grey de Wilton	Conservative	Arthur Hayter	Liberal
1874	Nathaniel Bousfield	Conservative	Arthur Hayter	Liberal
1880	Edmond Wodehouse	Liberal	Arthur Hayter	Liberal
1885	Edmond Wodehouse	Liberal	Robert Stickney Blaine	Conservative
1886	Edmond Wodehouse	Liberal Unionist	Colonel Robert Laurie	Conservative
1892	Edmond Wodehouse	Liberal Unionist	Wyndham Murray	Conservative
1906	Donald Maclean	Liberal	George Peabody Gooch	Liberal
1910	Lord Alexander Thynne	Conservative	Sir Charles Hunter	Conservative
1918	Representation reduced to one Member			

=== Members of Parliament since 1918 ===
Election	Member	Party
1918	Charles Foxcroft	Unionist
1923	Frank Raffety	Liberal
1924	Charles Foxcroft	Unionist
1929 by-election	Charles Baillie-Hamilton	Unionist
1931	Loel Guinness	Conservative
1945	James Pitman	Conservative
1964	Sir Edward Brown	Conservative
1979	Chris Patten	Conservative
1992	Don Foster	Liberal Democrat
2015	Ben Howlett	Conservative
2017	Wera Hobhouse	Liberal Democrat

== Elections ==
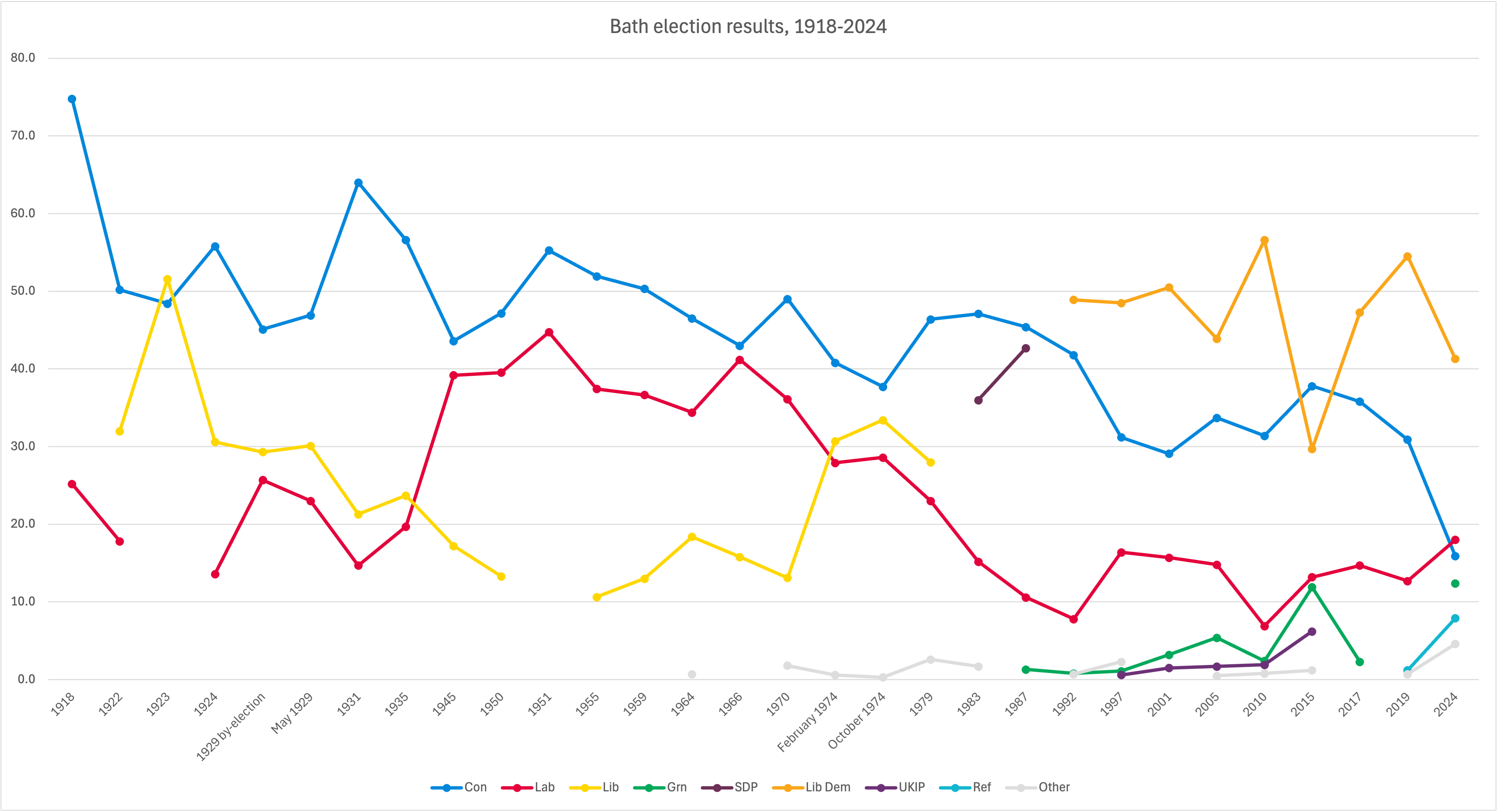
Bath election results

=== Elections in the 2020s ===
General election 2024: Bath
Party	Candidate	Votes	%	±%
Liberal Democrats	Wera Hobhouse	19,883	41.3	−12.1
Labour	Dan Bewley	8,665	18.0	+5.5
Conservative	James Wright	7,659	15.9	−16.2
Green	Dominic Tristram	5,952	12.4	+12.1
Reform	Teresa Hall	3,798	7.9	+6.8
Independent	Colin David Blackburn	1,749	3.6	N/A
Workers Party	Matthew Alford	230	0.5	N/A
Independent	Bill Blockhead	169	0.4	−0.2
Independent	A.N.ON	25	0.1	N/A
Majority		11,218	23.3	−0.3
Turnout		48,130	69.1	−8.6
Registered electors		69,655		
Liberal Democrats hold		Swing	−8.8	

=== Elections in the 2010s ===
2019 notional result
Party	Vote	%
Liberal Democrats	30,376	53.4
Conservative	18,251	32.1
Labour	7,120	12.5
Brexit Party	642	1.1
Others	341	0.6
Green	146	0.3
Turnout	56,876	77.7
Electorate	73,241	

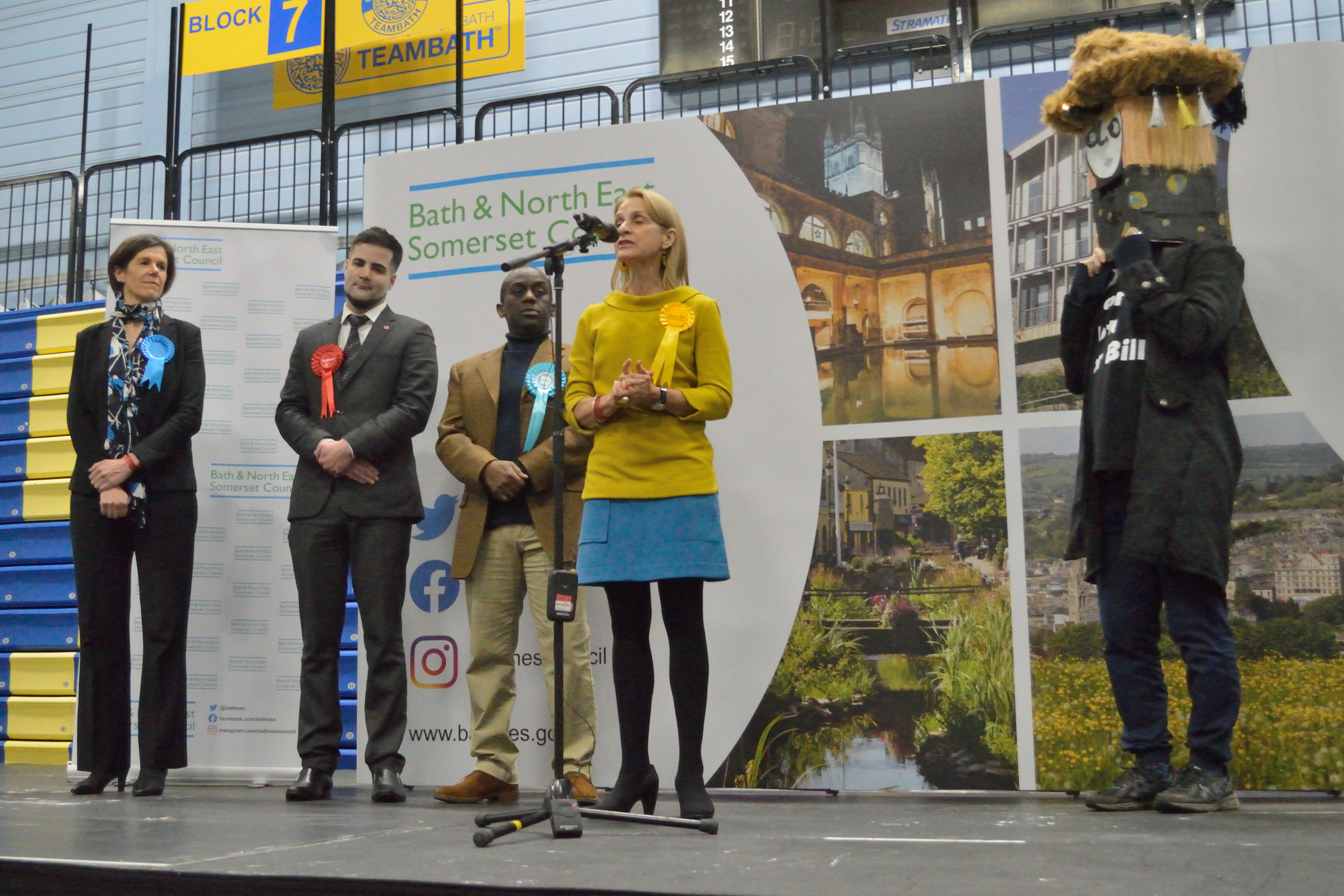
Candidates at the Bath 2019 general election declaration

General election 2019: Bath
Party	Candidate	Votes	%	±%
Liberal Democrats	Wera Hobhouse	28,419	54.5	+7.2
Conservative	Annabel Tall	16,097	30.9	−4.9
Labour	Mike Davies	6,639	12.7	−2.0
Brexit Party	Jimi Ogunnusi	642	1.2	N/A
Independent	Bill Blockhead	341	0.7	N/A
Majority		12,322	23.6	+12.1
Turnout		52,138	76.9	+2.6
Liberal Democrats hold		Swing	+6.0	

General election 2017: Bath
Party	Candidate	Votes	%	±%
Liberal Democrats	Wera Hobhouse	23,436	47.3	+17.6
Conservative	Ben Howlett	17,742	35.8	−2.0
Labour	Joe Rayment	7,279	14.7	+1.5
Green	Eleanor Field	1,125	2.3	−9.6
Majority		5,694	11.5	N/A
Turnout		49,582	74.3	−1.2
Liberal Democrats gain from Conservative		Swing	+9.8	

General election 2015: Bath
Party	Candidate	Votes	%	±%
Conservative	Ben Howlett	17,833	37.8	+6.4
Liberal Democrats	Steve Bradley	14,000	29.7	−26.9
Labour	Ollie Middleton	6,216	13.2	+6.3
Green	Dominic Tristram	5,634	11.9	+9.5
UKIP	Julian Deverell	2,922	6.2	+4.3
Independent	Loraine Morgan-Brinkhurst	499	1.1	N/A
English Democrat	Jenny Knight	63	0.1	N/A
Majority		3,833	8.1	N/A
Turnout		47,167	77.5	+5.7
Conservative gain from Liberal Democrats		Swing	+16.7	

General election 2010: Bath
Party	Candidate	Votes	%	±%
Liberal Democrats	Don Foster	26,651	56.6	+11.2
Conservative	Fabian Richter	14,768	31.4	−0.5
Labour	Hattie Ajderian	3,251	6.9	−7.5
Green	Eric Lucas	1,120	2.4	−3.6
UKIP	Ernie Warrender	890	1.9	+0.2
Christian	Steve Hewett	250	0.5	N/A
Independent	A.N.ON	69	0.1	N/A
Independent	Sean Geddis	56	0.1	N/A
All The South Party	Robert Craig	31	0.1	N/A
Majority		11,883	25.2	+15.1
Turnout		47,086	71.8	+2.7
Liberal Democrats hold		Swing	+5.8	

=== Elections in the 2000s ===
General election 2005: Bath
Party	Candidate	Votes	%	±%
Liberal Democrats	Don Foster	20,101	43.9	−6.6
Conservative	Sian Dawson	15,463	33.7	+4.6
Labour	Hattie Ajderian	6,773	14.8	−0.9
Green	Eric Lucas	2,494	5.4	+2.2
UKIP	Richard Crowder	770	1.7	+0.2
Independent	Patrick Cobbe	177	0.4	N/A
Independent	Graham Walker	58	0.1	N/A
Majority		4,638	10.2	−11.2
Turnout		45,836	68.6	+3.7
Liberal Democrats hold		Swing	−5.6	

General election 2001: Bath
Party	Candidate	Votes	%	±%
Liberal Democrats	Don Foster	23,372	50.5	+2.0
Conservative	Ashley Fox	13,478	29.1	−2.1
Labour	Marilyn Hawkings	7,269	15.7	−0.7
Green	Michael Boulton	1,469	3.2	+2.1
UKIP	Andrew Tettenborn	708	1.5	+0.9
Majority		9,894	21.4	+4.1
Turnout		46,296	64.9	−11.3
Liberal Democrats hold		Swing	+2.1	

=== Elections in the 1990s ===
General election 1997: Bath
Party	Candidate	Votes	%	±%
Liberal Democrats	Don Foster	26,169	48.5	−0.4
Conservative	Alison McNair	16,850	31.2	−9.4
Labour	Tim Bush	8,828	16.4	+8.6
Referendum	Tony Cook	1,192	2.2	N/A
Green	Richard Scrase	580	1.1	+0.3
UKIP	Peter Sandell	315	0.6	N/A
Natural Law	Nicholas Pullen	55	0.1	N/A
Majority		9,319	17.3	+10.2
Turnout		53,989	76.2	−9.2
Liberal Democrats hold		Swing	+4.9	

General election 1992: Bath
Party	Candidate	Votes	%	±%
Liberal Democrats	Don Foster	25,718	48.9	+6.2
Conservative	Chris Patten	21,950	41.8	−3.6
Labour	Pamela Richards	4,102	7.8	−2.8
Green	Duncan McCanlis	433	0.8	−0.5
Liberal	May Barker	172	0.3	N/A
Anti-Federalist League	Alan Sked	117	0.2	N/A
Independent	John Rumming	79	0.2	N/A
Majority		3,768	7.1	N/A
Turnout		52,571	82.4	+3.0
Liberal Democrats gain from Conservative		Swing	+4.9	

=== Elections in the 1980s ===
General election 1987: Bath
Party	Candidate	Votes	%	±%
Conservative	Chris Patten	23,515	45.4	−1.7
SDP	Malcolm Dean	22,103	42.7	+6.7
Labour	Jenny Smith	5,507	10.6	−4.6
Green	Derek Wall	687	1.3	+0.4
Majority		1,412	2.7	−8.4
Turnout		51,812	79.4	+5.0
Conservative hold		Swing	−4.2	

General election 1983: Bath
Party	Candidate	Votes	%	±%
Conservative	Chris Patten	22,544	47.1	+0.7
SDP	Malcolm Dean	17,240	36.0	+8.0
Labour	Adrian Pott	7,259	15.2	−7.8
Ecology	Don Grimes	441	0.9	−1.3
Progressive Liberal	R. S. Wandle	319	0.7	N/A
World Government	Gilbert Young	67	0.1	N/A
Majority		5,304	11.1	−7.3
Turnout		47,870	74.4	−3.7
Conservative hold		Swing	−4.4	

=== Elections in the 1970s ===
General election 1979: Bath
Party	Candidate	Votes	%	±%
Conservative	Chris Patten	23,025	46.4	+8.7
Liberal	Christopher Mayhew	13,913	28.0	−5.4
Labour	M. Baber	11,407	23.0	−5.6
Ecology	Don Grimes	1,082	2.2	N/A
National Front	Thomas Mundy	206	0.4	N/A
Majority		9,112	18.4	+14.1
Turnout		49,633	78.1	−0.5
Conservative hold		Swing	+7.0	

General election October 1974: Bath
Party	Candidate	Votes	%	±%
Conservative	Edward Brown	18,470	37.7	−3.1
Liberal	Christopher Mayhew	16,348	33.4	+2.7
Labour	Malcolm Bishop	14,011	28.6	+0.7
United Democratic	John Vernon Kemp	150	0.3	N/A
Majority		2,122	4.3	−5.8
Turnout		48,979	78.6	−4.4
Conservative hold		Swing	−2.9	

General election February 1974: Bath
Party	Candidate	Votes	%	±%
Conservative	Edward Brown	20,920	40.8	−8.2
Liberal	Peter Downey	15,738	30.7	+17.6
Labour	Malcolm Bishop	14,396	27.9	−8.2
Ind. Conservative	H. B. de Laterriere	204	0.4	N/A
World Government	Gilbert Young	118	0.2	−1.6
Majority		5,182	10.1	−2.8
Turnout		51,376	83.0	+5.9
Conservative hold		Swing	−12.9	

General election 1970: Bath
Party	Candidate	Votes	%	±%
Conservative	Edward Brown	22,344	49.0	+6.0
Labour	David Young	16,493	36.1	−5.1
Liberal	Roger H. Crowther	5,957	13.1	−2.7
World Government	Gilbert Young	840	1.8	N/A
Majority		5,851	12.9	+11.1
Turnout		45,634	77.1	−3.4
Conservative hold		Swing	+5.5	

=== Elections in the 1960s ===
General election 1966: Bath
Party	Candidate	Votes	%	±%
Conservative	Edward Brown	19,344	43.0	−3.5
Labour	Frederick S. Moorhouse	18,544	41.2	+6.8
Liberal	Roger H. Crowther	7,095	15.8	−2.6
Majority		800	1.8	−10.3
Turnout		44,983	80.5	−3.7
Conservative hold		Swing		

General election 1964: Bath
Party	Candidate	Votes	%	±%
Conservative	Edward Brown	22,255	46.5	−3.8
Labour	Frederick S. Moorhouse	16,464	34.4	−2.3
Liberal	Brian R. Pamplin	8,795	18.4	+5.4
World Government	Gilbert Young	318	0.7	N/A
Majority		5,791	12.1	−1.6
Turnout		45,832	84.2	+0.6
Conservative hold		Swing		

=== Elections in the 1950s ===
General election 1959: Bath
Party	Candidate	Votes	%	±%
Conservative	James Pitman	24,048	50.33	
Labour	George E Mayer	17,515	36.66	
Liberal	George Allen	6,214	13.01	
Majority		6,533	13.67	
Turnout		47,777	83.60	
Conservative hold		Swing		

General election 1955: Bath
Party	Candidate	Votes	%	±%
Conservative	James Pitman	24,489	51.94	
Labour Co-op	Thomas W Richardson	17,646	37.43	
Liberal	Barbara Burwell	5,011	10.63	N/A
Majority		6,843	14.51	
Turnout		47,146	82.46	
Conservative hold		Swing		

General election 1951: Bath
Party	Candidate	Votes	%	±%
Conservative	James Pitman	27,826	55.26	
Labour	Victor Mishcon	22,530	44.74	
Majority		5,296	10.52	
Turnout		50,356	85.64	
Conservative hold		Swing		

General election 1950: Bath
Party	Candidate	Votes	%	±%
Conservative	James Pitman	23,070	47.16	
Labour	Hugh Bruce Oliphant Cardew	19,340	39.54	
Liberal	Philip William Hopkins	6,508	13.30	
Majority		3,730	7.62	
Turnout		48,918	87.28	
Conservative hold		Swing		

=== Elections in the 1940s ===
General election 1945: Bath
Party	Candidate	Votes	%	±%
Conservative	James Pitman	20,196	43.6	−13.0
Labour	Dorothy Archibald	18,120	39.2	+19.5
Liberal	Philip William Hopkins	7,952	17.2	−6.5
Majority		2,076	4.4	−28.5
Turnout		46,268		
Conservative hold		Swing		

=== Election in the 1930s ===
General Election 1939–40:

Another General Election was required to take place before the end of 1940. The political parties had been making preparations for an election to take place and by the Autumn of 1939, the following candidates had been selected;

- Conservative: Lord Ronaldshay
- Liberal: Philip William Hopkins
- Labour: George Gilbert Desmond
- A minority of Bath Conservatives, led by the town Mayor, Adrian Hopkins objected to Ronaldshay who had no link with the town. Hopkins was considering running as an independent. Desmond was under pressure to withdraw in favour of the Liberal candidate fighting on a Popular Front programme

General election 14 November 1935: Bath
Party	Candidate	Votes	%	±%
Conservative	Loel Guinness	20,670	56.6	−7.4
Liberal	Sidney Reginald Daniels	8,650	23.7	+2.4
Labour	George Gilbert Desmond	7,185	19.7	+5.0
Majority		12,020	32.9	−9.8
Turnout		36,505	74.5	−6.1
Conservative hold		Swing	−4.7	

General election 27 October 1931: Bath
Party	Candidate	Votes	%	±%
Conservative	Loel Guinness	24,696	64.0	+17.1
Liberal	Sidney Reginald Daniels	8,241	21.3	−8.8
Labour	George Gilbert Desmond	5,680	14.7	−8.3
Majority		16,455	42.7	+25.9
Turnout		38,617	80.6	−0.7
Conservative hold		Swing	+12.9	

=== Election in the 1920s ===
General election 30 May 1929: Bath
Party	Candidate	Votes	%	±%
Unionist	Charles Baillie-Hamilton	17,845	46.9	−8.9
Liberal	Sidney Reginald Daniels	11,485	30.1	−0.5
Labour	George Gilbert Desmond	8,769	23.0	+9.4
Majority		6,360	16.8	−8.4
Turnout		38,099	81.3	−3.2
Unionist hold		Swing	+0.5	

1929 Bath by-election
Party	Candidate	Votes	%	±%
Unionist	Charles Baillie-Hamilton	11,171	45.1	−10.7
Liberal	Sidney Reginald Daniels	7,255	29.3	−1.3
Labour	George Gilbert Desmond	6,359	25.7	+12.1
Majority		3,916	15.8	−9.4
Turnout		24,785	72.8	−11.7
Unionist hold		Swing	−4.6	

General election 29 October 1924: Bath
Party	Candidate	Votes	%	±%
Unionist	Charles Foxcroft	16,067	55.8	+7.4
Liberal	Frank Raffety	8,800	30.6	−21.0
Labour	Walter Barton Scobell	3,914	13.6	N/A
Majority		7,267	25.2	N/A
Turnout		28,771	84.5	+5.4
Unionist gain from Liberal		Swing	+14.2	

General election 6 December 1923: Bath
Party	Candidate	Votes	%	±%
Liberal	Frank Raffety	13,694	51.6	+19.6
Unionist	Charles Foxcroft	12,830	48.4	−1.8
Majority		864	3.2	N/A
Turnout		26,524	79.1	−3.3
Liberal gain from Unionist		Swing	+10.7	

E.H. Spender

General election 15 November 1922: Bath
Party	Candidate	Votes	%	±%
Unionist	Charles Foxcroft	13,666	50.2	−24.6
Liberal	Harold Spender	8,699	32.0	N/A
Labour	Herbert Elvin	4,849	17.8	−7.4
Majority		4,967	18.2	−31.4
Turnout		27,214	82.4	+16.2
Unionist hold		Swing		

=== Election in the 1910s ===
General election 1918: Bath
Party		Candidate	Votes	%	±%
C	Unionist	Charles Foxcroft	15,605	74.8	
	Labour	Alfred James Bethell	5,244	25.2	N/A
Majority			10,361	49.6	
Turnout			20,849	66.2	
Registered electors			31,512		
	Unionist hold		Swing		
C indicates candidate endorsed by the coalition government.

General Election 1914–15:

Another General Election was required to take place before the end of 1915. The political parties had been making preparations for an election to take place and by July 1914, the following candidates had been selected;

- Unionist: Charles Hunter, Lord Alexander Thynne
- Liberal: Harry Geen, J.C. Meggott

Hardy

General election December 1910: Bath
Party	Candidate	Votes	%	±%
Conservative	Lord Alexander Thynne	3,875	26.0	+0.2
Conservative	Charles Hunter	3,841	25.7	+0.4
Liberal	George Peabody Gooch	3,631	24.3	−0.2
Liberal	George Hardy	3,585	24.0	−0.4
Majority		210	1.4	+0.6
Turnout		14,932	92.0	−2.7
Registered electors		8,144		
Conservative hold		Swing	+0.2	
Conservative hold		Swing	+0.4	

Gooch

General election January 1910: Bath
Party	Candidate	Votes	%	±%
Conservative	Lord Alexander Thynne	3,961	25.8	+4.1
Conservative	Charles Hunter	3,889	25.3	+3.8
Liberal	Donald Maclean	3,771	24.5	−4.0
Liberal	George Peabody Gooch	3,757	24.4	−3.9
Majority		118	0.8	N/A
Turnout		15,378	94.7	+3.9
Registered electors		8,144		
Conservative gain from Liberal		Swing	+2.1	
Conservative gain from Liberal		Swing	+3.9	

=== Elections in the 1900s ===
Maclean

General election 1906: Bath
Party	Candidate	Votes	%	±%
Liberal	Donald Maclean	4,102	28.5	+6.9
Liberal	George Peabody Gooch	4,069	28.3	+7.2
Conservative	Lord Alexander Thynne	3,123	21.7	−6.8
Conservative	Wyndham Murray	3,088	21.5	−7.3
Majority		946	6.6	N/A
Turnout		14,382	90.8	+7.3
Registered electors		7,968		
Liberal gain from Conservative		Swing	+6.9	
Liberal gain from Liberal Unionist		Swing	+7.3	

Murray

General election 1900: Bath
Party	Candidate	Votes	%	±%
Conservative	Wyndham Murray	3,486	28.8	+1.5
Liberal Unionist	Edmond Wodehouse	3,439	28.5	+1.8
Liberal	Donald Maclean	2,605	21.6	−1.6
Liberal	Alpheus Morton	2,549	21.1	−1.7
Turnout		12,079	83.5	−6.2
Registered electors		7,300		
Majority		881	7.2	+3.1
Conservative hold		Swing	+1.6	
Majority		834	6.9	+3.4
Liberal Unionist hold		Swing	+1.8	

=== Elections in the 1890s ===
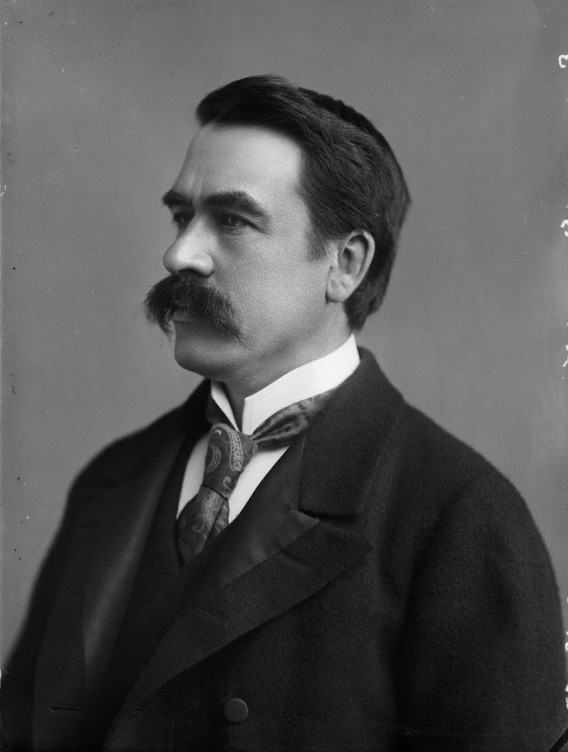
Conway

Fuller

General election 1895: Bath (2 seats)
Party	Candidate	Votes	%	±%
Conservative	Wyndham Murray	3,445	27.3	+1.2
Liberal Unionist	Edmond Wodehouse	3,358	26.7	+0.9
Liberal	Martin Conway	2,917	23.2	−1.0
Liberal	John Fuller	2,865	22.8	−1.1
Turnout		12,585	89.7	+0.4
Registered electors		7,059		
Majority		528	4.1	+2.2
Conservative hold		Swing	+1.1	
Majority		441	3.5	+1.9
Liberal Unionist hold		Swing	+1.0	

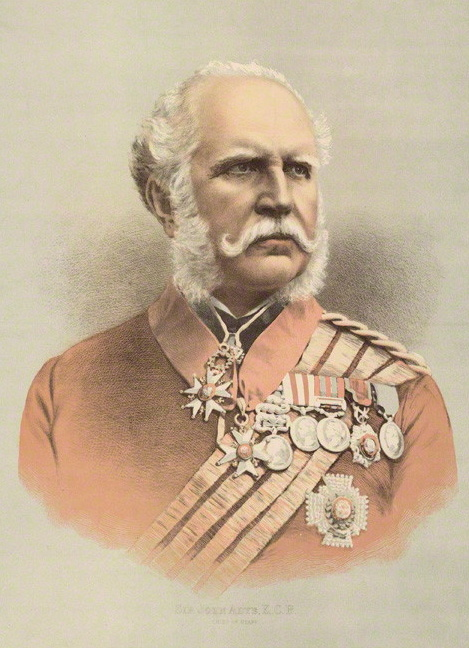
Adye

General election 1892: Bath (2 seats)
Party	Candidate	Votes	%	±%
Conservative	Wyndham Murray	3,198	26.1	−1.7
Liberal Unionist	Edmond Wodehouse	3,177	25.8	−2.5
Liberal	Thomas P Baptie	2,981	24.2	+2.0
Liberal	John Miller Adye	2,941	23.9	+2.2
Turnout		12,297	89.3	+0.9
Registered electors		6,922		
Majority		217	1.9	−3.7
Conservative hold		Swing	−1.9	
Majority		196	1.6	−4.5
Liberal Unionist hold		Swing	−2.3	

=== Elections in the 1880s ===
Verney

Murray

General election 1886: Bath (2 seats)
Party	Candidate	Votes	%	±%
Liberal Unionist	Edmond Wodehouse	3,309	28.3	+1.9
Conservative	Robert Peter Laurie	3,244	27.8	+3.3
Liberal	Arthur Hayter	2,588	22.2	−2.2
Liberal	Frederick Verney	2,529	21.7	−2.8
Turnout		5,870	88.4	−3.5
Registered electors		6,637		
Majority		721	6.1	N/A
Liberal Unionist gain from Liberal		Swing	+2.1	
Majority		656	5.6	+4.1
Conservative hold		Swing	+3.1	

Wodehouse

Hayter

General election 1885: Bath (2 seats)
Party	Candidate	Votes	%	±%
Conservative	Robert Stickney Blaine	3,208	26.4	+2.8
Liberal	Edmond Wodehouse	2,990	24.7	−2.3
Conservative	Robert Peter Laurie	2,971	24.5	+2.1
Liberal	Arthur Hayter	2,953	24.4	−2.7
Turnout		6,099	91.9	+1.4 (est)
Registered electors		6,637		
Majority		255	2.0	N/A
Conservative gain from Liberal		Swing	+2.8	
Majority		19	0.2	−3.2
Liberal hold		Swing	−2.2	

By-election, 8 May 1880: Bath (1 seat)
Party	Candidate	Votes	%	±%
Liberal	Arthur Hayter	Unopposed		
Liberal hold				

- Caused by Hayter's appointment as a Lord Commissioner of the Treasury.

General election 1880: Bath (2 seats)
Party	Candidate	Votes	%	±%
Liberal	Arthur Hayter	2,712	27.1	+1.0
Liberal	Edmond Wodehouse	2,700	27.0	+2.2
Conservative	Reginald Hardy	2,359	23.6	−1.2
Conservative	Thomas James Smyth	2,241	22.4	−1.9
Majority		341	3.4	N/A
Turnout		5,006 (est)	90.5 (est)	+2.0
Registered electors		5,534		
Liberal hold		Swing	+1.1	
Liberal gain from Conservative		Swing	+2.1	

=== Elections in the 1870s ===
General election 1874: Bath (2 seats)
Party	Candidate	Votes	%	±%
Liberal	Arthur Hayter	2,520	26.1	−10.9
Conservative	Nathaniel Bousfield	2,397	24.8	+9.6
Liberal	John William Nicholas Hervey	2,391	24.8	−7.9
Conservative	Arthur Egerton	2,348	24.3	+9.1
Turnout		4,828 (est)	88.5 (est)	+1.8
Registered electors		5,454		
Majority		123	1.3	−1.1
Liberal hold		Swing	−10.0	
Majority		6	0.0	N/A
Conservative gain from Liberal		Swing	+8.7	

By-election, 9 Oct 1873: Bath (1 seat)
Party	Candidate	Votes	%	±%
Liberal	Arthur Hayter	2,210	50.9	−18.8
Conservative	William Forsyth	2,071	47.7	+17.4
Independent Liberal	Charles Thompson	57	1.3	N/A
Majority		139	3.2	+0.8
Turnout		4,338	83.7	−3.0
Registered electors		5,182		
Liberal hold		Swing	−18.1	

- Caused by Dalrymple's death.

By-election, 27 June 1873: Bath (1 seat)
Party	Candidate	Votes	%	±%
Conservative	Arthur Egerton	2,194	50.4	+20.1
Liberal	Arthur Hayter	2,143	49.2	−20.5
Independent Liberal	John Charles Cox	15	0.3	N/A
Majority		51	1.2	N/A
Turnout		4,352	84.0	−2.7
Registered electors		5,182		
Conservative gain from Liberal		Swing	+20.3	

- Caused by Cadogan's elevation to the peerage, becoming Earl Cadogan.

By-election, 7 May 1873: Bath (1 seat)
Party	Candidate	Votes	%	±%
Conservative	Viscount Chelsea	2,251	53.1	+22.8
Liberal	Jerom Murch	1,991	46.9	−22.8
Majority		260	6.2	N/A
Turnout		4,242	81.9	−4.8
Registered electors		5,182		
Conservative gain from Liberal		Swing	+22.8	

- Caused by Tite's death.

=== Elections in the 1860s ===
General election 1868: Bath (2 seats)
Party	Candidate	Votes	%	±%
Liberal	William Tite	2,478	37.0	N/A
Liberal	Donald Dalrymple	2,187	32.7	N/A
Conservative	James Hogg	2,024	30.3	N/A
Majority		163	2.4	N/A
Turnout		4,357 (est)	86.7 (est)	N/A
Registered electors		5,024		
Liberal hold		Swing	N/A	
Liberal gain from Conservative		Swing		

General election 1865: Bath (2 seats)
Party	Candidate	Votes	%	±%
Liberal	William Tite	Unopposed		
Conservative	James Hogg	Unopposed		
Registered electors		2,960		
Liberal hold				
Conservative hold				

=== Elections in the 1850s ===
General election 1859: Bath (2 seats)
Party	Candidate	Votes	%	±%
Liberal	William Tite	1,349	34.7	+1.7
Conservative	Arthur Edwin Way	1,339	34.5	+1.6
Liberal	Thomas Phinn	1,198	30.8	−3.3
Turnout		2,613 (est)	82.0 (est)	+5.1
Registered electors		3,185		
Majority		10	0.2	+0.1
Liberal hold		Swing	+0.5	
Majority		141	3.7	N/A
Conservative gain from Liberal		Swing	+1.2	

General election 1857: Bath (2 seats)
Party	Candidate	Votes	%	±%
Whig	Arthur Elton	1,243	34.1	−0.3
Whig	William Tite	1,200	33.0	−0.3
Conservative	Arthur Edwin Way	1,197	32.9	+0.6
Majority		3	0.1	−0.9
Turnout		2,419 (est)	76.9 (est)	−1.3
Registered electors		3,144		
Whig hold		Swing	−0.3	
Whig hold		Swing	−0.3	

By-election, 5 June 1855: Bath
Party	Candidate	Votes	%	±%
Whig	William Tite	1,176	51.0	−16.7
Peelite	William Whateley	1,129	49.0	+16.7
Majority		47	0.2	−0.8
Turnout		2,305	73.1	−5.1
Registered electors		3,155		
Whig hold		Swing	−16.7	

- Caused by Phinn's resignation after his appointment as Assistant Secretary to the Admiralty

General election 1852: Bath (2 seats)
Party	Candidate	Votes	%	±%
Whig	George Treweeke Scobell	1,332	34.4	+17.3
Whig	Thomas Phinn	1,290	33.3	+16.2
Peelite	William Whateley	1,253	32.3	−3.2
Majority		37	1.0	N/A
Turnout		2,564 (est)	78.2 (est)	−8.1
Registered electors		3,278		
Whig hold		Swing	+9.5	
Whig gain from Conservative		Swing	+8.9	

By-election, 25 June 1851: Bath
Party	Candidate	Votes	%	±%
Whig	George Treweeke Scobell	1,110	51.6	+17.5
Conservative	William Sutcliffe	1,041	48.4	+12.9
Majority		69	3.2	N/A
Turnout		2,151	68.7	−17.6
Registered electors		3,310		
Whig gain from Conservative		Swing	+2.3	

- Caused by Ashley-Cooper's succession to the peerage, becoming 7th Earl of Shaftesbury

=== Elections in the 1840s ===
General election 1847: Bath (2 seats)
Party	Candidate	Votes	%	±%
Conservative	Anthony Ashley-Cooper	1,278	35.5	−8.4
Whig	Adam Haldane-Duncan	1,228	34.1	+5.2
Radical	John Arthur Roebuck	1,093	30.4	+3.1
Turnout		2,439 (est)	86.3 (est)	+13.0
Registered electors		2,825		
Majority		185	5.1	N/A
Conservative gain from Radical		Swing	−6.8	
Majority		135	3.7	−3.3
Whig hold		Swing	+4.7	

General election 1841: Bath (2 seats)
Party	Candidate	Votes	%	±%
Whig	Adam Haldane-Duncan	1,223	28.9	+4.7
Radical	John Arthur Roebuck	1,157	27.3	+4.5
Conservative	William Heald Ludlow Bruges	930	22.0	−3.7
Conservative	Richard Wingfield	926	21.9	−5.4
Turnout		2,189	73.3	+4.3
Registered electors		2,985		
Majority		297	7.0	N/A
Whig gain from Conservative		Swing	+4.6	
Majority		227	5.3	N/A
Radical gain from Conservative		Swing	+4.5	

=== Elections in the 1830s ===
General election 1837: Bath (2 seats)
Party	Candidate	Votes	%	±%
Conservative	Richard Wingfield	1,087	27.3	+14.9
Conservative	William Heald Ludlow Bruges	1,024	25.7	+13.3
Whig	Charles Palmer	962	24.2	−14.4
Radical	John Arthur Roebuck	910	22.8	−13.8
Majority		125	3.1	N/A
Turnout		2,051	69.0	+4.7
Registered electors		2,973		
Conservative gain from Whig		Swing	+14.7	
Conservative gain from Radical		Swing	+13.6	

General election 1835: Bath (2 seats)
Party	Candidate	Votes	%	±%
Whig	Charles Palmer	1,097	38.6	−2.1
Radical	John Arthur Roebuck	1,042	36.6	+5.6
Conservative	Henry Daubeney	706	24.8	N/A
Turnout		1,776	64.3	−17.3
Registered electors		2,764		
Majority		55	2.0	−7.7
Whig hold		Swing	−3.9	
Majority		336	11.8	+9.1
Radical hold		Swing	+3.9	

General election 1832: Bath (2 seats)
Party	Candidate	Votes	%	±%
Whig	Charles Palmer	1,492	40.7	N/A
Radical	John Arthur Roebuck	1,138	31.0	N/A
Whig	Henry William Hobhouse	1,040	28.3	N/A
Turnout		2,329	81.6	N/A
Registered electors		2,853		
Majority		354	9.7	N/A
Whig hold		Swing	N/A	
Majority		98	2.7	N/A
Radical gain from Tory		Swing	N/A	

General election 1831: Bath (2 seats)
Party	Candidate	Votes	%	±%
Whig	Charles Palmer	Unopposed		
Tory	John Thynne	Unopposed		
Whig hold				
Tory hold				

General election 1830: Bath (2 seats)
Party	Candidate	Votes	%
Whig	Charles Palmer	Unopposed	
Tory	John Thynne	Unopposed	
Whig gain from Tory			
Tory hold			

== Sources ==
- "Parliamentary representation". Aspects of Somerset History. Archived from the original on 8 February 2005.
- "Bath". Vote 2005. BBC News.
- "Bath election history". Guardian Unlimited Politics. Archived from the original on 8 May 2005.
- "Bath and North-East Somerset". Boundary Commission for England. 1 January 2001. Archived from the original on 12 March 2005.
- "Constituencies in the unreformed House". Constituency start dates. Election Demon.
- The BBC/ITN Guide to the New Parliamentary Constituencies (Chichester: Parliamentary Research Services, 1983)
- Robert Beatson (1807). A Chronological Register of Both Houses of Parliament. London: Longman, Hurst, Res & Orme – via Internet Archive. "Return of Members of Parliament."
- D Brunton & DH Pennington, Members of the Long Parliament (London: George Allen & Unwin, 1954)
- "Cobbett's Parliamentary history of England, from the Norman Conquest in 1066 to the year 1803". Thomas Hansard. London: Oxford Digital Library. 1808. Archived from the original on 4 September 2015.
- The Constitutional Year Book for 1913 (London: National Union of Conservative and Unionist Associations, 1913)
- FWS Craig, British Parliamentary Election Results 1832–1885 (2nd edition, Aldershot: Parliamentary Research Services, 1989)
- FWS Craig, British Parliamentary Election Results 1918–1949 (Glasgow: Political Reference Publications, 1969)
- Lewis Namier & John Brooke, The History of Parliament: The House of Commons 1754–1790 (London: HMSO, 1964)
- THB Oldfield, The Representative History of Great Britain and Ireland (London: Baldwin, Cradock & Joy, 1816)
- Henry Pelling, Social Geography of British Elections 1885–1910 (London: Macmillan, 1967)
- J Holladay Philbin, Parliamentary Representation 1832 – England and Wales (New Haven: Yale University Press, 1965)
- Edward Porritt and Annie G Porritt, The Unreformed House of Commons (Cambridge University Press, 1903)
- Colin Rallings & Michael Thrasher (eds), Media Guide to the New Parliamentary Constituencies (London: BBC/ITN/PA News/Sky, 1995)
- Robert Walcott, English Politics in the Early Eighteenth Century (Oxford: Oxford University Press, 1956)
- Robert Waller, The Almanac of British Politics (1st edition, London: Croom Helm, 1983)
- Frederic A Youngs, Jr, Guide to the Local Administrative Units of England, Vol I (London: Royal Historical Society, 1979)

Parliament of the United Kingdom
Vacant since 1765 Title last held by Buckingham	Constituency represented by the prime minister 30 July – 4 August 1766	Vacant until 1770 Title next held by Banbury
