= Cluer =

Cluer is an English surname and given name. It comes from an "occupational name for a nailer". In some cases it may be a variant of Clewer. One Cluer family of London was granted arms in the eighteenth century.

== Surname ==
- Nigel Cluer, Australian swimmer
- Sebastian Cluer, Canadian film director, producer, developer and writer

== Given name ==
- Cluer Dicey (1715–75), English newspaper proprietor

== See also ==
- Clewer, Berkshire
