= John Whittocksmead =

English politician

John Whittocksmead (fl. 1399–1410) of Bath, Somerset, was an English politician.

He was a member (MP) of the parliament of England for Bath in 1399, 1402, 1407 and 1410.
