= Arthur Edwin Way =

English politician

Arthur Edwin Way (c. 1813 – 19 September 1870) was an English politician.

He was a Member (MP) for Bath in 1859.

Parliament of Great Britain
| Preceded by William Tite; Sir Arthur Elton, 7th Baronet | Member of Parliament for Bath; 1859; With: William Tite | Succeeded by William Tite; James McGarel-Hogg, 1st Baron Magheramorne |
