= Roger Hobbes =

English politician

Roger Hobbes (fl. 1413) of Bath, Somerset, was an English politician.

He was a member (MP) of the parliament of England for Bath in May 1413.
