= Edmund Ford (MP died 1440) =

English politician

Edmund Ford (died 1440), of Swainswick, Somerset, was an English politician.

He was a member (MP) of the parliament of England for Bath in February 1388.
