= John Touprest =

English politician

John Touprest or Towprest (fl. 1394) of Bath, Somerset, was an English politician.

He was a member (MP) of the parliament of England for Bath in 1394.
