= Edward Brown (British politician) =

British politician

Sir Edward Joseph Brown, MBE (15 April 1913 – 27 August 1991) was a British Conservative politician.

Brown was educated at Morley College. He became a laboratory technician working with non-ferrous metals. He served as a councillor on Tottenham Borough Council from 1956 to 1962 and as chairman of the National Union of Conservative and Unionist Associations from 1959 to 1960.

Brown contested Stalybridge and Hyde in 1959. He was Member of Parliament (MP) for Bath from 1964 to 1979, preceding Christopher Patten.

In the October 1974 general election, Sir Edward held off a strong challenge from Christopher Mayhew, the Liberal MP for Woolwich East who had defected from the Labour Party. He was knighted for his trade union work before he became an MP.

== Sources ==
- Times Guide to the House of Commons, 1966
- Leigh Rayment's Historical List of MPs

Parliament of the United Kingdom
| Preceded by Sir James Pitman | Member of Parliament for Bath; 1964–1979 | Succeeded by Chris Patten |
