= John Marsh (15th-century MP) =

English politician

John Marsh (fl. 1414–1421) of Bath, Somerset, was an English politician.

He was a Member (MP) of the Parliament of England for Bath in April 1414, 1419 and May 1421.
