= Hugh de la Lynde =

English politician

Hugh de la Lynde (fl. 1391–1397) of Bath, Somerset, was an English politician.

He was a member (MP) of the parliament of England for Bath in 1391, 1393, and September 1397, and for Chippenham in 1394.
