= Sir Arthur Elton, 7th Baronet =

British politician (1818–1883)

Sir Arthur Hallam Elton, 7th Baronet DL (19 April 1818 – 14 October 1883) was a writer and Liberal party politician in the United Kingdom of Great Britain and Ireland. He was the son of Sir Charles Abraham Elton, 6th Baronet.

He was appointed High Sheriff of Somerset for 1857.

Elected as Member of Parliament for Bath at the 1857 general election, he lost his seat in the House of Commons at the 1859 general election because of his opposition to Lord Palmerston's policy on China.

Having inherited from his father both the title and the family's manor house, Clevedon Court in Somerset, he spent the rest of his life improving the town of Clevedon, setting up a lending library and allotments, and building and funding the local cottage hospital (which is still in existence). The west wing of the house was largely destroyed by a fire in 1882 and rebuilt. The house is now owned by the National Trust. He also built Hallam Hall on Dial Hill which was an orphanage. It was later renamed St Edith's children's home and remained in use as a children's home until 1974. The gothic Victorian building is listed and remains largely intact on the outside, but is now converted to luxury flats.

Parliament of the United Kingdom
Preceded by Thomas Phinn and William Tite	Member of Parliament for Bath; 1857 – 1859; With: William Tite	Succeeded by Arthur Edwin Way and William Tite
Baronetage of Great Britain
Preceded by Charles Elton	Baronet (of Clevedon Court, Somerset); 1853–1883	Succeeded by Edmund Elton
