= John Honybrigge =

English politician

John Honybrigge (fl. 1386) of Bath, Somerset was an English politician.

He was a member (MP) of the parliament of England for Bath in 1386.
