= May 1873 Bath by-election =

UK parliamentary by-election

The 1873 Bath by-election was fought on 6 May 1873. The by-election was fought due to the death of the incumbent MP of the Liberal Party, Sir William Tite. It was won by the Conservative candidate Viscount Chelsea.

By-election, 7 May 1873: Bath (1 seat)
Party	Candidate	Votes	%	±%
Conservative	George Cadogan	2,251	53.1	+22.8
Liberal	Jerom Murch	1,991	46.9	−22.8
Majority		260	6.2	N/A
Turnout		4,242	81.9	−4.8
Registered electors		5,182		
Conservative gain from Liberal		Swing	+22.8	
