= Edmond Wodehouse (Bath MP) =

British politician

Wodehouse in 1880

Edmond Robert Wodehouse PC (3 June 1835 – 14 December 1914) was an English Liberal and Liberal Unionist politician who served in the House of Commons from 1885 to 1906.

== Biography ==
Wodehouse was the only child of Sir Philip Edmond Wodehouse, Governor of Bombay, and Katherine Mary Templer daughter of Francis J. Templer. He was educated at Eton College and at Balliol College, Oxford, being awarded B.A. and M.A. 1865. He was called to the bar at Lincoln's Inn in 1861. He was private secretary to his cousin, John Wodehouse, 1st Earl of Kimberley, when he was Viceroy of Ireland from 1864 to 1866, Lord Privy Seal from 1868 to 1870 and Secretary of State for Colonies from 1870 to 1874.

Wodehouse married in 1876 Adele Sophia Harriett Bagot, daughter of Reverend Charles Walter Bagot, Chancellor of Bath and Wells and Rector of Castle Rising, Norfolk.

At the 1880 general election Wodehouse was elected as a Member of Parliament (MP) for Bath. He held the seat until 1906. In 1898 he was admitted to the Privy Council.

Wodehouse died in December 1914, aged 79.

Parliament of the United Kingdom
Preceded by Sir Arthur Hayter; Nathaniel Bousfield	Member of Parliament for Bath; 1880–1906; With: Sir Arthur Hayter 1880–1885; Robert Stickney Blaine 1885–1886; Robert Peter Laurie 1886–1892; Wyndham Murray 1892–1906	Succeeded by Donald Maclean; George Peabody Gooch
