= North Somerset Community Hospital =

- Sirona Care & Health
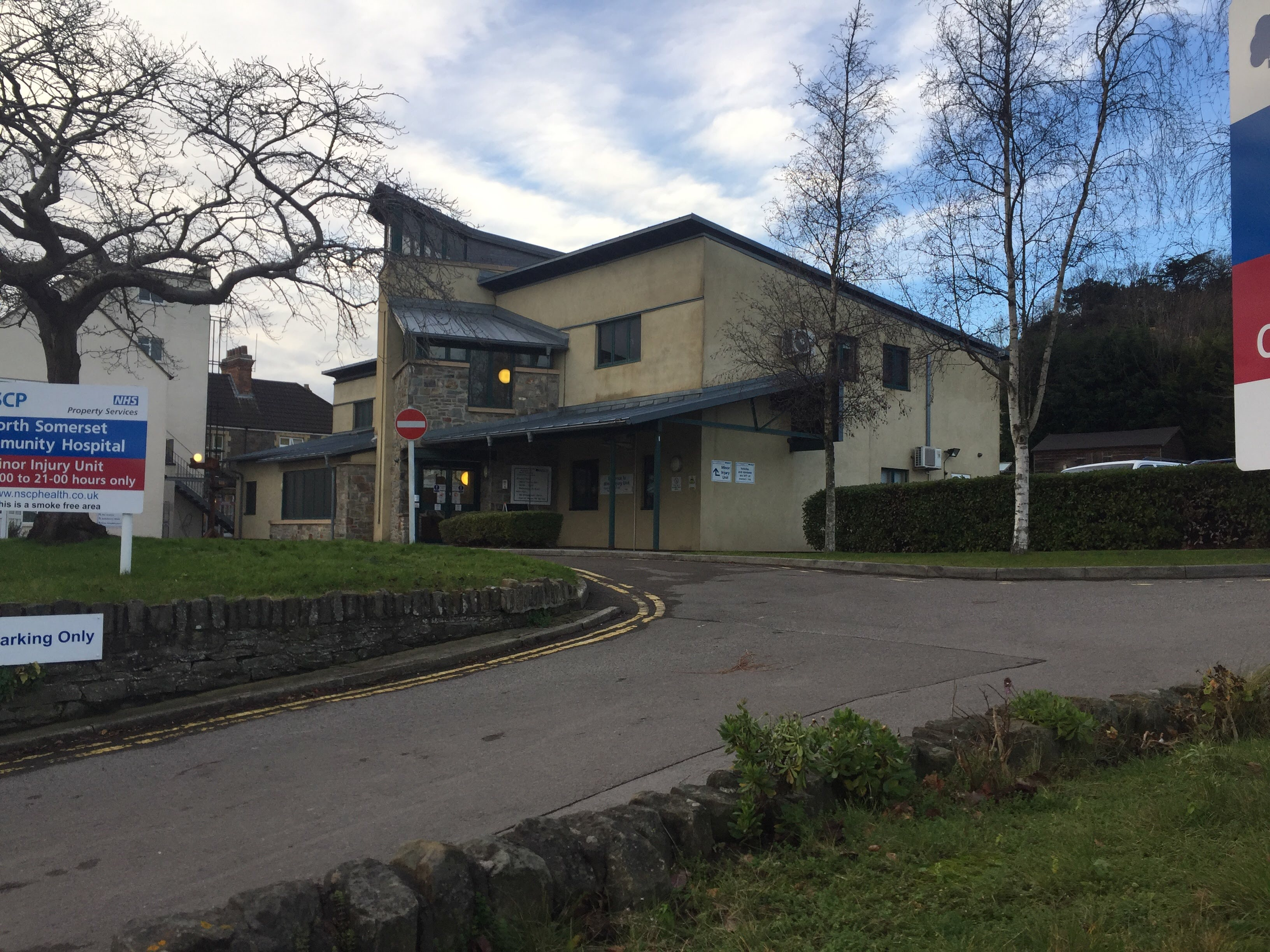
- Entrance to North Somerset Community Hospital in 2018

- Shown in Somerset

Geography
- Location: Old Street, Clevedon, North Somerset, England
- Coordinates: 51.4375°N 2.8470°W

Organisation
- Care system: NHS
- Type: Community

Services
- Emergency department: No

History
- Former names: Clevedon Cottage Hospital; Clevedon Hospital
- Founded: 1875

North Somerset Community Hospital is a health facility in Old Street, Clevedon, North Somerset, England. Since April 2020, it is managed by Sirona Care & Health.

== History ==
The facility was financed and opened by Sir Arthur Hallam Elton, a local member of parliament, as the Clevedon Cottage Hospital in 1875. It joined the National Health Service in 1948 and the inpatient unit was extensively refurbished and modernised between 2016 and 2017.
