= William Radstock =

English politician

William Radstock (fl. 1414) of Bath, Somerset, was an English politician.

He was a member (MP) of the parliament of England for Bath in November 1414.
