= John Chaunceys =

English politician

John Chaunceys (fl. 1390s) of Bath, Somerset, was an English politician.

He was a member (MP) of the parliament of England for Bath in September 1397 and 1399.
