= Robert Stickney Blaine =

British politician (1816-1897)

Sir Robert Stickney Blaine (30 January 1816 – 15 December 1897) was a leading Conservative politician in the English City of Bath, who was mainly involved in local politics, but sat in the House of Commons from 1885 to 1886.

He was the son of Benjamin Blaine of Hull. Following a private education, he moved to Summerhill Park, Bath. He was a magistrate and member of the city council, where he became leader of the Conservative group. In 1872-73 he held the office of mayor.

In 1885 he was elected as one Bath's two members of parliament. However, he found the duties of the office burdensome, and took the opportunity to retire from the House of Commons when a further election was held in 1886, returning to local politics.

He was married twice. In 1869 he married Constance Moger of Bath. Following her death he married Lydia Letitia Purvis, daughter of the late Sir Timothy Vansittart Stonhouse, 14th Baronet. In 1890 Blaine was created a knight bachelor.

In his later years he suffered from ill health, and travelled to Cannes in the south of France on medical advice. He died in Dover while returning from the Continent in January 1897, aged 81.

Parliament of the United Kingdom
Preceded by Sir Arthur Divett Hayter; Edmond Wodehouse	Member of Parliament for Bath; 1885–1886; With: Edmond Wodehouse	Succeeded by Edmond Wodehouse; Robert Peter Laurie
