= Nathaniel Bousfield =

English politician

Nathaniel George Philips Bousfield (1829 – 21 May 1883) was a Liverpool cotton merchant, a leading Volunteer officer, and a Conservative Party politician.

== Volunteer Force ==
Bousfield was an enthusiast for the Volunteer movement. He and 20 fellow gentlemen offered to form a corps in 1852, but this was declined. He founded the Liverpool Drill Club in 1855 with men from the cotton trade, who drilled twice weekly in his warehouse. A further offer to form a volunteer corps was declined in 1857, despite the support of Lieutenant-Colonel Sir Duncan MacDougall of the Royal Lancashire Militia Artillery. However, during the invasion scare of 1859 a public meeting in London led to calls for national Volunteer Force, and Bousfield and MacDougall renewed their offer. When the government gave in to the pressure, Bousfield's commission as Captain-Commandant of the 1st Lancashire Rifle Volunteer Corps, dated 11 June 1859, was the first to be issued in the new force. He later served as Major when the corps expanded to a full battalion.

== Political career ==
Bousfield was a Member of Parliament (MP) for Bath from 31 January 1874 to 1880.

== Personal life ==
Nathaniel was married to Catherine Barratt Bousfield. She died 24 August 1884 at age 54.

He was a member of the Bath and County Club.

== Notes ==
Parliament of the United Kingdom
Preceded by Arthur Egerton; Arthur Hayter	Member of Parliament for Bath; 1874; With: Arthur Hayter	Succeeded by Arthur Hayter; Edmond Wodehouse
