= Nicholas I Samborne =

English politician

Nicholas I Samborne was an English landowner, administrator and politician from Wiltshire.

== Origins ==
Born before 1350, his origins are uncertain beyond the fact that his roots were in Wiltshire: a Richard Samborne, born before 1306, paid tax at Trowbridge in 1327 and 1333.

== Career ==
By 1371 he was witnessing local deeds, standing surety for the keepers of the sequestered alien priories of Avebury and Clatford in 1377, and in 1383 was the victim of a violent assault at Corsham. In 1385 he first undertook duties at royal command, serving as escheator for Wiltshire and Hampshire, and in 1386 and 1387 was appointed to various royal commissions in Wiltshire. In 1391 he was elected Member of Parliament in the Parliament of England for Bath, recorded as “of Biddestone” which indicates that he owned land in that parish, and in 1394 was made a justice of the peace for Wiltshire. After a further royal commission for Wiltshire in 1402, he was appointed coroner for the county in 1405 but relinquished the post on grounds of being “sick and aged”. Another royal commission for Wiltshire in 1407 was followed in 1411 by a royal commission for Gloucestershire in 1411, on which his son also sat. In 1412 he held property in Chippenham and its neighbourhood valued at 20 pounds a year, worth over 16,000 pounds in 2022, and is last mentioned in 1414, when he was at least 64 years old.

== Family ==
His son was Nicholas II Samborne, and he may also have had a son Richard Samborne, but the name of any wife is untraced. Up to 1536, an obiit was held annually on 16 October at the Priory of St Mary in Kington St Michael for the memory of Nicholas Samborne and Nicholas his son, benefactors of the priory.
