= Arthur Egerton, 3rd Earl of Wilton =

British politician & peer (1833-1885)

Arthur Edward Holland Grey Egerton, 3rd Earl of Wilton (25 November 1833 – 18 January 1885), styled Viscount Grey de Wilton from 1833 to 1882, was a British peer and Conservative Member of Parliament from the Egerton family.

Wilton was the third but eldest surviving son of Thomas Egerton, 2nd Earl of Wilton and his first wife Lady Mary Stanley, daughter of Edward Smith-Stanley, 12th Earl of Derby.

He was educated at Eton and Christ Church, Oxford and was elected to Parliament for Weymouth in 1859, a seat he held until 1865, and also represented Bath between 1873 and 1874.

In 1875, seven years before he succeeded his father in the earldom, he was raised to the peerage as Baron Grey de Radcliffe, in the County Palatine of Lancaster.

Lord Wilton married Lady Elizabeth Charlotte Louisa Craven, daughter of William Craven, 2nd Earl of Craven, in 1858. The marriage was childless. Lord Wilton died in January 1885, aged 51. On his death the barony of Grey de Radcliffe became extinct while he was succeeded in the earldom by his younger brother Seymour John Grey Egerton.

Parliament of the United Kingdom
Preceded by William Lockyer Freestun; Robert James Roy Campbell	Member of Parliament for Weymouth and Melcombe Regis; 1859–1865; With: Robert Brooks	Succeeded by Henry Gillett Gridley; Robert Brooks
Preceded by Viscount Chelsea; Donald Dalrymple	Member of Parliament for Bath; 1873–1874; With: Donald Dalrymple	Succeeded by Nathaniel George Philips Bousfield; Sir Arthur Hayter, Bt
Peerage of the United Kingdom
Preceded by Thomas Egerton	Earl of Wilton; 1882–1885	Succeeded by Seymour John Grey Egerton
New creation	Baron Grey de Radcliffe; 1875–1885	Extinct
