= Sewal Fraunceys =

English politician

Sewal Fraunceys (fl. 1380–1386) of Bath, Somerset, was an English politician.

He was a member (MP) of the parliament of England for Bath in January 1380, October 1383 and 1386. He held the position of tax collector in November 1382.
