= Henry Bartlett (MP) =

15th-century English politician

Henry Bartlett (fl. 1406–1410) of Bath, Somerset, was an English politician, cloth merchant and pirate in the English Channel.

He was a member (MP) of the parliament of England for Bath in 1406, 1407 and 1410.
