= Brian Clewer =

- Clewer in 1981
- Born: April 24, 1928; London, England
- Died: April 16, 2008 (aged 79); Cedars-Sinai Medical Center; Los Angeles
- Resting place: Forest Lawn Memorial Park, Glendale, California
- Occupation: Radio host
- Spouse: Suzanne

Brian Clewer (April 24, 1928 – April 16, 2008) was the radio host of "Cynic's Choice" a program of British comedy and British music that aired in Los Angeles for over 40 years.
