= Roger Skinner (MP) =

Member of the Parliament of England

Roger Skinner (fl. 1388) of Bath, Somerset was an English politician and craftsman.

He was a member (MP) of the parliament of England for Bath in September 1388. As of 1379, he was living in Northgate Street, Bath, according to the poll tax assessments.
