= Robert Newlyn (MP) =

English politician

Robert Newlyn (fl. 1421) of Bath, Somerset, was an English politician.

He was a Member (MP) of the Parliament of England for Bath in December 1421.
