= William Shropshire =

English politician

William Shropshire (fl. 1388) of Bath, Somerset, was an English politician.

He was a member (MP) of the parliament of England for Bath in September 1388.
