= Thomas Ayshe =

16th-century English politician

Thomas Ayshe (died 1587), of Batcombe and Bath, Somerset, was an English politician.

He was a member (MP) of the parliament of England for St Germans in 1572 and for Bath in 1584 and 1586.
