= John Palmer (postal innovator) =

English theatre owner

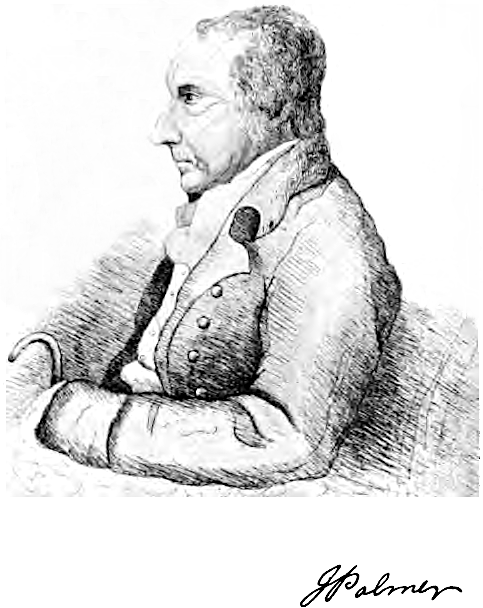
John Palmer at age 75

John Palmer of Bath (1742 – 16 August 1818) was an English theatre owner and instigator of the British system of mail coaches that was the beginning of the great British post office reforms with the introduction of an efficient mail coach delivery service in Great Britain during the late 18th century. He was Mayor of Bath on two occasions and Comptroller General of the Post Office, and later served as Member of Parliament for the constituency of Bath between 1801 and 1807.

== Theatre ==
Palmer was the eldest son of a prosperous Bath brewer and theatre owner who inherited his father's Old Orchard Street Theatre, and obtained a royal letters patent for it in 1768 which gave him an effective monopoly on playhouses in the city and the right to use the title "Theatre Royal", the first theatre outside London to acquire it. Palmer's second theatre in Bristol was granted the same status in 1778, becoming the Theatre Royal, Bristol. Palmer worked as his father's London agent, frequently travelling between London and Bath, and after his father decided to retire in 1776 the patent was transferred to him. He continued to manage the theatre until 1785. The two theatres shared one acting company, so Palmer had to move his actors, stagehands and props quickly between Bristol and Bath, he set up a coach service which provided safe, quick and efficient transport for his actors and materials. Later, when Palmer became involved in the Post Office, he believed that the coach service he had previously run between theatres could be utilised for a countrywide mail delivery service.

== Mail coaches ==
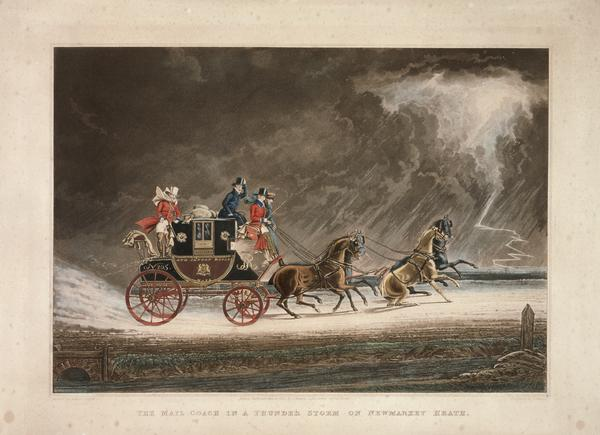
A print showing a mail coach decorated in the black and scarlet Post Office livery near Newmarket, Suffolk in 1827. The guard can be seen standing at the rear.

The postal delivery service in Britain had existed in the same form for about 150 years—from its introduction in 1635, mounted carriers had ridden between "posts" where the postmaster would remove the letters for the local area before handing the remaining letters and any additions to the next rider. The riders were frequent targets for robbers, and the system was inefficient.

Because Palmer made much use of stagecoach services between cities in the course of his business, and noted that it seemed far more efficient than the system of mail delivery then in operation, so that he could travel from Bath to London in a single day while the mail took three days. It occurred to him that this coach service could be developed into a national mail delivery service, so in 1782 he suggested to the Post Office in London that they take up the idea. He met resistance from officials who believed that the existing system could not be improved, but eventually the Chancellor of the Exchequer, William Pitt, allowed him to carry out an experimental run between Bristol and London. Under the old system the journey had taken up to 38 hours. The coach, funded by Palmer, left Bristol at 4 pm on 2 August 1784 and arrived in London just 16 hours later.

Impressed by the trial run, Pitt authorised the creation of new routes. Within the month the service had been extended from London to Norwich, Nottingham, Liverpool and Manchester, and by the end of 1785 services to the following major towns and cities of England and Wales had also been linked: Leeds, Dover, Portsmouth, Poole, Exeter, Gloucester, Worcester, Holyhead and Carlisle. A service to Edinburgh was added the next year, and Palmer was rewarded by being made Surveyor and Comptroller General of the Post Office. By 1797 there were forty-two routes.

== Post Office employment ==
Portrait of John Palmer by Thomas Gainsborouth (c.1775)

Part of Palmer's argument for the changes had been that such an improvement in the service would justify an increase in postal charges, and he had been promised two-and-a-half per cent of any increase in the revenue as well as control of the new service. He was appointed Comptroller General of the Post Office on 11 October 1786, but there was some delay in paying him his share of the very substantial increase in revenue (which had risen from £51,000 in 1784 to £73,000 in 1787). He was eventually granted a payment of arrears after a commission of inquiry investigated in 1789, but not the full sum that he claimed.

Initially the coach, horses and driver were all supplied by contractors. There was strong competition for the contracts because they provided a fixed regular income in addition to which the companies could charge fares for the passengers. By the beginning of the 19th century the Post Office had their own fleet of coaches with black and scarlet livery. The early coaches were poorly built, but in 1787 the Post Office adopted John Besant's improved and patented design, after which Besant, with his partner John Vidler, enjoyed a monopoly on the supply of coaches, and a virtual monopoly on their upkeep and servicing.

As Comptroller General, Palmer was subordinate to the Postmaster General, and although he attempted to reform the operation of the Post Office, he found himself continually at odds with his superior, not least because of his habit of exceeding his legitimate powers without reference to the postmaster.

The development of railways in the 1830s spelt the end for the mail coach service. The first rail delivery between Liverpool and Manchester took place on 11 November 1830. By the early 1840s many London-based mail coaches were starting to be withdrawn from service; the final service from London (to Norwich) was shut down in 1846. Regional mail coaches continued into the 1850s, but these too were eventually replaced by rail services.

== Later life ==
Grant of John Palmer, Esquire (Post Office Services) Act 1813
- Act of Parliament
- Parliament of the United Kingdom
- Long title: An Act for granting the Sum of Fifty thousand Pounds to John Palmer Esquire, in consideration of the Public Services performed by the said John Palmer, in the Improvement of the Post Office Revenue.
- Citation: 53 Geo. 3. c. 157
- Territorial extent: United Kingdom

Dates
- Royal assent: 21 July 1813
- Commencement: 21 July 1813 (Note: The Acts of Parliament (Commencement) Act 1793.)
- Repealed: 5 August 1873
Other legislation
| Repealed by | Statute Law Revision Act 1873 |

Status: Repealed

Text of statute as originally enacted

After a series of controversies, he was effectively dismissed in 1792, but the following year Pitt granted him a government pension of £3,000 a year. However, Palmer continued to press his claim for the much greater sum to which he believed he was entitled, and eventually in 1813 (long after Pitt's death) an act of Parliament, the Grant of John Palmer, Esquire (Post Office Services) Act 1813 (53 Geo. 3. c. 157), was passed to grant him the additional sum of £50,000.

WHEREAS the Commons of the United Kingdom in Parliament assembled have resolved that a Sum not exceeding Fifty thousand Pounds be granted to John Palmer Esquire, out of the Consolidated Fund of Great Britain, in Consideration of the Accommodation afforded to the Public, and the Benefit derived to the Revenue from the Adoption of his Plan for the Conveyance of the Mails, and in full Satisfaction for the Services performed by the said John Palmer; And do therefore most humbly beseech Your Majesty that it may be enacted; and be it enacted by the King's Most Excellent Majesty, by and with the Advice and Consent of the Lords Spiritual and Temporal, and Commons, in this present Parliament assembled and by the Authority of the same, That the Sum of Fifty thousand Pounds shall be issued and paid, out of the said Consolidated Fund of Great Britain, to the said John Palmer Esquire, without any Fee or other Deduction whatsoever, in full Satisfaction and Discharge for the Services performed by the said John Palmer, in the Accommodation so afforded to the Public, and the Benefit derived to the Post Office Revenue as aforesaid; and which said Sum of Fifty thousand Pounds the said John Palmer accepts in full Satisfaction of such Services; Provided always that nothing herein contained shall affect the Payment of a certain Pension or annual Allowance of Three thousand Pounds heretofore made to the said John Palmer out of the Revenues of the Post Office, by virtue of an Order of the Lords Commissioners of His Majesty's Treasury, bearing Date the Twenty eighth Day of June One thousand seven hundred and ninety three. — Grant of John Palmer, Esquire (Post Office Services) Act 1813 (53 Geo. 3. c. 157)

The institution of mail coaches permanently revolutionised the British postal service, and Palmer was widely honoured for it, being presented with the freedom of numerous towns and cities. In Bath he was particularly cherished, becoming mayor in 1796 and again in 1809, and sitting as Member of Parliament (MP) for the city from 1801 to 1808. Such was his influence with the Common Council of Bath (which in those days had the exclusive right to vote for the city's MPs) that he was able to stand down from Parliament in 1808 in the knowledge that his son Charles would be elected in his place.

He died at Brighton in 1818, and was buried in the Abbey Church at Bath.

== Bibliography ==
- Leigh Rayment's Peerage Pages

Attribution:

- This article incorporates text from a publication now in the public domain: "Palmer, John (1742–1818)". Dictionary of National Biography. London: Smith, Elder & Co. 1885–1900.

Parliament of the United Kingdom
| Preceded by Lord John Thynne; Sir Richard Pepper Arden | Member of Parliament for Bath; 1801–1808; With: Lord John Thynne | Succeeded by Lord John Thynne; Charles Palmer |
