= William Heald Ludlow Bruges =

English politician

William Heald Ludlow Bruges (3 March 1796 – 25 September 1855) was an English politician.

He held the office of Member of Parliament (M.P.) for the city of Bath from 1837 to 1841, and for Devizes from 1844 to 1848. He was for many years chairman of the Wiltshire Quarter Sessions and also a Deputy Lieutenant (D.L.) for Wiltshire. He died aged 59 on 25 September 1855, and was buried at Holy Cross parish churchyard at Seend, Wiltshire.
