= Donald Dalrymple =

English surgeon and politician

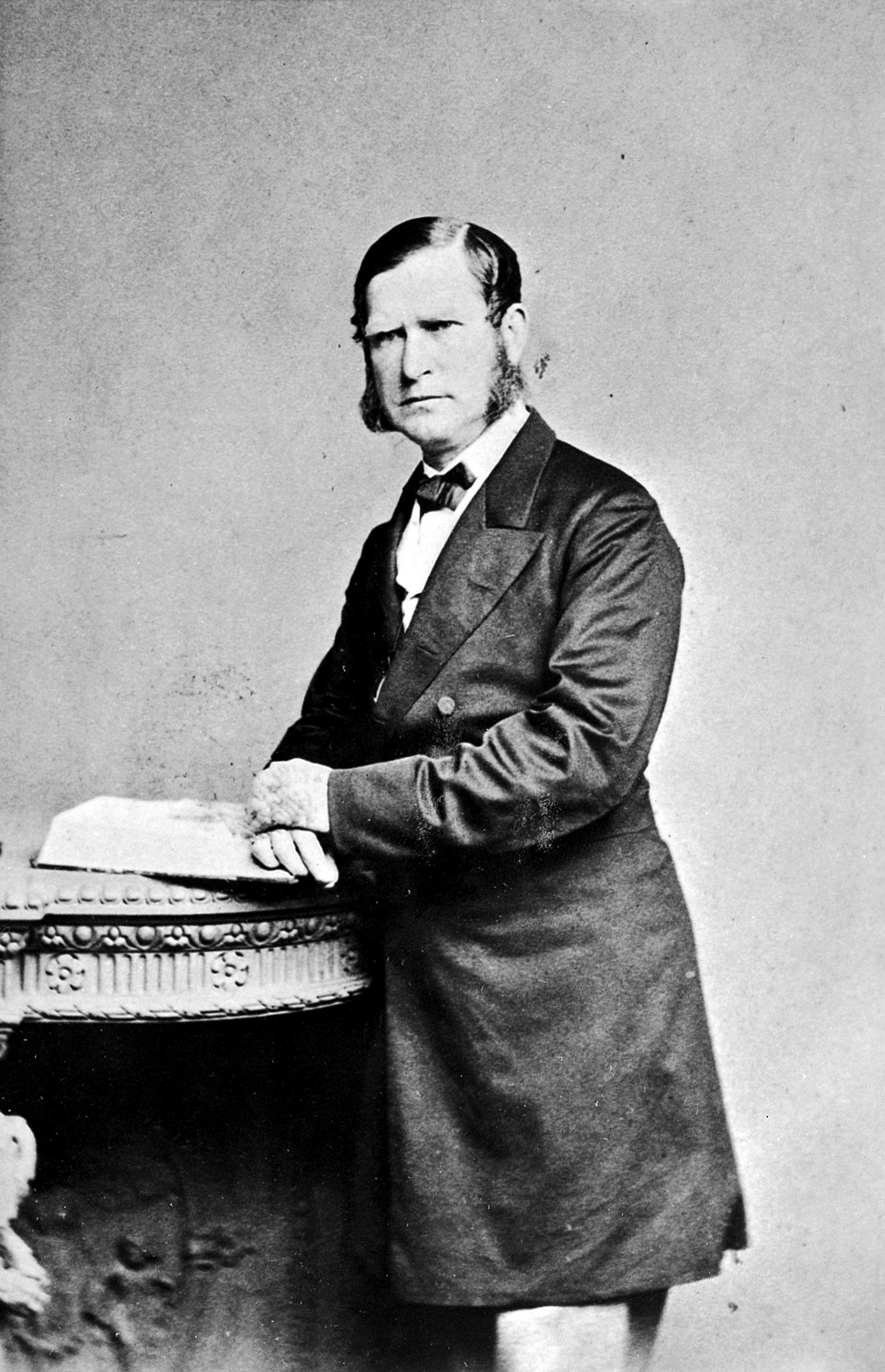
Donald Dalrymple

Donald Dalrymple (1814 – 19 September 1873) was an English surgeon and Liberal politician who sat in the House of Commons from 1868 to 1873.

Dalrymple was born in 1814 in the family of William Dalrymple of Norwich and his wife Marianne Bertram, the daughter of Benjamin Bertram. He was educated at Norwich Grammar School and became a doctor. He was a Licenciate of the Apothecaries' Co., a Fellow of the Royal College of Surgeons, and a member of the Royal College of Physicians. Dalrymple practiced as a surgeon for many years, but retired before entering parliament.

Dalrymple served as Sheriff of Norwich from 1860 to 1861 and a J.P. and deputy lieutenant of Norfolk. He was a director of the Norwich Union Fire Insurance Co., and chairman of the Governors of King Edward VI. Schools. Dalrymple was also a Fellow of the Royal Geographical Society and was the author of On the Climate of Egypt.

At the 1868 general election, Dalrymple was elected member of parliament for Bath. He held the seat until his death in 1873 at age 59.

In January 1872 his application for election to membership of the prestigious Bath and County Club was blackballed by 66 votes to 11.

He died on 19 September 1873.

Dalrymple married Sarah Springfield, daughter of Thomas Osborn Springfield. She died at Thorpe Lodge, Norwich, on 24 March 1900, aged 79 years.

Parliament of the United Kingdom
Preceded by James McGarel-Hogg; William Tite	Member of Parliament for Bath; 1868 – 1873; With: William Tite to May 1873; Viscount Chelsea May–June 1873; Viscount Grey de Wilton from June 1873	Succeeded by Arthur Divett Hayter; Viscount Grey de Wilton
