= Richard Clewer =

English politician

Richard Clewer (fl. 1385–1390) of Bath, Somerset, was an English burgess who briefly sat in two 14th-century parliaments of the Kingdom of England.

He was a member (MP) of the parliament of England for Bath in 1385 and January 1390.
