= George Cadogan, 5th Earl Cadogan =

British Conservative politician (1840–1915)

The Right Honourable The Earl Cadogan KG KP PC JP
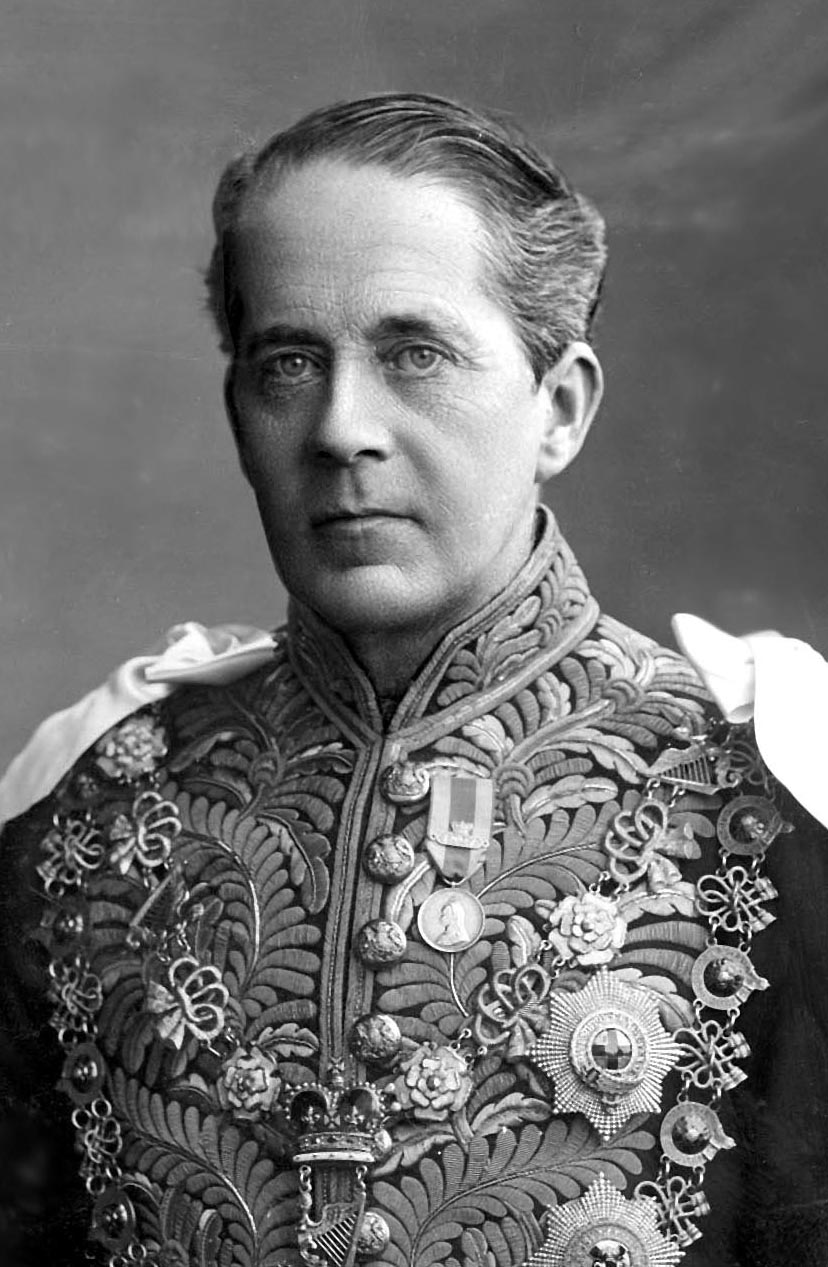

Lord Lieutenant of Ireland
- In office 29 June 1895 – 11 August 1902
- Monarchs: Queen Victoria; Edward VII
- Prime Minister: The Marquess of Salisbury; Arthur Balfour
- Preceded by: The Lord Houghton
- Succeeded by: The Earl of Dudley

Personal details
- Born: 12 May 1840 Durham, England
- Died: 6 March 1915 (aged 74) London
- Party: Conservative
- Spouse(s): (1) Lady Beatrix Craven (1844–1907) (2) Adele Neri (d. 1960)
- Children: 9, including Henry, Gerald, William, Edward, and Alexander
- Education: Christ Church, Oxford

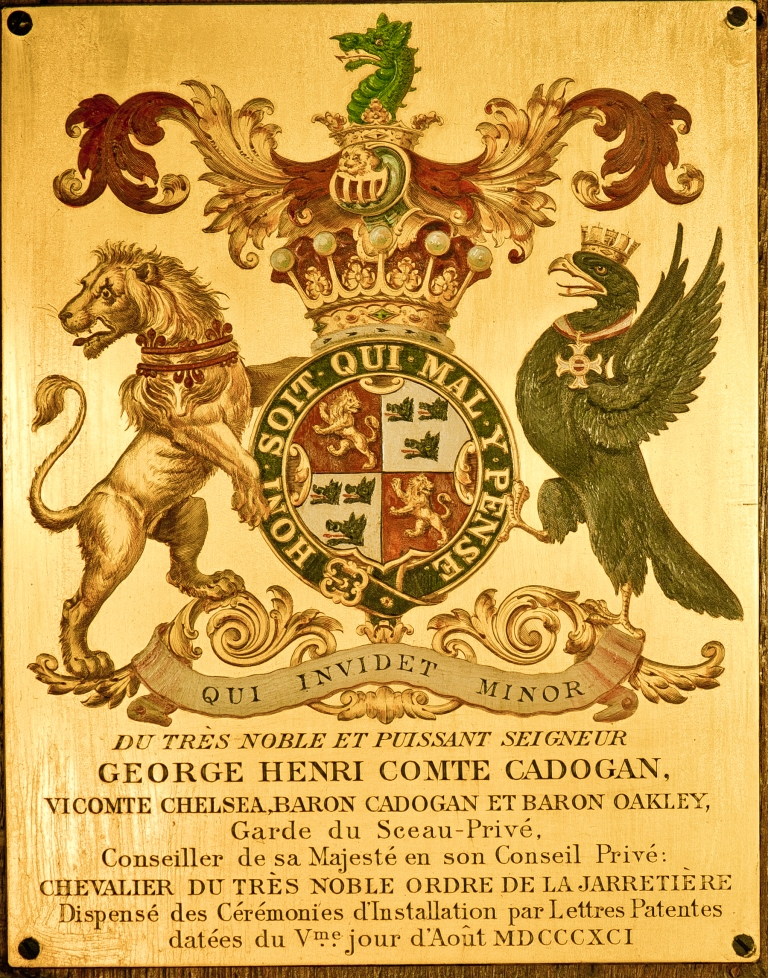
Garter stall plate of George Cadogan, 5th Earl Cadogan, KG, St George's Chapel, Windsor Castle. Arms: Quarterly 1 & 2: Gules, a lion rampant reguardant or (Cadogan); 2 & 3: Argent, three boar's heads couped sable. Crest: Out of a ducal coronet or a dragon's head vert

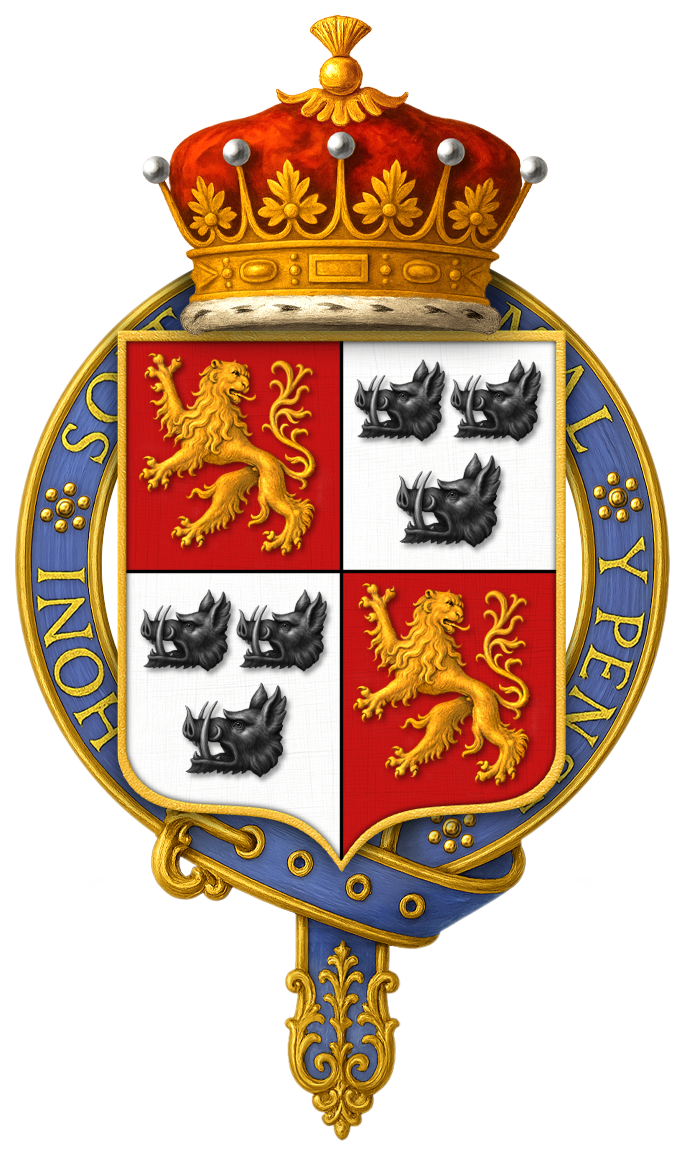
Illustration of Lord Cadogan's garter-encircled arms

George Henry Cadogan, 5th Earl Cadogan (12 May 1840 – 6 March 1915), styled Viscount Chelsea from 1864 to 1873, was a British Conservative politician.

== Background and education ==
Cadogan was the eldest son of Henry Cadogan, 4th Earl Cadogan, by his wife Mary, daughter of Reverend Gerald Wellesley, younger brother of Arthur Wellesley, 1st Duke of Wellington. He was born in the city of Durham and baptised at St James's, Westminster, London. He was educated at Eton College and Christ Church, Oxford.

== Military service ==
As Viscount Chelsea, Cadogan served as a Major in the Royal Westminster Militia from 1865 to 1872; he was later Honorary Colonel of the battalion (which had become the 5th (Royal Westminster Militia) Battalion, Royal Fusiliers) from 1886, and of the 2nd (South Middlesex) Rifle Volunteer Corps from March 1892 to November 1902.

== Political career ==
In the 1868 general election, he stood unsuccessfully as parliamentary candidate for Bury, Lancashire but was successfully returned as member of parliament for Bath in a by-election in May 1873, just before he was ennobled on the death of his father on 8 June and had to move to the House of Lords. He was made Under-Secretary for War in 1875 and Under-Secretary to the Colonies in 1878 by Disraeli.

He served under Lord Salisbury as Lord Privy Seal from 1886 to 1892 (after 1887 in the Cabinet), and again in the cabinet as Lord Lieutenant of Ireland from 1895 to 1902. In the latter office, he supported the Land Law (Ireland) Act 1896 (59 & 60 Vict. c. 47) which enabled Irish tenants to buy their homes from their landlords' estates and pressed the Treasury for more liberal terms than initially intended, appointed commissions to investigate intermediate education (1899) and university education (1901), and sponsored the Agriculture and Technical Instruction (Ireland) Act 1899 (62 & 63 Vict. c. 50) that created a department of agriculture, industries and technical education for Ireland.

He was first Mayor of Chelsea in 1900 and a justice of the peace for the counties of Middlesex, Cambridgeshire, Norfolk, Suffolk and London.

== Philanthropy ==
By 1888, at the initiative of the Fifth Earl, building work was well underway at the south-eastern end of London's Sloane Street to rebuild Holy Trinity Church to the design of the leading Arts and Crafts architect John Dando Sedding. Cadogan funded the entire initial operation, including the commissioning of numerous fittings for the new building by leading sculptors and designers including Henry Wilson (who assumed overall artistic control when Sedding died prematurely), Onslow Ford, Edward Burne-Jones, William Morris, Nelson Dawson and Henry Hugh Armstead. Money was found for the installation of a great organ by James John Walker, which quickly became famous for its cathedral-like effect in the opulent acoustic of the building. The church (and its fittings, including the organ) remain a testament to a very particularly focused example of aristocratic patronage.

As Lord of the Manor of Chelsea, he held large estates there, much of which he dedicated to houses for the working class.

During his lifetime Lord Cadogan commissioned a mausoleum for family interments at Brookwood Cemetery but in 1910 he decided he no longer wanted to be interred in the mausoleum. This building, the largest mausoleum in the cemetery, was bought by the cemetery owners, the London Necropolis Company, fitted with shelves and niches to hold urns, and used as a dedicated columbarium from then on.

== Family ==
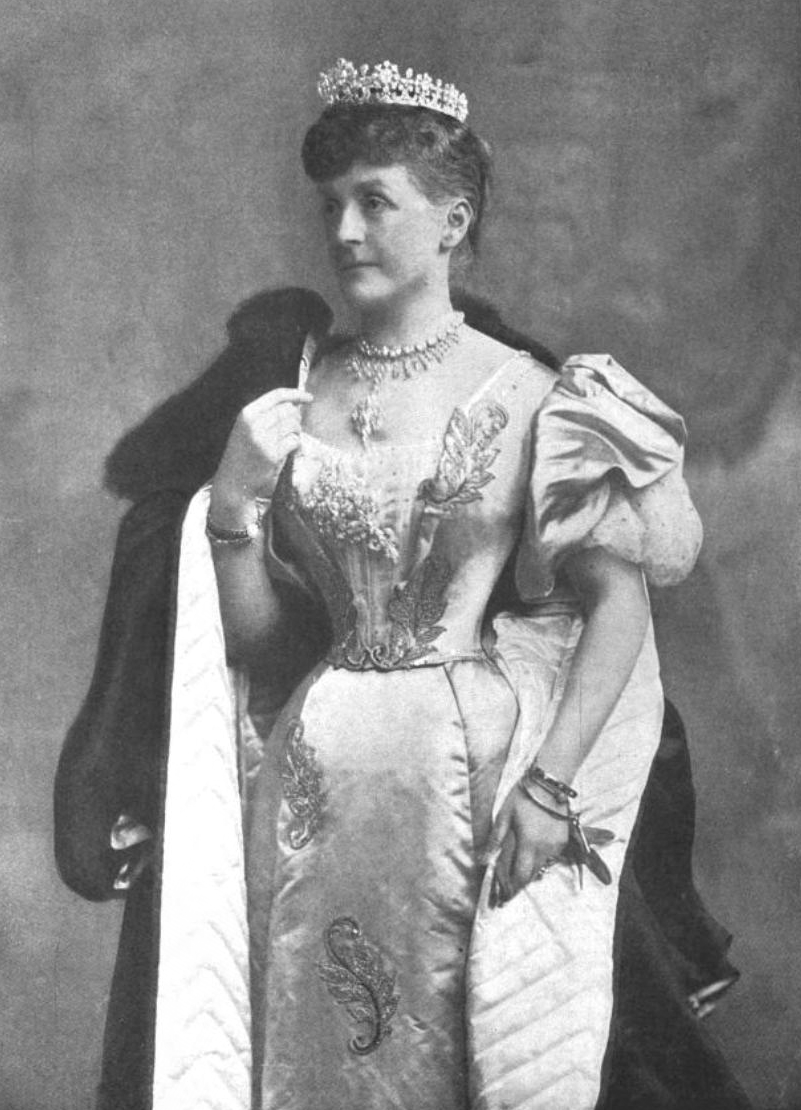
Lady Beatrix Craven in 1900

On 16 May 1865, he married Lady Beatrix Craven, fourth daughter of William Craven, 2nd Earl of Craven. They had nine children:

- Albert Edward George Henry, briefly Viscount Chelsea (1866–1878), a godchild of Albert, Prince of Wales, later Edward VII.
- Henry Arthur, Viscount Chelsea (1868–1908).
- Gerald Oakley, 6th Earl Cadogan and briefly Viscount Chelsea (1869–1933).
- Lady Emily Julia (1871–1909), married William Brownlow, 3rd Baron Lurgan.
- Lewin Edward (1872–1917).
- Lady Sophie Beatrix Mary (1874–1943), married Sir Samuel Scott, 6th Baronet.
- William George Sydney (1879–1914), killed in action.
- Edward Cecil George (1880–1962).
- Alexander George Montagu (1884–1968).

He bought Culford Park, Culford, Suffolk, in 1889 as a family home. It is now a private school.

Lord Cadogan's wife died in 1907 and on 12 January 1911, he married his first cousin once removed, Adele, daughter of Lippo Neri, Count Palagi del Palagio and Olivia Georgiana Cadogan. Lord Cadogan died in Chelsea, London, on 6 March 1915, aged 74. The Countess Cadogan died in February 1960.

Parliament of the United Kingdom
Preceded by Sir William Tite; Donald Dalrymple	Member of Parliament for Bath; 1873; With: Donald Dalrymple	Succeeded by Donald Dalrymple; Viscount Grey de Wilton
Political offices
Preceded by The Earl of Pembroke	Under-Secretary of State for War; 1875–1878	Succeeded by Viscount Bury
Preceded by James Lowther	Under-Secretary of State for the Colonies; 1878–1880	Succeeded by M. E. Grant Duff
Preceded by William Ewart Gladstone	Lord Privy Seal; 1886–1892	Succeeded by William Ewart Gladstone
Preceded by The Lord Houghton	Lord Lieutenant of Ireland; 1895–1902	Succeeded by The Earl of Dudley
Peerage of Great Britain
Preceded by Henry Cadogan	Earl Cadogan; 1873–1915	Succeeded by Gerald Cadogan
