= Nicholas Sambourn (MP for Chippenham and Malmesbury) =

English politician

Nicholas Sambourn (fl. 1394–1395), of Lushill, Wiltshire and Fernham, Berkshire (now Oxfordshire), was an English politician.

He was a member (MP) of the parliament of England for Chippenham in 1394 and for Malmesbury in 1395.
