= Gerald Cadogan, 6th Earl Cadogan =

British peer and professional soldier

Earl Cadogan in 1921.

Gerald Oakley Cadogan, 6th Earl Cadogan, CBE, DL (28 May 1869 – 4 October 1933) was a British peer and professional soldier.

He was the son of George Henry Cadogan, 5th Earl Cadogan and inherited his titles on 6 March 1915 on the death of his father, with two elder brothers having died without male heirs. He married Lilian Eleanor Marie Coxon, daughter of George Stewart Coxon, on 7 June 1911 at Christ Church, Mayfair, London. They had three children, the eldest son of whom was his heir William Gerald Charles Cadogan, 7th Earl Cadogan.

He joined the Army as a lieutenant in the Life Guards, but received a staff appointment as Aide-de-Camp (ADC) to his father when the latter became Lord Lieutenant of Ireland in 1895. Cadogan continued as an Extra-ADC to Lord Dudley, who became Lord Lieutenant in August 1902, but resigned with him in 1905.

In July 1897 he was appointed a captain in the 3rd (West Suffolk Militia) Battalion, Suffolk Regiment. In January 1900 he was seconded for active service as a special service officer in South Africa during the Second Boer War, and he left Southampton early the following month on board the SS Canada. He later served with the South African Constabulary under the Military Governor of Pretoria, and returned to London in January 1902.

He was appointed a Commander of the Order of the British Empire (CBE) on 3 June 1919, and also became Deputy Lieutenant (DL) of Suffolk. He was awarded the rank of Honorary Lieutenant-Colonel in the Suffolk Volunteer Regiment of the Volunteer Training Corps. He was a member of the International Olympic Committee from 1922 to 1929. In that role he is portrayed, by actor Patrick Magee, in the 1981 film Chariots of Fire as urging runner Eric Liddell to appear in an event where the Prince of Wales would be present that was on Sunday at the 1924 Summer Olympics in Paris.

On his death in 1933 aged 64 he was succeeded by his son William Gerald Charles Cadogan, 7th Earl Cadogan. His wife remarried.

Culford Park, the family seat, was sold and is now a private school.

Peerage of Great Britain
Preceded by George Henry Cadogan	Earl Cadogan; 1915–1933	Succeeded by William Gerald Charles Cadogan
