= Arthur Hayter, 1st Baron Haversham =

British politician

The Right Honourable The Lord Haversham PC

Financial Secretary to the War Office
- In office 13 May 1882 – 9 June 1885
- Monarch: Victoria
- Prime Minister: William Ewart Gladstone
- Preceded by: Henry Campbell-Bannerman
- Succeeded by: Sir Henry Northcote, Bt

Personal details
- Born: 9 August 1835
- Died: 10 May 1917 (aged 81)
- Party: Liberal
- Spouse: Henrietta Hope
- Education: Brasenose College, Oxford

Arthur Divett Hayter, 1st Baron Haversham, PC (9 August 1835 – 10 May 1917), known as Sir Arthur Hayter, Bt, from 1878 to 1906, was a British Liberal politician. He served as Financial Secretary to the War Office under William Gladstone from 1882 to 1885.

== Background and education ==
Hayter was the only son of Sir William Hayter, 1st Baronet, by Anne Pulsford, eldest daughter of William Pulsford. He was educated at Eton and Brasenose College, Oxford, and later joined the Grenadier Guards.

== Political career ==
Hayter sat as member of parliament for Wells from 1865 to 1868, for Bath from 1873 to 1885 and for Walsall from 1893 to 1895 and 1900 to 1906. After succeeding his father in the baronetcy in 1878, he served under William Ewart Gladstone as a Lord of the Treasury from 1880 to 1882 and as Financial Secretary to the War Office from 1882 to 1885. He chaired the public accounts committee from 1901 to 1905 and was sworn of the Privy Council in 1901. In January 1906 he was raised to the peerage as Baron Haversham, of Bracknell in the County of Berkshire.

== Personal life ==
Lord Haversham married Henrietta Hope in 1866. They lived at South Hill Park at Easthampstead, now part of Bracknell in Berkshire. There were no children from the marriage and the baronetcy and barony became extinct on Lord Haversham's death 10 May 1917, aged 81.

Parliament of the United Kingdom
Preceded by Sir William Hayter, Bt; Hedworth Jolliffe	Member of Parliament for Wells; 1865–1868; With: Hedworth Jolliffe	Constituency abolished
Preceded by Donald Dalrymple; Viscount Grey de Wilton	Member of Parliament for Bath; 1873–1885; With: Viscount Grey de Wilton 1873–1874; Nathaniel Bousfield 1874–1880; Edmond Wodehouse 1880–1885	Succeeded by Edmond Wodehouse; Robert Stickney Blaine
Preceded by Frank James	Member of Parliament for Walsall; 1893–1895	Succeeded by Sydney Gedge
Preceded by Sydney Gedge	Member of Parliament for Walsall; 1900–1906	Succeeded by Edward Marten Dunne
Political offices
Preceded by Henry Campbell-Bannerman	Financial Secretary to the War Office; 1882–1885	Succeeded by Sir Henry Northcote, Bt
Peerage of the United Kingdom
New creation	Baron Haversham; 1906–1917	Extinct
Baronetage of the United Kingdom
Preceded by William Goodenough Hayter	Baronet (of South Hill Park); 1878–1917	Extinct
