= Alexander Popham (disambiguation) =

Alexander Popham (c. 1605–1669) was an English MP for Bath, Wiltshire and Minehead.

Alexander Popham may also refer to:

- Alexander Popham, nephew of the previous; deaf mute taught by William Holder to speak "plainly and distinctly, and with a good and graceful tone".
- Alexander Popham (died 1556) (1504–1556), MP for Bridgwater, 1545 and 1547
- Alexander Popham (died 1602), MP for Bridgwater (UK Parliament constituency)
- Alexander Popham (died 1705), MP for Chippenham and Bath
- Alexander Popham (penal reformer) (1729–1810), British politician and penal reformer
