= Thomas Tollemache =

English general (1651–1694)

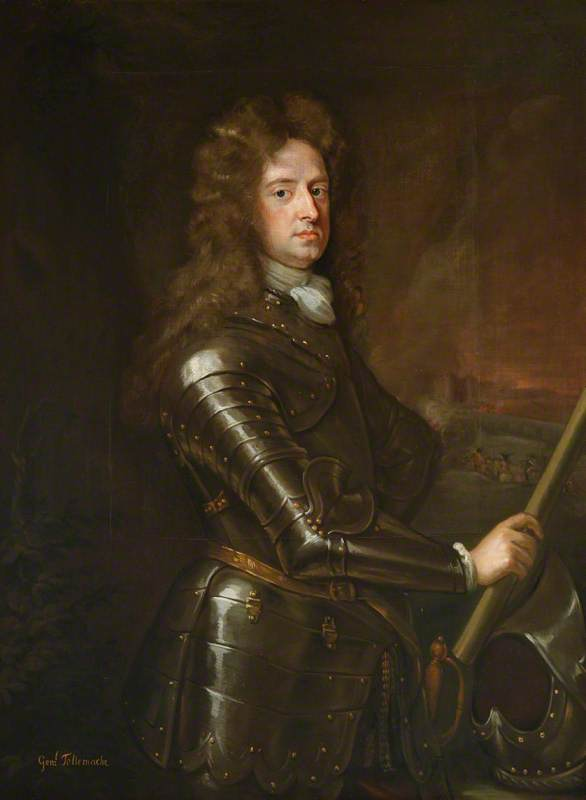

Member of Parliament for Chippenham
- In office January 1692 – June 1694

Governor of Portsmouth
- In office 1690–1694

Member of Parliament for Malmesbury
- In office January 1689 – February 1690

Personal details
- Born: 1651 Helmingham Hall, Suffolk
- Died: 12 June 1694 (aged 42–43) Plymouth
- Resting place: St Mary's, Helmingham
- Education: Queens' College, Cambridge
- Occupation: Military officer, politician

Military service
- Allegiance: England
- Branch/service: English Army
- Rank: Lieutenant-General
- Unit: Coldstream Regiment of Foot Guards
- Battles/wars: Nine Years' War; Battle of Walcourt; Battle of Aughrim; Athlone; Limerick; Steenkerque; Landen; Camaret;

Lieutenant-General Thomas Tollemache (c. 1651 – 12 June 1694) was an English Army officer and politician. Beginning his military career in 1673, in 1686 he resigned his commission in protest at the commissioning of Catholic officers into the Army by James II of England. A supporter of military intervention by the Protestant William of Orange against James II, in early 1688 he joined a regiment of the Anglo-Scots Brigade, a mercenary unit in the Dutch States Army.

In November 1688, he accompanied William to England in the Glorious Revolution and shortly afterwards became colonel of the Coldstream Regiment of Foot Guards and MP for Malmesbury. He fought in Flanders and Ireland during the Nine Years' War, as well as being appointed Governor of Portsmouth in 1690 and elected for Chippenham in 1692. In 1694, he was badly wounded at the Battle of Camaret; he died of his injuries on 12 June and was buried in St Mary's Church, Helmingham.

== Early life ==
Thomas Tollemache was born in 1651, second son of Sir Lionel Tollemache (1624–1669) of Helmingham Hall, Suffolk and Elizabeth, 2nd Countess of Dysart, whose second husband was John Maitland, Duke of Lauderdale. Tollemache never married.

== Military career ==
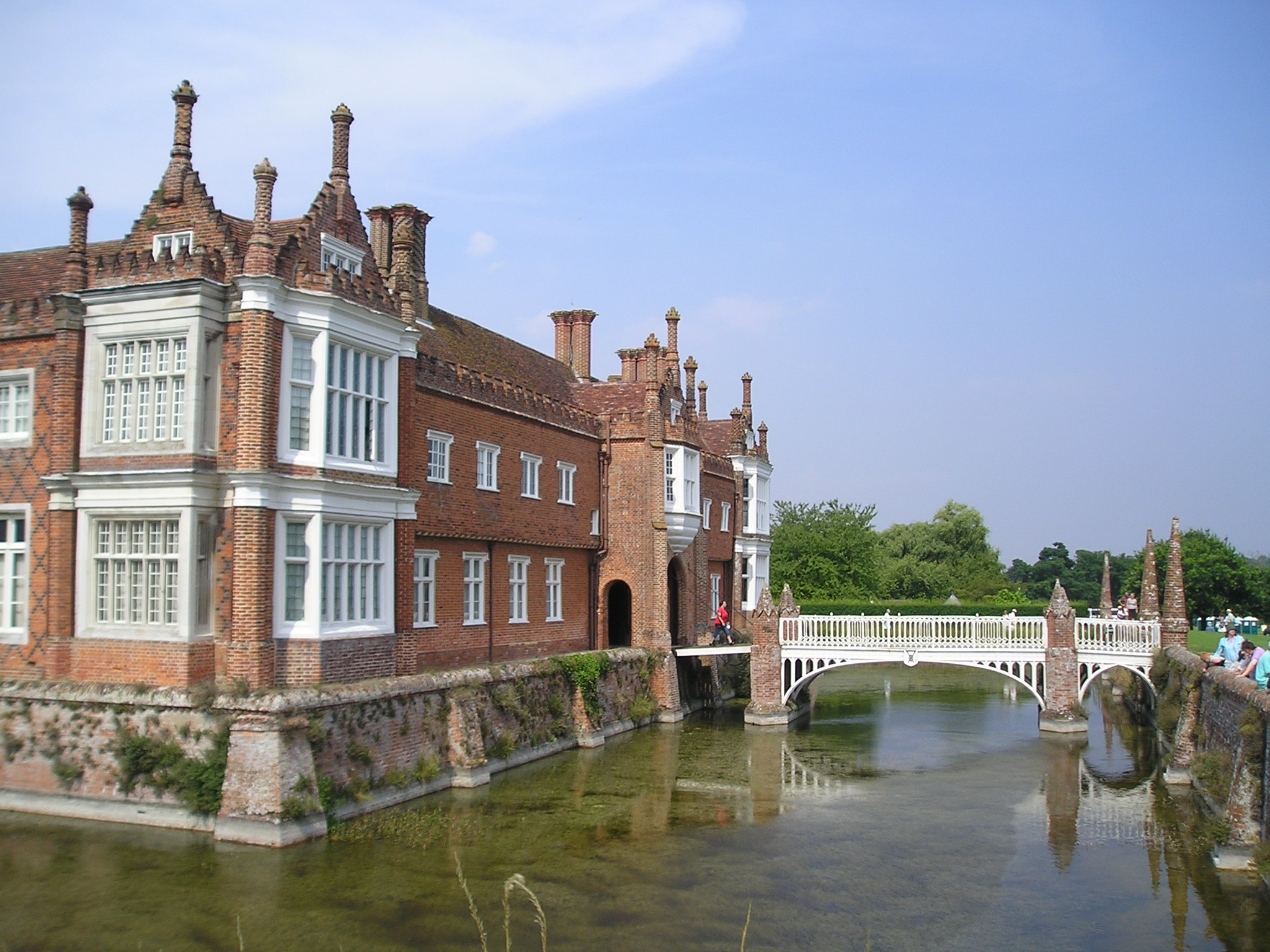
Helmingham Hall, Tollemache's family home

According to his own account, Tollemache spent several years travelling in Europe before returning to England in 1668, when he attended Queens' College, Cambridge, followed by legal training at the Inner Temple. Details of his early military career are unclear; by 1673 he was based in Germany during the Franco-Dutch War, where he served with John Churchill.

In 1678, he was commissioned into the English Army at the rank of captain in the Coldstream Regiment of Foot Guards, with which he served with the Tangier Garrison, along with Percy Kirke and Charles Trelawny. Although he lost his commission after fighting a duel, in 1685 he was appointed lieutenant-colonel in the newly formed Royal Fusiliers. In 1686, he resigned in protest at the admission of Catholic officers by James II, and became a leading member of the "Treason Club", which supported armed intervention by the Protestant William of Orange on behalf of James' daughter Mary II of England.

He was also associated with the Association of Protestant Officers, whose members included Trelawny, Churchill and Kirke, all of whom opposed James. In early 1688, he joined one of the regiments in the Anglo-Scots Brigade, a long established mercenary unit in the Dutch army and accompanied William of Orange during the November 1688 Glorious Revolution. He was made governor of Portsmouth and colonel of the Coldstream Guards, as well as being elected MP for Malmesbury in 1689.

His regiment was posted to Flanders during the Nine Years' War, seeing action at the Battle of Walcourt in August 1689. During 1691, he served in Ireland as a major general, fighting at the Battle of Aughrim and the sieges of Athlone and Limerick. Following the Treaty of Limerick which ended the war, he returned to Flanders where he took part in the battles of Steenkirk and Landen.

== Death ==
In 1694 Tollemache led an assault on the port of Brest; warned of the proposed attack, the French under Sébastien Le Prestre de Vauban reinforced the garrison and strengthened the defences. The ensuing Battle of Camaret was disastrous for the English who were repulsed with heavy losses; Tollemache was wounded and later died of his injuries in Plymouth on 12 June 1694. He was buried in the church of St Mary's at Helmingham.

== Sources ==
- Hayton, DW (2002). TOLLEMACHE, Hon. Thomas (c.1650-94), of Leicester Fields, Westminster in "The History of Parliament; the House of Commons 1690-1715. Boydell & Brewer.
- Holmes, Richard (2009). Marlborough; England's Fragile Genius. Harper Press. ISBN 978-0007225729.
- Wauchope, Piers (2004). "Tollemache, Thomas (c.1651–1694)". Oxford Dictionary of National Biography (online ed.). Oxford University Press. doi:10.1093/ref:odnb/27500. (Subscription, Wikipedia Library access or UK public library membership required.)

Parliament of England
Preceded by Sir Thomas Estcourt; John Fitzherbert	Member of Parliament for Malmesbury; 1689–1690; With: Charles Godfrey	Succeeded by Goodwin Wharton; Sir James Long
Preceded by Alexander Popham; Sir Basil Firebrace	Member of Parliament for Chippenham; 1692–1694; With: Alexander Popham	Succeeded by Alexander Popham; Richard Long
Military offices
Preceded by The Duke of Berwick	Governor of Portsmouth; 1690–1694	Succeeded by Thomas Erle
Preceded by The Earl of Craven	Colonel of the Coldstream Guards; 1690–1694	Succeeded by The Lord Cutts
Preceded by Sir Robert Holmes	Governor of the Isle of Wight; 1693	Succeeded by The Lord Cutts
