= John Popham (judge) =

English judge and politician (died 1607)

Sir John Popham
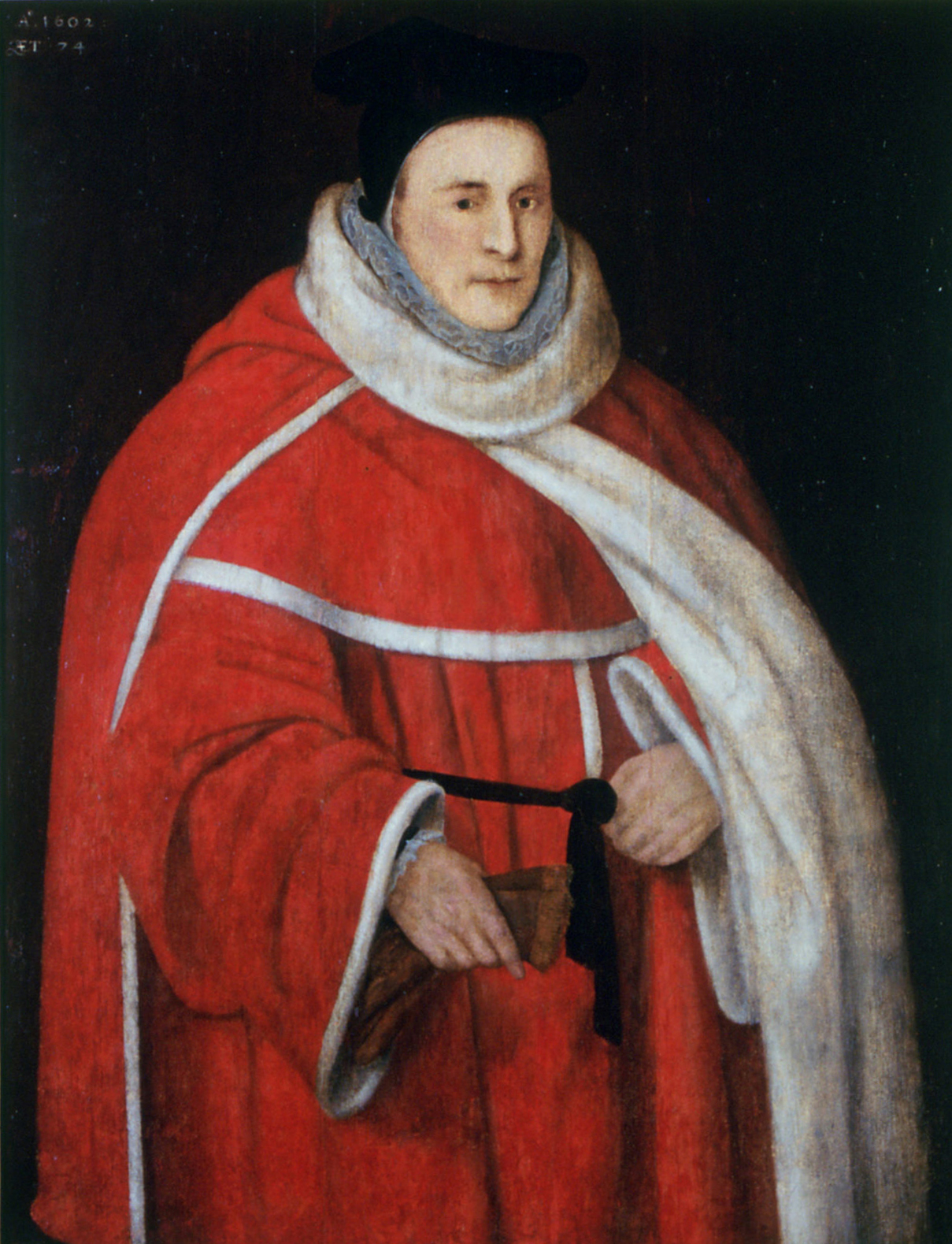
- Sir John Popham (1531–1607), Lord Chief Justice. 1602 portrait by unknown artist, collection of Harvard Law School
- Born: c. 1531; Huntworth, North Petherton, Somerset
- Died: 10 October 1607 (aged 75–76); Wellington, Somerset
- Occupations: Speaker of the House of Commons, Attorney General, Lord Chief Justice
- Spouse: Amy Adams (alias Games)
- Parent(s): Alexander Popham, Jane Stradling

Signature
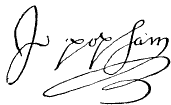

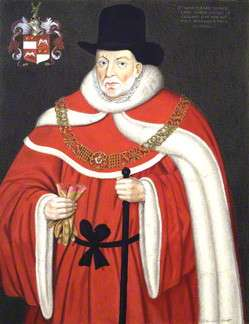
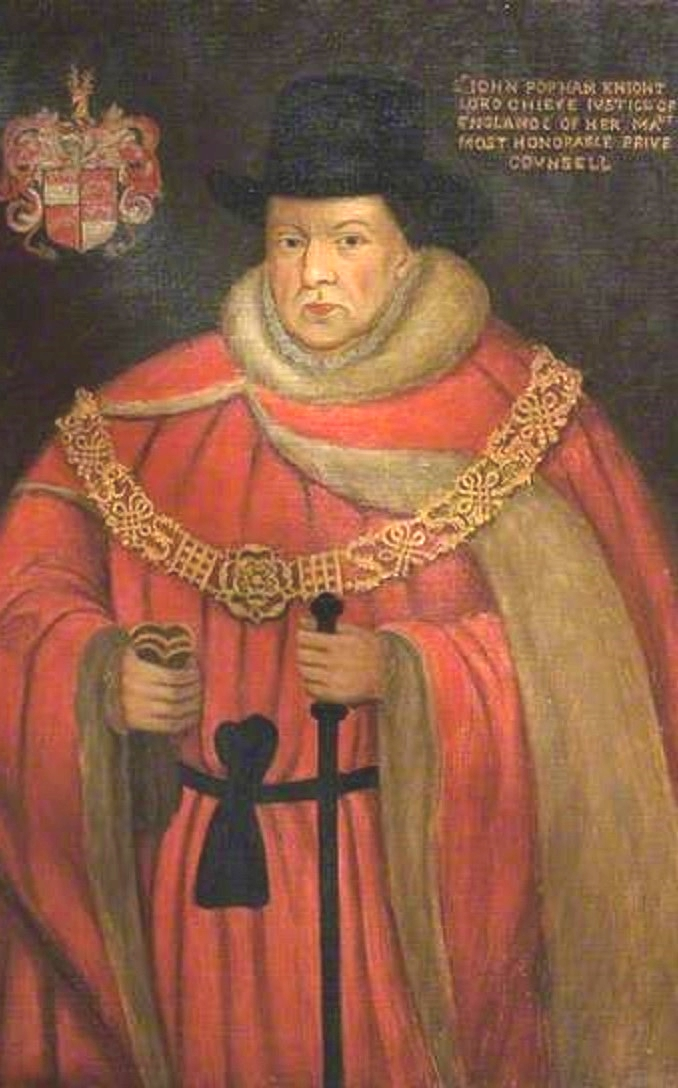
Sr. John Popham knight Lorde Cheife Justice of England & of her Maj. most honorable Privie Counsell. Sir John Popham (1531–1607), Lord Chief Justice. Left: Copy by George Perfect Harding (1781–1853) of lost original by unknown artist. National Portrait Gallery, London, NPG 2405; right another existing version, possibly original or further copy from same source
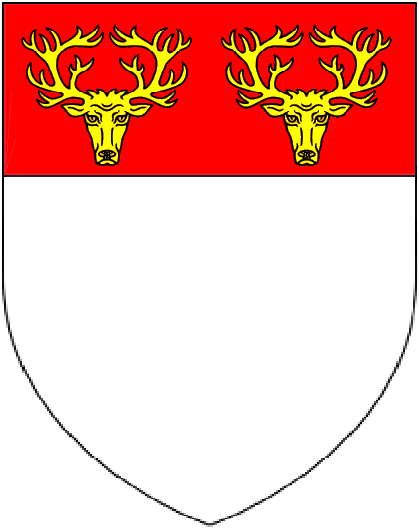
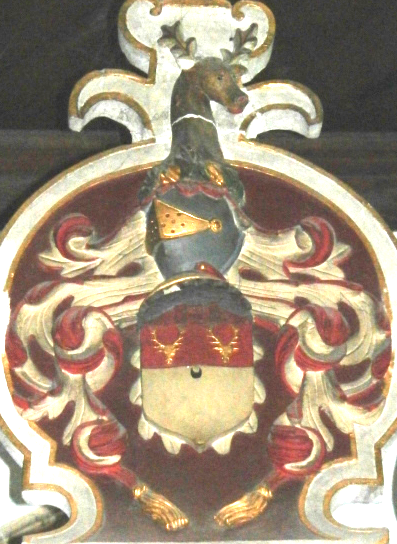
Arms of Popham: Argent, on a chief gules two stag's heads cabossed or; right: detail from monument to Sir John Popham in Wellington Church, showing a crescent sable for difference with crest: A stag's head and neck erased proper

Sir John Popham (c. 1531 – 10 June 1607) of Wellington, Somerset, was Speaker of the House of Commons (1580 to 1583), Attorney General (1581 to 1592) and Lord Chief Justice of England (1592 to 1607).

== Origins ==
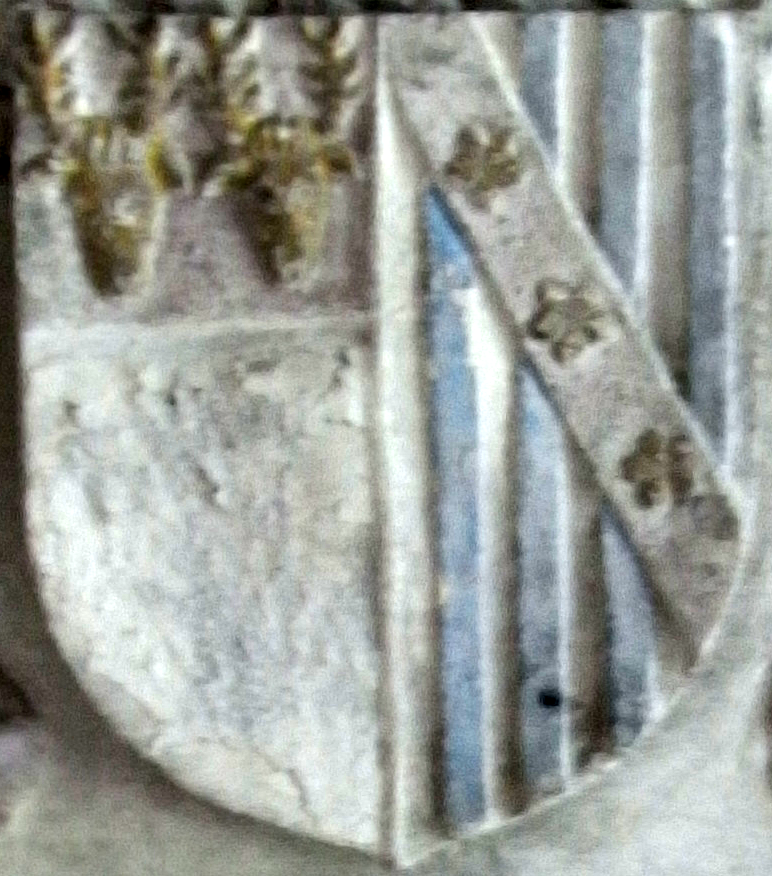
Escutcheon in the Pole Chapel of Colyton Church, Devon, showing arms of Popham impaling Stradling (Paly of six argent and azure, on a bend gules three mullets or), representing the marriage of Sir John Popham's parents

Popham was born in 1531 at Huntworth in the parish of North Petherton, near Bridgwater, in Somerset, the second son of Alexander Popham (c. 1504 – 1556) of Huntworth, twice MP for Bridgwater in 1545 and 1547, by his wife Jane Stradling, a daughter of Sir Edward Stradling (died 1535) of St Donat's Castle, Glamorgan; one of Jane's brothers is Thomas Stradling. St Donat's Castle situated on the south coast of Glamorgan was a short sail across the Bristol Channel into the inland port of Bridgwater on the River Parret. The Popham family had held the manor of Huntworth since the 13th century when Sir Hugh de Popham (tempore Edward I) (a younger son of the Popham family of the manor of Popham, Hampshire) married Joan de Kentisbury, daughter and heiress of Sir Stephen de Kentisbury of Huntworth. His nephews included George Popham, founder of Popham Colony (of which Sir John was one of the principal financial backers) and Sir William Pole (1561–1635), the historian of Devon.

== Education ==
He was educated at Balliol College, Oxford, where he read classics and divinity, and entered the Middle Temple as a law student.

== Career ==
He served as an MP for Lyme Regis in 1558 and for Bristol in 1571 and 1572 and was a Justice of the Peace in Somerset. He served in the honourable position of Recorder of Bridgwater and of Bristol. He was promoted to serjeant-at-law in 1578 and appointed Solicitor-General in 1579. In 1581 he was elected Speaker of the House of Commons and later that year was appointed Attorney-General. In 1592, the year he was knighted, following the death of Sir Christopher Wray, he was appointed Chief Justice of the Queen's Bench, which position he retained until his death.

Popham is credited with maintaining the stability of the British State, and for being one of the "real colonisers" of the British Empire; hosting two Wabanaki tribesmen kidnapped on the Maine coast in 1605, subsequently funding and orchestrating the aborted Popham Colony at the mouth of the Kennebec River, Maine (1607–1608).

Popham became a very wealthy man, and amongst the many estates he owned was Publow in Somerset, Littlecote in Wiltshire, and Hemyock Castle in Devon. In Peter Blundell's will of 1599 Popham was asked to establish a free grammar school in the town of Tiverton in Devon, which resulted in his founding of Blundell's School which opened in 1604 and still exists to this day.

== Famous trials ==
In 1595 Popham presided over the trial of the Jesuit Robert Southwell and passed a sentence of death by hanging, drawing and quartering. He also presided over the trials of Sir Walter Raleigh (1603) and the conspirators of the Gunpowder Plot, including Guy Fawkes (1606). He was also involved in the trial at Fotheringhay Castle of Mary, Queen of Scots (1587) which resulted in her execution.

While working as the messenger to the Queen, Popham was imprisoned by Robert Devereux, 2nd Earl of Essex with his henchman. Ever stoic, Popham replied that at his age, death would be "but cutting off a few years". However, he was rescued and rowed to safety by Sir Ferdinando Gorges (1565–1647).

He was noted for his severity towards thieves, and for strict enforcement of the Penal Laws.

== Marriage and children ==
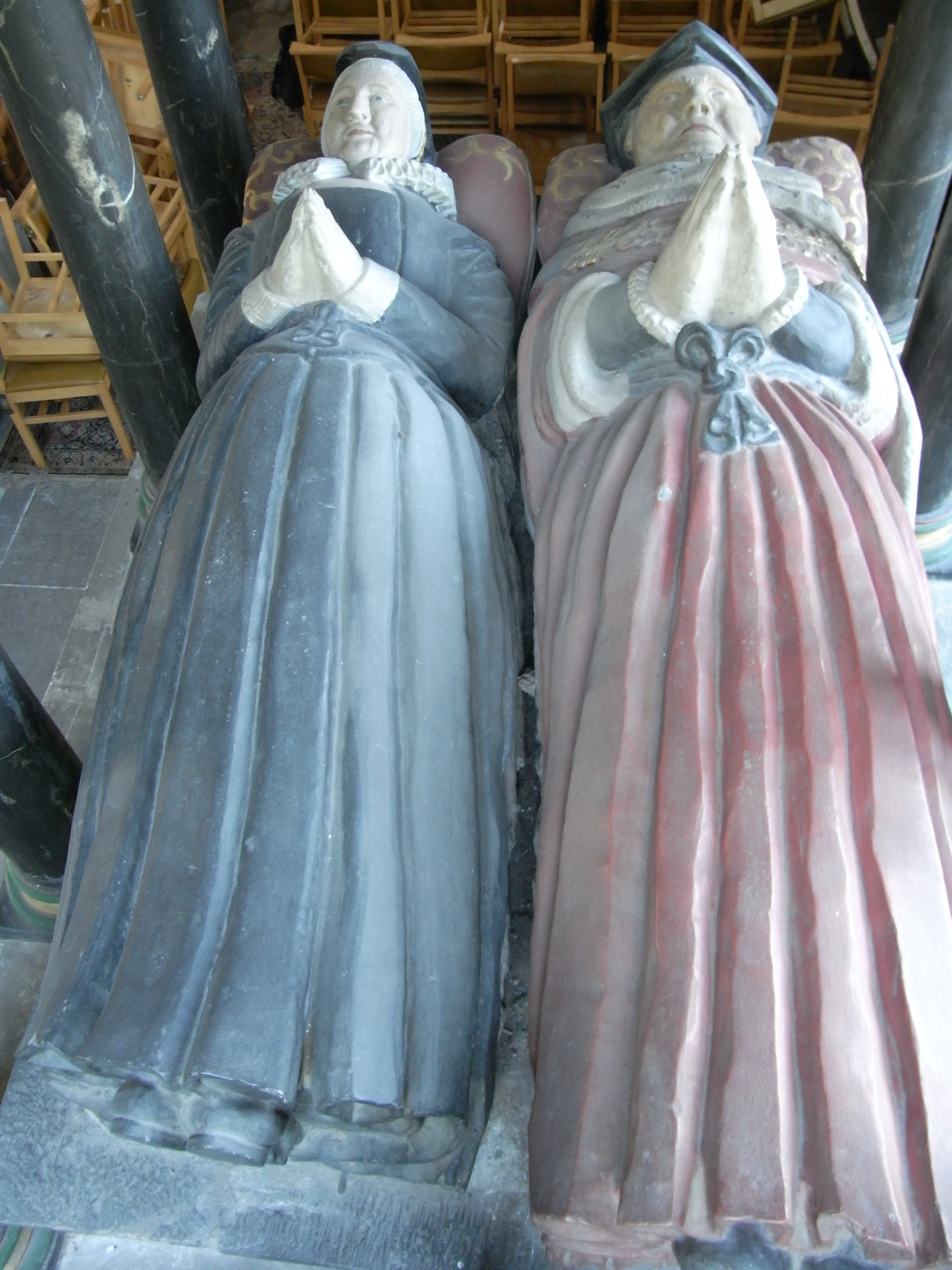
Effigies of Sir John Popham and his wife Amy Adams, Wellington Church

John Popham married Amy Adams (alias Games), daughter and heiress of Hugh (alias Howel) Adams (alias Games) of Castleton, Glamorgan, a fortified manor house 800 metres north-east of the village of St Athan. Castleton was from the early 12th century the caput of the lordship of St Athan established by the Nerber family, and held from the overlords the Earls of Gloucester, comprising 4 knight's fees. John de Nerber was the last in the line, and died in the early 16th century. In 1528, "by corrupt dealings", Castleton was acquired by Howel Adams. In 1538 Leland (died 1552) recorded: "Castleton, a manor place on a hille ascending from the ripe. And late it (be)longgid to one Hugh Adam, a man of mene lands whos doughter is now heir of it". By his marriage Popham inherited Castleton and sold it to his maternal relative Sir Thomas Stradling of St Donat's Castle. By his wife he had issue one son and six daughters including:

- Sir Francis Popham (c. 1573 – 1644), only son, and heir, MP, of Wellington, Somerset and Littlecote, Wiltshire, who married Anne Gardiner Dudley and was the father of Edward Popham (1610–1651), General-at-Sea, and of Colonel Alexander Popham (1605–1669), JP, MP, who fought for the Parliamentarians during the Civil War and had a garrison stationed at Littlecote House. Another of his descendants was Admiral Sir Home Riggs Popham (1762–1820), who developed the Signal Code adopted by the Navy in 1803.
- Penelope Popham;
- Elinor Popham; married Sir Roger Warre of Hestercombe (d. 1616).
- Elizabeth Popham (d.1637), wife of Sir Richard Champernowne (1558–1622), lord of the manor of Modbury in Devon, Sheriff of Devon in 1591, created a knight of the Bath in 1599.
- Mary Popham;
- Amy Popham.

== Residences ==
=== Wellington House, Somerset ===
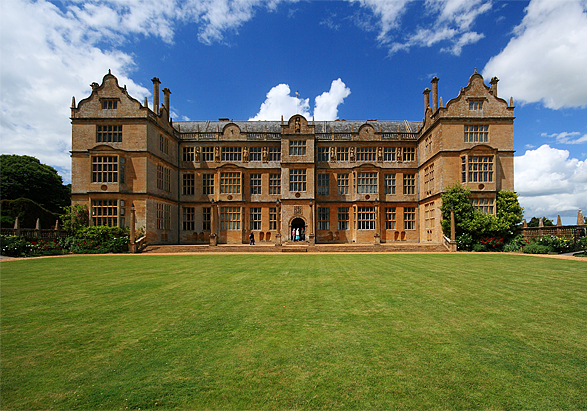
Montacute House, east front, comparable in size and date to Wellington House built by Sir John Popham and destroyed in 1645

As his main residence he built Wellington House, a "large and stately mansion" in the town of Wellington, Somerset, "only slightly smaller than Montacute" also in Somerset (built in about 1598 by Sir Edward Phelips, Master of the Rolls and the prosecutor during the trial of the Gunpowder Plotters). It was destroyed during the Civil War (1642–1651), having been "obtained by strategem by one Bovet of Taunton who converted it into a garrison for the use of the Parliament army and defended it for a considerable time against Sir Richard Grenville who came to its rescue in which contest it was so battered that it was never afterward deemed worthy repairing". In March 1645 the Royalist commander Grenville was ordered to march into Somersetshire and assist in the siege of Taunton. While inspecting the fortifications of "Wellington House" he was severely wounded, and obliged for a time to resign the command of his forces to Sir John Berkeley. Wellington had probably been supplying Blake with necessaries for some time, and Colonel Bovet, a very ardent Parliamentarian, got possession of Popham's house and made it a stronghold for his party. So against Wellington Grenville directed the Royalist force and levelled Popham's house almost to the ground, himself being so severely injured that the leadership of his men had to be transferred to Sir John Barkley. The following document dated 19 October 1650 was addressed to Justices of Peace of Somerset:

"Anne Martyn of Wellington, widdowe, being in the howse of the Honourable Alexander Popham with her family, att the seige thereof by the late Kinge's forces, sustayned greate losses of goodes and cattle, viz., several kine, one heifer, tenne young cattle, three calves, five colts, a mare and a horse, forty sheepe, five bedds with their furniture, bacon, butter, and cheese, wool, lynnen, corne of all sorts, pewter, brasse, and other moveable goodes, valued in all att the summe of ... hundred and threescore and fifteen poundes, besides the summe of twenty and two poundes in ready money; and that her eldest sonne was killed in the said howse by the said late Kynges forces. Signed Rich. Bouell, Alexander Popham, Edw. Popham, John Pyne."

=== Littlecote House, Berkshire ===
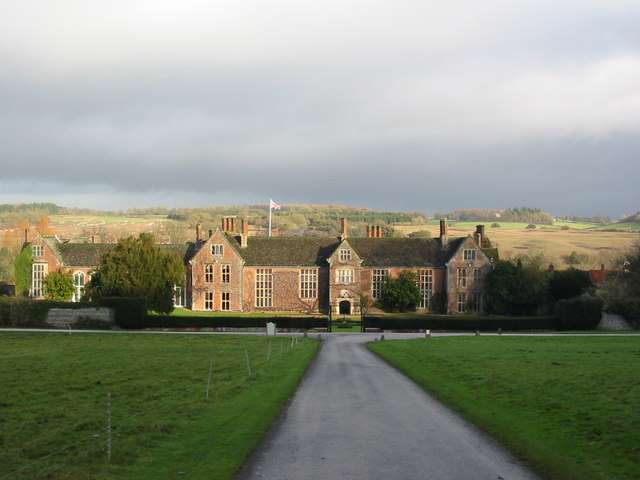
Littlecote House, south front added by Sir John Popham after 1589. His armorials sculpted in stone survive above the front door

Popham acquired the reversion of the estate of Littlecote in Berkshire (today in Wiltshire) from William Darrell (1539–1589), MP, and following the latter's death in 1589 duly became its owner. The historian John Aubrey (1626–1697) stated that Popham had acquired Littlecote as a bribe for having obtained a nolle prosequi in favour of the murderer William "Wild" Darrell, which account Rice (2005) deemed "not accurate" and "A story of passion, murder and confusion". Popham expanded the house and added a south wing in red-brick, which structure survives today. His armorials survive above the south porch.

Following the destruction of Wellington House in the Civil War, Littlecote became the principal seat of his descendants, the last of whom in the male line was Francis Popham (died 1779), of Littlecote and Hunstrete, Somerset, who died childless. He bequeathed his estates to his wife Dorothy (née Hutton) who in turn left them to "Francis Popham, the reputed son of my late husband" but only as a tenant for life. This illegitimate son died in 1804 when, under the terms of Dorothy's will, the estates reverted to her husband's nephew Edward William Leyborne (born 1764), who in 1805 in accordance with the terms of the bequest assumed by royal licence the additional surname and arms of Popham. The Leyborne Popham family sold Littlecote in 1929 to Sir Ernest Wills, and moved to their other seat at Hunstrete House, Pensford, Somerset.

== Death and burial ==
Popham died on 10 June 1607 at Wellington, Somerset. He was buried in the Church of St John the Baptist, Wellington, where his large free-standing monument survives.

== Monument, Wellington Church ==
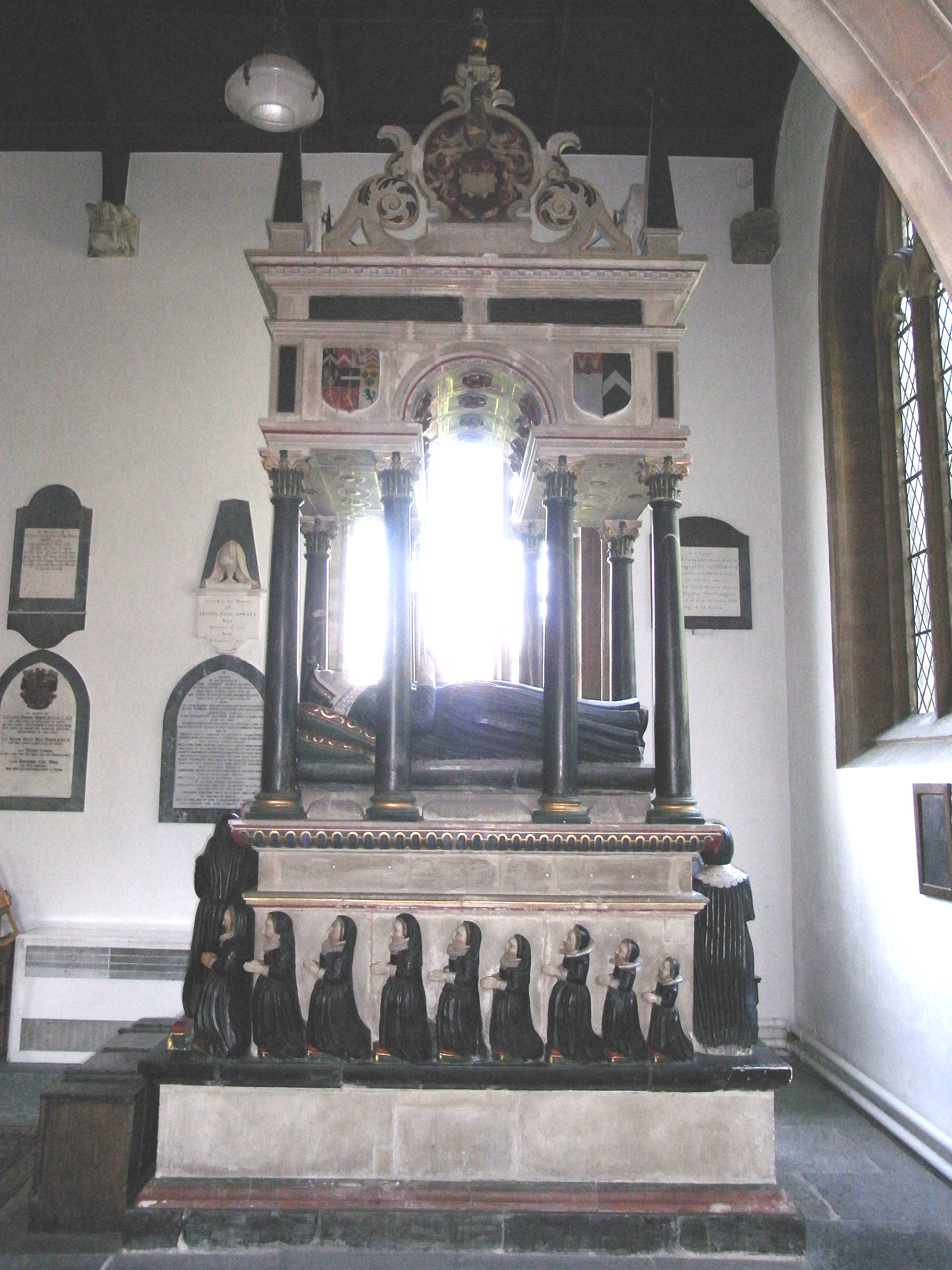
Monument to Sir John Popham in Wellington Church, viewed from south

At the east end of the north aisle of St John the Baptist's Church in Wellington, survives the 18-foot-high monument with effigies of Sir John Popham and his family. As described by Collinson (died 1793) in 1791 it was situated in the south aisle chapel, from which it has been moved to its present position, but retaining the same orientation. Collinson described the monument as follows:

"In the chapel on the south side of the church is a magnificent tomb, surrounded with a pallisado of wood and iron, on the table of which lie the effigies of Sir John Popham, and that of his lady. He is dressed in his judges robes, chain, and small square black cap; and placed with his head towards the west. On the lower basement, at the head and feet, are four other smaller figures of two men and two women, kneeling face to face. On the north side of the same basement are five boys and eight girls, dressed in black, kneeling in a row. And on the south side are nine women kneeling in the fame manner. Over Sir John and his lady is a superb arched canopy, ornamented with the family arms, roses, paintings, and obelisks; the whole supported by eight round columns of black marble, five feet high, with Corinthian capitals green and gilt".

The two male and female couples kneeling opposite each other separated by a prie-dieu, shown at each end of the monument, are believed to represent his 34-year-old son Sir Francis Popham and the latter's wife (east-end) and his parents, represented as a middle-aged couple (west-end). The nine female kneeling figures on the south side, all facing westward, are believed to represent Sir John Popham's six daughters with three ladies maids, the latter three figures kneeling behind the daughters and wearing plain not lace ruffs. The kneeling figures on the north side are believed to represent the five sons (facing westwards) and eight daughters (facing eastwards) of Sir Francis Popham, the son of Sir John Popham. Inscribed on a stone tablet on the west side of the entablature is the following text:

Sr John Popham Knighte and Lord Chief Justice of England and of the Honorable Privie Councell to Queene Elizabeth and after to King James, aged 76, died the 10th of June, 1607 and is here interred.

== Heraldry ==
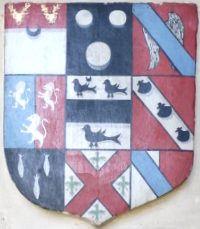
Popham arms of 9 quarters, monument to Sir John Popham, Wellington Church

A heraldic escutcheon is shown on the north side of the monument to Sir John Popham in Wellington Church of nine quarters as follows:

- 1: Argent, on a chief gules two stag's heads cabossed or (Popham), with a crescent sable for difference
- 2: Sable, three plates (Clark, for Joan Clark, wife of Gilbert de Popham (died 1250) of Popham, Hampshire, and daughter of Robert Clark, feoffee of the manor of Popham. According to the Victoria County History of Hampshire (1908) Gilbert de Popham (died 1251) acquired Popham from "Thurstan the Clerk" by unknown means. An earlier Thurstan was clerk to William de Pont de l'Arche, and was evidently the same Thurstan who was Sheriff of Hampshire in 1155 and who obtained confirmation from the Empress Maud of all his land of Popham which he had held at the death of Henry I)
- 3: Gules, a pair of wings in lure argent overall a bend azure (Seymour? Reigny?)
- 4: Per pale azure and gules three lions rampant argent (Herbert, Earl of Pembroke)
- 5: Argent, a fess between three martlets sable, with a crescent sable for difference (Edmondes, for Agnes Edmondes, daughter and heiress of William Edmondes and wife of William Popham (died 1464) of Huntworth)
- 6: Gules, on a bend argent three escallops sable (Knoell, Knolle, Knowles, etc., for Isabel Knolle daughter and heiress of Thomas Knolle and wife of John Popham (died 1536) of Huntworth, grandfather of Sir John Popham (died 1607), as shown on the monument to Katherine Popham (died 1588), mother of Sir William Pole (died 1635), in Colyton Church, Devon.
- 7: Sable, three fishes palewise tails uppermost argent (Unknown family, apparently a Knolle heiress)
- 8: Argent, a saltire gules between four eagles displayed azure (Hampden, an heiress of Knolle, as shown on monument to Katherine Popham (died 1588), mother of Sir William Pole, in Colyton Church, Devon.
- 9: Per pale argent and gules overall a bend azure (?)

Legal offices
| Preceded by Sir Christopher Wray | Lord Chief Justice; 1592–1607 | Succeeded by Sir Thomas Fleming |
Honorary titles
| Preceded by Sir Amias Paulet | Custos Rotulorum of Somerset bef. 1594 – 1607 | Succeeded by Sir Edward Phelips |
Political offices
| Preceded by Sir Robert Bell | Speaker of the House of Commons; 1580–1583 | Succeeded by Sir John Puckering |
