= Richard Long (died 1730) =

English politician (1668–1730)

Richard Long (1668 – 19 January 1730) was an English politician.

Baptised in Collingbourne Kingston, Wiltshire on 7 April 1668, he was the son of Richard Long of Collingbourne Kingston by his wife Elizabeth, daughter of Edward Long of Rood Ashton, Wiltshire. He married Elizabeth, daughter of Thomas Long of Rowden, Chippenham. They had two sons, one of whom was Richard Long (c. 1691–1760), and one daughter.

He was High Sheriff of Wiltshire from 1702 to 1703.

A member of the Whig party, Long was elected Member of Parliament (MP) for Chippenham on 19 November 1694, defeating his opponent Sir Basil Firebrace by 17 votes. After the election there was an allegation of fraud on the part of Long and his supporters, who, a Committee of Inquiry were told, had bribed and threatened certain voters in order to secure their vote. The committee found that Firebrace's supporters had in fact bribed the witnesses to make false claims, and Long was exonerated.

His representation in Parliament was brief. As a supporter of the Immorality Bill he believed the remedy for poverty was the suppression of alehouses, "the most... intolerable grievance we have." He died on 19 January 1730.

Parliament of England
Preceded by Thomas Tollemache; Alexander Popham	Member of Parliament for Chippenham; 1694–1695; With: Alexander Popham	Succeeded by Walter White; Alexander Popham
