= Alexander Popham =

English politician (1605–1669)

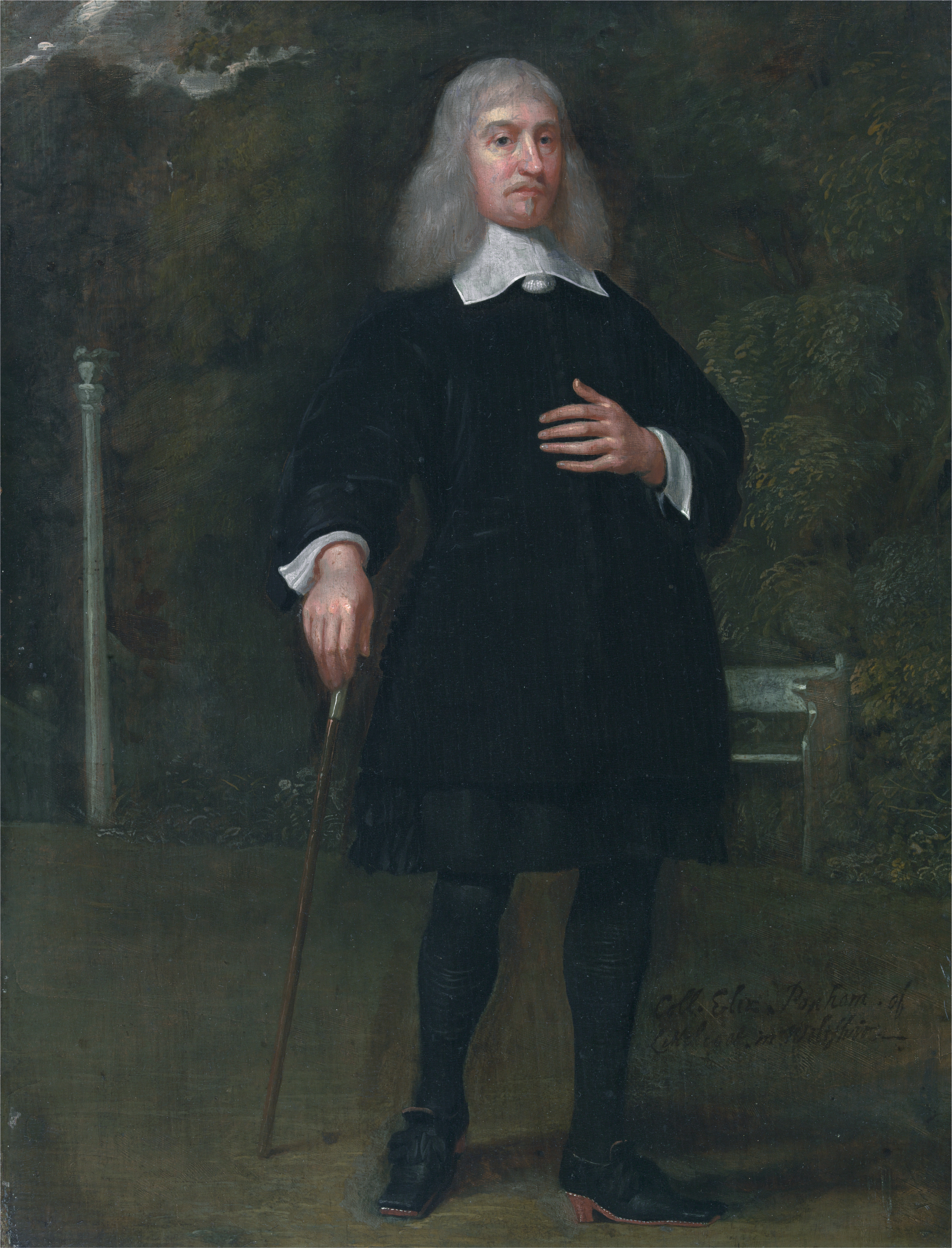
Colonel Alexander Popham, of Littlecote, Wiltshire, portrait circa 1660-5 by Abraham Staphorst

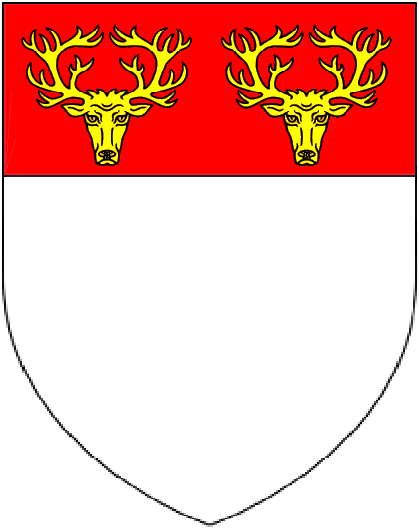
Arms of Popham: Argent, on a chief gules two stag's heads cabossed or

Alexander Popham (1605 – 1669) of Littlecote, Wiltshire, was an English politician who sat in the House of Commons at various times between 1640 and 1669. He was patron of the philosopher John Locke.

== Early life ==
Popham was born at Littlecote House in Wiltshire, the son of Sir Francis Popham and Anne Gardiner Dudley, and grandson of Sir John Popham and wife Amy Games. He was educated at Balliol College, Oxford, and admitted to the Middle Temple in 1622.

== Antebellum ==
Popham was a prominent figure and Justice of the Peace in Somerset. In April 1640 he was elected Member of Parliament for Bath in the Short Parliament. He was re-elected MP for Bath for the Long Parliament in November 1640.

== Civil War and Interregnum ==
Popham came from a Presbyterian family and was himself an elder in the church. He supported the Parliamentary cause. On the outbreak of war he was colonel of the Bath Trained Band, the part-time force of local infantry. After it served in the Siege of Sherborne in September 1642, he took its weapons early in 1643 to arm a full-time regiment of foot for Parliament. Popham's Foot saw action in the 1643 Western campaign that culminated in the Battle of Roundway Down near Devizes. He also had a garrison stationed at Littlecote House.

Despite his Presbyterianism, Popham's sympathies lay with the Army during the Second Civil War, so he survived Pride's Purge in late 1648 and – after the execution of Charles I and the founding of the Commonwealth – he served on the Council of State.

In 1654, he was elected MP for Bath again in the First Protectorate Parliament. He was elected MP for Wiltshire in the Second Protectorate Parliament and for Minehead in the Third Protectorate Parliament. He did not support the Protectorate and although he sat in the Protectorate parliaments he refused to take his seat in Cromwell's Other House (1657–1658).

== Restoration ==
In April 1660, he was elected MP for Bath in the Convention Parliament. After the restoration of the monarchy, he made his peace with Charles II and entertained him to a "costlie dinner" at Littlecote. He was re-elected MP for Bath in 1661 to the Cavalier Parliament.

== Family ==
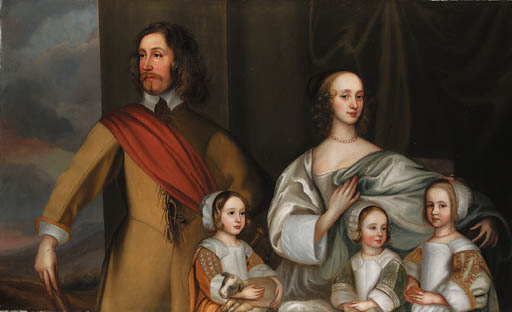
Group portrait of Alexander Popham of Littlecote, Wiltshire, with his wife, Letitia Carre, and three daughters, Essex, Letitia and Anne, painting by artist from circle of Robert Walker

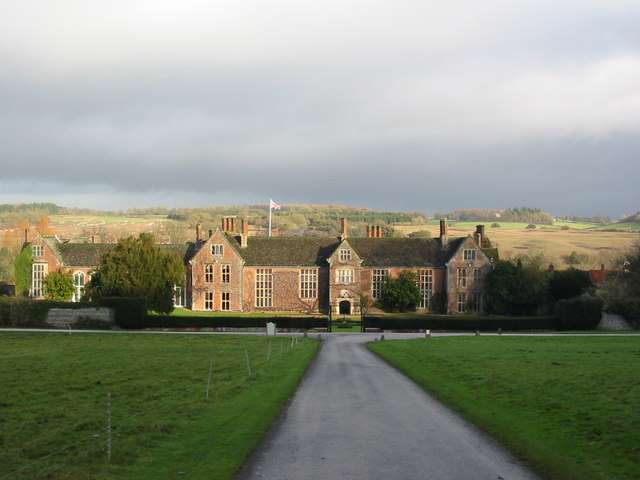
Littlecote House, Wiltshire, the seat of the Popham family

Popham inherited from his father in 1644, his older brother John (also an MP) having died in 1637.

Popham married first Dorothy Cole (died 1643) and second Letitia Carre, daughter of William Carre of Ferniehurst, Scotland, half brother to Robert Carre, favourite of King James I. By his second wife, he had eight children, of whom six, three sons and three daughters, survived into adulthood:

- Sir Francis Popham (died 28 August 1674), of Littlecote, Wiltshire, who married Helena Rogers and had children:
  - Alexander Popham, who married Anne Montagu, daughter of Ralph Montagu, 1st Duke of Montagu. Their daughter, Elizabeth (died 20 March 1761), married firstly Edward Montagu, Viscount Hinchingbrooke, and secondly Francis Seymour, of Sherborne, Dorset.
  - Letitia Popham (died 1738), who married Sir Edward Seymour, 5th Baronet, her aunt's step-son. Her son was Edward Seymour, 8th Duke of Somerset, who inherited the dukedom from his father's 6th cousin Algernon Seymour, 7th Duke of Somerset who died in 1750 without male children.
- Alexander Popham (died 4 January 1718/19) who married Jane French and inherited the estates from his nephew Alexander.
- George Popham (died 28 January 1686/87), who married Dulcibella Ford and was the progenitor of the Pophams of Winchester and the Isle of Wight.
- Essex Popham, eldest daughter, who married on 17 August 1663 John Poulett, 3rd Baron Poulett and had children.
- Letitia Popham (died 16 March 1714), who became the second wife of Sir Edward Seymour, 4th Baronet, of Berry Pomeroy in Devon.
- Ann Popham (died 20 April 1684), who married William Ashe of Heytesbury in Wiltshire.

=== Deaf nephew ===
This Alexander Popham is not to be confused with his nephew Alexander Popham, son of Alexander's brother Edward Popham, who was born deaf and was taught to speak by two scientists, John Wallis and William Holder. He is considered to be one of the earliest cases of a born deaf person learning to talk.
