= Abraham Staphorst =

Dutch painter

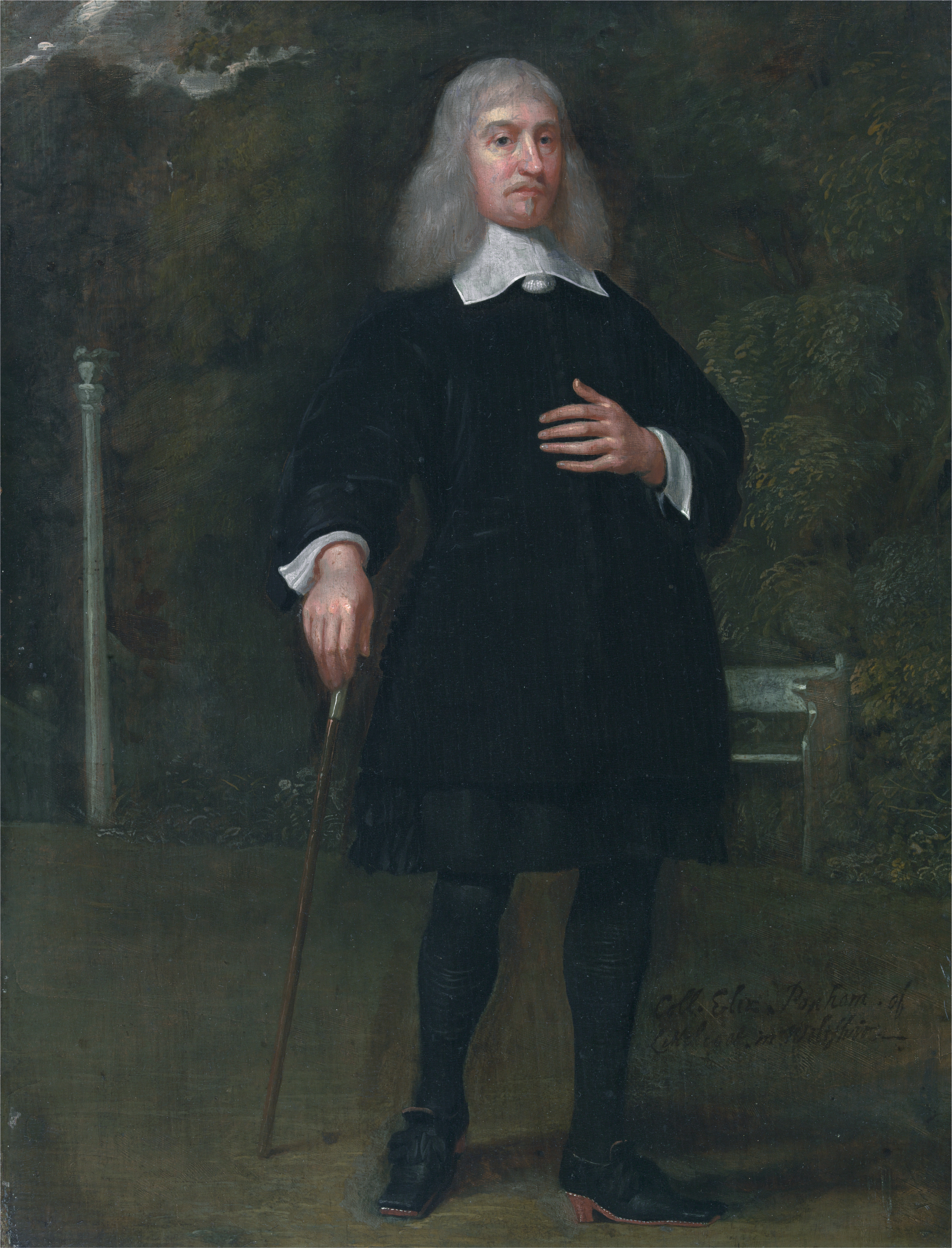
Colonel Alexander Popham, of Littlecote House, Wiltshire, by Abraham Staphorst

Abraham Staphorst, or Staphortius (ca. 1638, Edam – 1696, Dordrecht), was a Dutch Golden Age painter.

== Biography ==
According to Houbraken he was a good portrait painter and the son of Johannes Staphortius, a well known preacher of Dordrecht, whose portrait he often sketched with chalk or charcoal on the walls of the taverns he visited with the remark, "Do you want to see my father?".

According to the RKD he moved to Dordrecht in 1643. He visited Rome as a young man, and worked in London, The Hague, Amsterdam, and Norwich before settling in Dordrecht.
