= Firebrace baronets =

Extinct baronetcy in the Baronetage of England

The Firebrace Baronetcy, of London, was a title in the Baronetage of England. It was created on 28 July 1698 for Basil Firebrace, Member of Parliament for Chippenham from 1690 to 1692. He was the son of Sir Henry Firebrace. The third Baronet sat as Member of Parliament for Suffolk. The title became extinct on his death in 1759.

== Firebrace baronets, of London ==
Escutcheon of the Firebrace baronets of London

- Sir Basil Firebrace, 1st Baronet (1652–1724)
- Sir Charles Firebrace, 2nd Baronet (1680–1727)
- Sir Cordell Firebrace, 3rd Baronet (1712–1759)

Baronetage of England
Preceded by Clarke baronets	baronets 28 July 1698	Succeeded by Norris baronets
