= Henry Firebrace =

Sir Henry Firebrace (c. 1619 - 1691) was a courtier to Charles I, serving during his conflicts with Parliament throughout the era of the English Civil Wars. He later served Charles II as a Clerk of the Green Cloth and was knighted about 1685.

== Early life ==
The Firebrace family are presumed to have been of Norman origin, the name being variously argued to mean "strong of arm" (fier-a-bras) or more likely as a term of admiration for some feat of battle. It is unknown when they moved to England but the family eventually lived in Derbyshire, where Henry was born, the sixth son of Robert Firebrace of Derby and Susan Jerome of Kegworth, Leicestershire in 1619 or 1620.

He attended Repton School until the age of about 14, shortly after which his family moved to London, and Firebrace was apprenticed to a scrivener. In 1643, he was appointed secretary to Basil Feilding, 2nd Earl of Denbigh's council of war.

== Service to Charles I ==
Despite Firebrace's links to Denbigh, who aligned with the Parliamentarians, it appears that his sympathies were monarchist; he later claimed to "have been of service to [the king] at Uxbridge" in 1645. In 1647, when the Scots had delivered the king to the English at Newcastle, and his former servants were dismissed by the Parliamentarians, Firebrace arranged to be appointed by Denbigh to "attend to his majesty as one of the pages of the bedchamber", at the king's request, and was trusted with the task of guarding Charles. At the same time, Firebrace was acting as a double agent, ensuring transit of the king's correspondence and in planning his escape. While ostensibly guarding Charles in November 1647, he allowed the king to escape from Hampton Court.

In 1648, when Charles was imprisoned on the Isle of Wight, Firebrace (still trusted by the forces of Cromwell) continued to act as a conduit for illicit communications and to develop further escape plans. One attempt, in which the plan was to lower the king to the ground using a rope, failed when Charles, who had ascertained that his head would pass through the window-frame, became lodged and was stuck there; of this, Firebrace would later write

"I gave the Signe, at the appointed tyme. His Majesty put himself forward, but then too late found himself mistaken; he sticking fast between his breast and shoulders. ... I heard him groane, but could not come to help him."

However, his attempts proved fruitless and eventually he felt bound to advise the king to "take a boat and commit yourself to the mercy of the seas, where God will preserve you"; Charles did not take this advice.

Firebrace was one of the king's attendants at his execution on 30 January 1649, and thereafter he returned to serve Denbigh, who by that time had become a member of the post-civil war government, residing in Warwickshire. He was to remain there, settling in Stoke Golding, close by, for the next nine years.

== Service to Charles II ==
On the restoration of the monarchy in 1660, Firebrace sought a court position under Charles II having previously been commended as "a person very faithful and serviceable ... in his greatest extremities" by Charles I. He was appointed Third Clerk of the Kitchen of the Board of Green Cloth, promoted to Second Clerk in 1661 and Chief Clerk in 1667; in 1685 he rose to Clerk Comptroller and in 1688 to Clerk. For this service he was knighted some time before 2 April 1685 and retired c. 1688 at the age of 69.

== Death and legacy ==
Firebrace married three times; in 1645 he married Elizabeth Dowell, of Stoke Golding, Leicestershire, with whom he had five children, four of whom survived infancy; their second son Basil (b. 1652) later became the first of the Firebrace baronets; his daughter Hester married Basil Feilding, 4th Earl of Denbigh. Elizabeth died in June 1659 and in 1664 Firebrace married Alice Bagnall, daughter of a Gentleman Usher of the Court, and in 1685 Mary Sergeant, daughter of the Keeper of the Royal Wine Cellar. His first marriage was the only one to produce known issue.

Firebrace died on 27 January 1691 and is buried in Stoke Golding; he had become wealthy and the local church, to which he bequeathed some valuable items of communion plate, contains a marble monument to him.

The poet W. H. Auden was a distant descendant of Firebrace.

== See also ==
- Firebrace baronets
- William Levett
