= Edward Montagu (1672–1710) =

English politician

Edward Montagu (1672–1710) was an English politician, elected as Member of Parliament for Chippenham in 1698. His kinsman Alexander Popham, one of the two Chippenham Members since 1690, in 1698 stood instead in Bath, making way for Montagu.

Parliament of England
Preceded by Walter White; Alexander Popham	Member of Parliament for Chippenham; 1698–1700; With: Walter White	Succeeded by Walter White; Viscount Mordaunt
