= William Darrell of Littlecote =

Member of the Parliament of England (1539 – 1589)

William Darrell (23 June 1539 – 1 October 1589) of Littlecote House, Wiltshire, later of Warwick Lane, London; was an English Member of Parliament for the constituency of Downton in 1572.

== Biography ==
Darrell was the son of Sir Edward Darrell and his wife, Elizabeth, who was the daughter of Sir Thomas Essex of Berkshire. He served as Member of Parliament for the constituency of Downton in 1572. During the Spanish Armada crisis, Darrell offered his services, with twenty horsemen, to Sir Francis Walsingham.

John Aubrey recounts how, in 1577, a serving woman of the Darrells' household (at Littlecote in Wiltshire) was delivered of an illegitimate child and immediately upon its birth Darrell, the father, was handed the infant and cast it into the fireplace outside of the bedroom. The midwife, who did not know where she had been brought, afterwards succeeded in identifying the house and the room and Darrell was convicted of murder. The trial judge, Sir John Popham, took a huge bribe to stay sentence. Notwithstanding Aubrey's proven fondness for gossip, the subsequent discovery of some contemporary accounts seem to prove the tale true.

He died on 1 October 1589, aged 50, and is commemorated by a memorial window in the church of St Mary, Kintbury, Berkshire. He was survived by his brother, Thomas.

== See also ==
- Littlecote House § Wild William Darrell
