= Francis Popham (1573–1644) =

English soldier and landowner

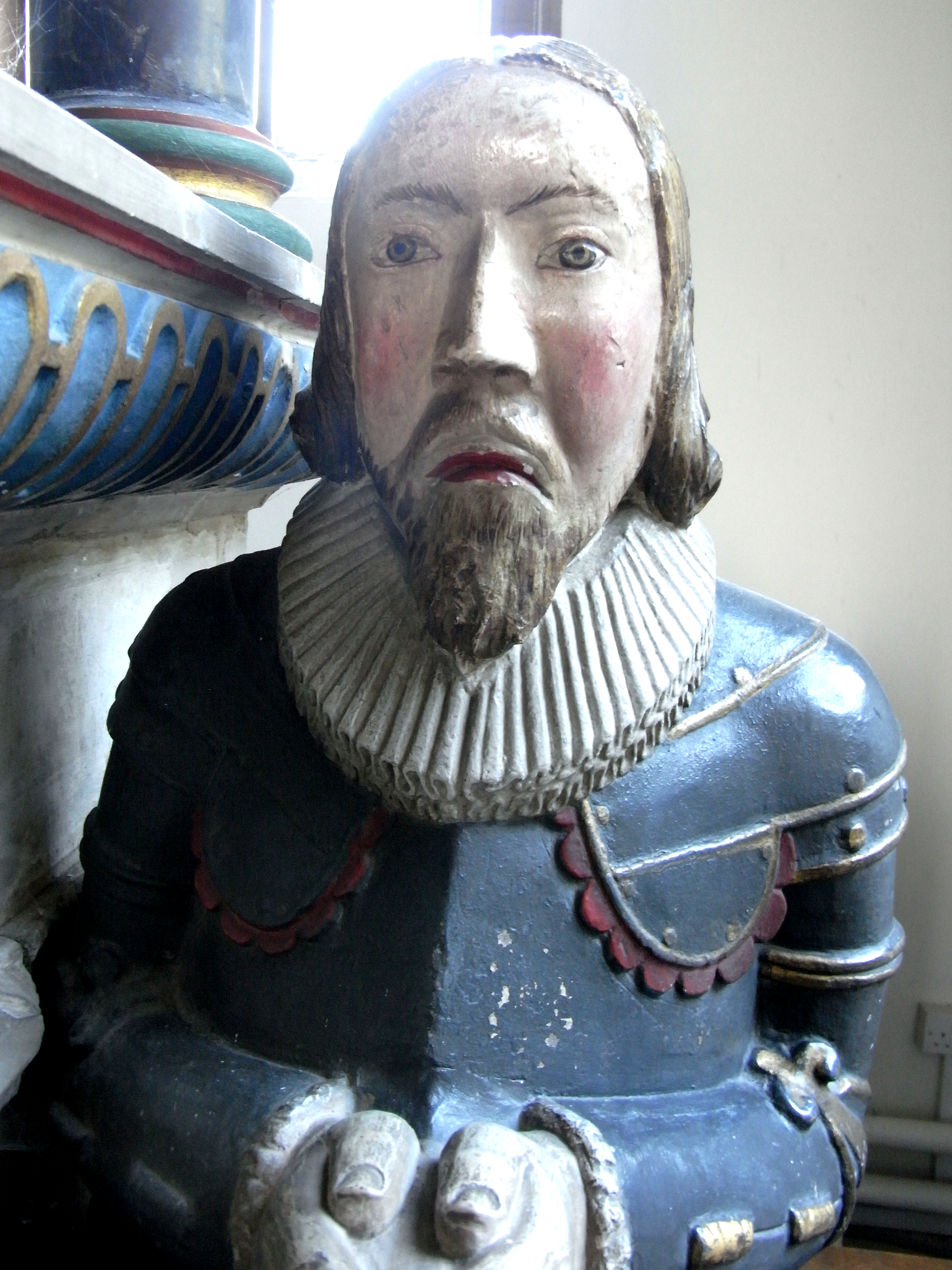
Sir Francis Popham shown as a young man aged 34, kneeling effigy in Wellington Church, Somerset, at east end of 1607 monument to his father Sir John Popham (1531–1607), Lord Chief Justice of England

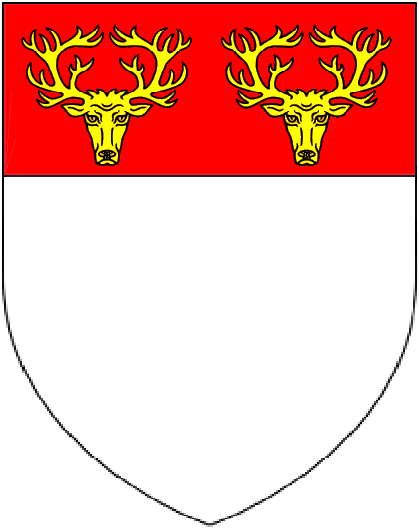
Arms of Popham: Argent, on a chief gules two stag's heads cabossed or

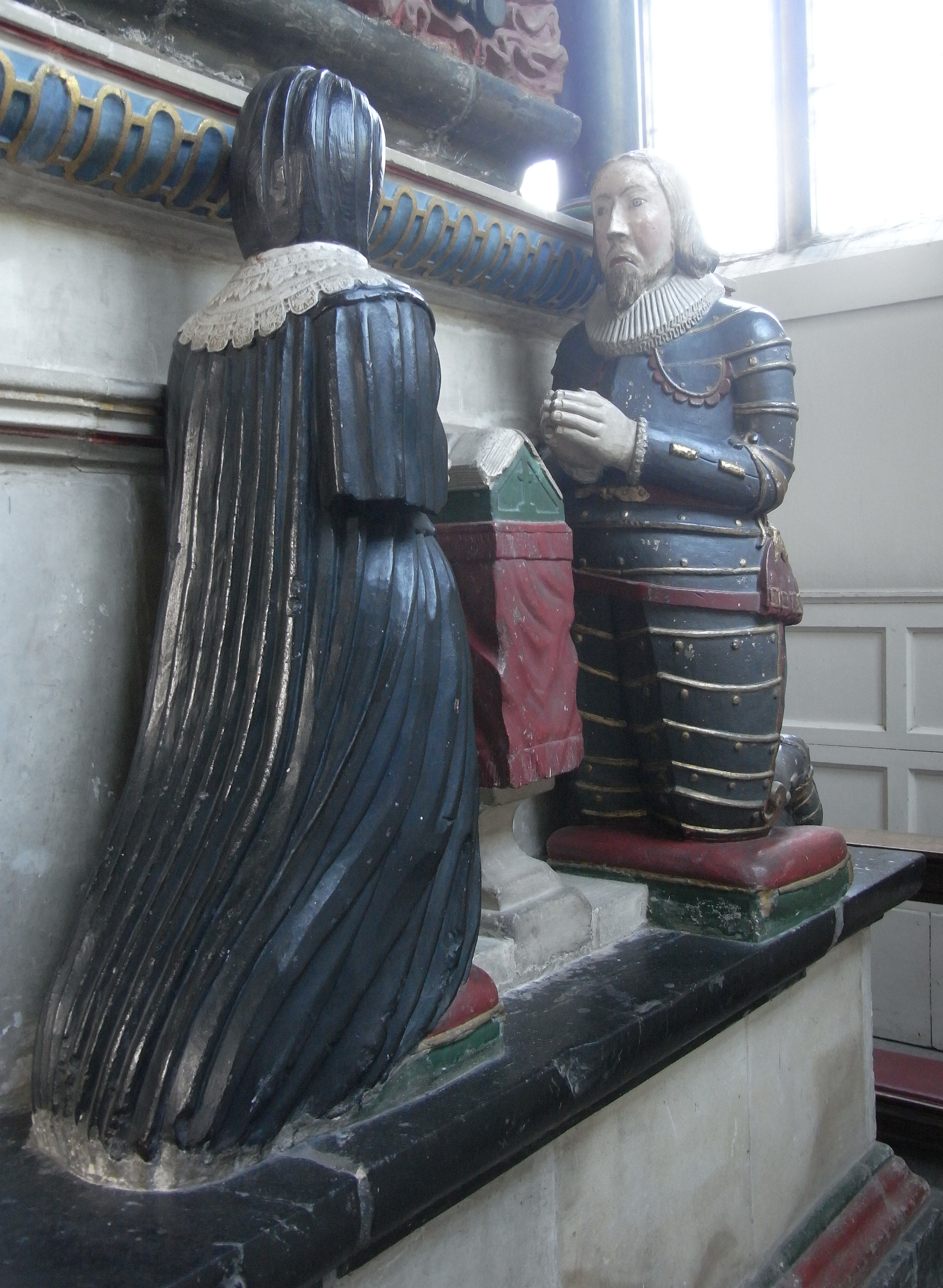
Sir Francis Popham and his wife Anne Dudley, effigies at east end of 1607 monument to his father Sir John Popham

Sir Francis Popham (1573–1644) of Wellington, Somerset, was an English soldier and landowner who was elected a Member of Parliament nine times, namely for Somerset (1597), Wiltshire (1604), Marlborough (1614), Great Bedwin (1621), Chippenham 1624, 1625, 1626, 1628–29), and for Minehead (1640–1644).

== Origins ==
Popham was the only son of Sir John Popham (1531–1607), of Wellington, Somerset and Littlecote, Berkshire (now Wiltshire), Speaker of the House of Commons, Attorney General and Lord Chief Justice of England, by his wife Amy Adams, daughter of Hugh Adams of Castleton, St Athan, Glamorgan.

== Career ==
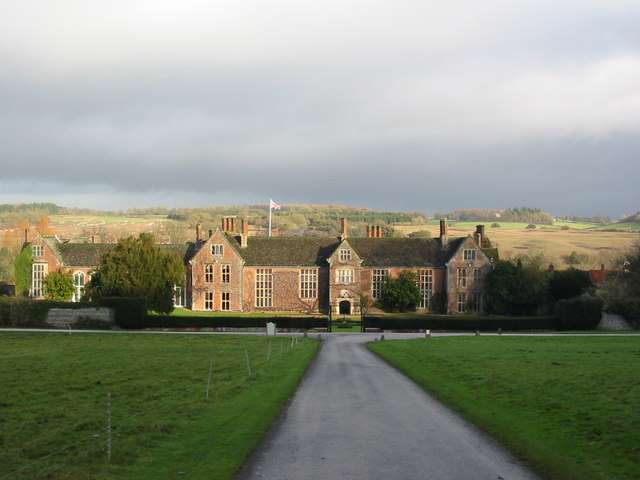
Littlecote House, Berkshire (now in Wiltshire), seat of Sir Francis Popham, who also lived at Wellington House, demolished in 1645 during the Civil War

He matriculated at Balliol College, Oxford, on 17 May 1588 at the age of 15, and entered the Middle Temple in 1589. As a soldier he served under Robert Devereux, 2nd Earl of Essex (1566–1601) in Spain and was knighted by him at Cádiz in June 1596.

In 1597 Popham was elected Member of Parliament for Somerset. He was a JP for Wiltshire from 1597 and for Somerset by 1602. He was also Deputy Lieutenant for both counties. In 1603 he was made Knight of the Bath. He was elected MP for Wiltshire in 1604. In 1607 he succeeded to the estates of Littlecote on the death of his father. He became constable of Taunton Castle in 1613. In 1614 he was elected MP for Marlborough and in 1621, MP for Great Bedwin. He was elected MP for Chippenham at a by-election in 1624 and was re-elected for the same seat in 1625, 1626 and 1628. He sat until 1629 when King Charles dispensed with parliament for eleven years.

In November 1640, due to the influence of his son-in-law Thomas Luttrell (1583–1644) of Dunster Castle, Somerset, Popham was elected MP for the Luttrell pocket borough of Minehead in the Long Parliament and sat until his death.

Popham was considered to have inherited his father's grasping disposition. He was constantly involved in lawsuits, which he was charged with conducting in a vexatious manner. Like his father, he took an active interest in the settlement of the North American colonies of Virginia and New England, and was a member of council of both colonies.

== Marriage and children ==
Popham married Anne Dudley, daughter and heiress of John Dudley (1569–1645), second son of Edward Sutton, 4th Baron Dudley of Dudley Castle, Staffordshire, by his second wife Jane Stanley, daughter of Edward Stanley, 3rd Earl of Derby. However, Popham's wife is also described as a daughter of John Dudley of Yanwath and an heiress of Thomas Sutton, founder of the Charterhouse.

By his wife he had four sons and seven daughters, including;

- John Popham (died 1638), MP
- Alexander Popham, MP
- Edward Popham, a General at Sea during the English Civil War
- Jane Popham (died 1668), wife of Thomas Luttrell (1583–1644), MP, of Dunster Castle, Somerset
- Frances Popham, wife of The Viscount Conway and mother of the Earl of Conway
- Amy Popham, wife of William Borlase and mother of Sir John Borlase, 1st Baronet

== Death and burial ==
Popham died in 1644 and was buried at Stoke Newington on 15 August 1644, but in March 1647 was moved to Bristol.

Parliament of England
Preceded by (Sir) Francis Hastings; Edward Dyer	Member of Parliament for Somerset; 1597; With: Sir Hugh Portman	Succeeded by (Sir) Edward Phelips; Sir Maurice Berkeley
Preceded by Edmund Carey; Sir Edward Hungerford	Member of Parliament for Wiltshire; 1604; With: John Thynne 1604 ? 1604–1611	Succeeded by Sir Thomas Howard; Sir Henry Poole
Preceded by Lawrence Hyde; Richard Digges	Member of Parliament for Marlborough; 1614; With: Richard Digges	Succeeded by William Seymour, Lord Beauchamp; Richard Digges
Preceded by Robert Hyde; Sir Giles Mompesson	Member of Parliament for Great Bedwyn; 1621–1622; With: Sir Giles Mompesson	Succeeded by Hugh Crompton; William Cholmley
Preceded by Sir John Maynard; Charles Maynard	Member of Parliament for Chippenham; 1624–1629; With: Sir John Maynard 1624–25; Sir Edward Bayntun 1626; Sir John Eyres 1628–29	Parliament suspended until 1640
Preceded by Francis Wyndham; Dr Arthur Duck	Member of Parliament for Minehead; 1640–1644; With: Alexander Luttrell; Thomas Hanham	Succeeded by Walter Strickland; Edward Popham
