= Littlecote House =

Country house in Wiltshire, England

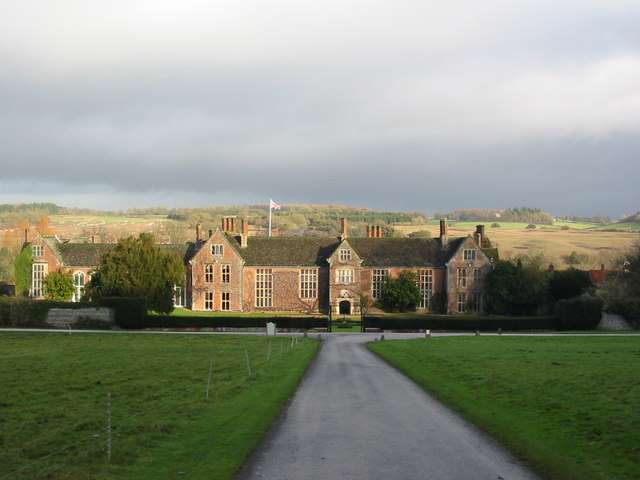

- Location within Wiltshire

General information
- Architectural style: Elizabethan mansion
- Location: Chilton Foliat, Wiltshire, United Kingdom
- Coordinates: 51.4315°N 1.5632°W
- Completed: 1592
- Client: John Popham

Littlecote House is a large Elizabethan country house and estate in the civil parishes of Ramsbury and Chilton Foliat, in the English county of Wiltshire, about 2 1/2 miles (4 km) northeast of the Berkshire town of Hungerford. The estate includes 34 hectares of historic parklands and gardens, including a walled garden dating from the 17th and 18th centuries. In its grounds is Littlecote Roman Villa.

A Grade I listed building, Littlecote House is now a hotel and leisure centre.

== History ==
=== Early house ===
The first Littlecote House was built during the 13th century and was the home of the de Calstone family from around 1290. In 1415 Elizabeth de Calstone married William Darrell and the Darrell family inherited the estate.

Elizabeth Darrell's half-niece, also named Elizabeth Darrell, was a maid of honour to Henry VIII's first queen Catherine of Aragon and had a well-publicised affair with the poet Sir Thomas Wyatt.

=== 16th century ===
In the mid-1530s, King Henry VIII is said to have courted his third wife Jane Seymour at Littlecote; the reason seems to be that Jane's grandmother was Elizabeth Darrell.

The last of the Darrell owners is connected with several scandals and the house's resident ghost story. William Darrell's father had left the house to his mistress Mary Danyell, but Darrell was able to recover it when he came of age in 1560. He spent lavishly, left his debts unpaid, and went to law with most of his neighbours, acquiring enemies in the process. Sir John Popham was his relative and lawyer.

Darrell had an affair with Anne Hungerford, the wife of Sir Walter Hungerford (Knight of Farley), his neighbour; when Sir Walter sued for divorce, she was acquitted and Sir Walter was sent to prison. Some years later, Mother Barnes, a midwife from Great Shefford, recalled being brought in 1575 to the childbed of a lady, with a gentleman standing by who commanded her to save the life of the mother, but who (as soon as the child was born) threw it into the fire. Barnes did not name or indicate either Darrell or Littlecote, but his enemies quickly ascribed this murder to him.

Darrell's financial troubles increased, and he mortgaged Littlecote, first to Sir Thomas Bromley, and then to Popham. He moved to London and spent some time in a debtors' prison, but died suddenly in 1589 on a visit to Littlecote. Legend has it that whilst hunting, the ghost of the murdered newborn appeared to him, causing his horse to shy and throw him. Darrell is said to haunt the site of his death, known as Darrell's stile (or Style, as well as the church at Ramsbury, two miles away), although one famed clairvoyant, Tom Corbett, detected nothing of the sort. But he reported to the author Peter Underwood that he did see "a ghost in the garden, a beautiful woman whom he later recognised from a portrait in the house as Mrs Leyborne Popham", and another ghost in the Chinese bedroom he termed a "busybody", a word Mrs. Wills, wife of the then owner Major George Wills, agreed described the presence in that room. Another possible ghost is that of a past tenant, Gerard Lee Bevan, who lived at Littlecote after World War I and later served time for embezzlement. His presence has been felt in the Long Gallery.

John Aubrey tells that Littlecote was a bribe to Popham as his judge in a criminal case, which is impossible: Darrell was not charged or tried, and Popham was not yet a judge. Nevertheless, this story was borrowed by Sir Walter Scott, in Rokeby, and by Charles Dickens, in A Tale of Two Cities.

=== The present house ===
Sir John Popham bought the reversion of Littlecote, and succeeded to it on Darrell's death in 1589; he then built the present Elizabethan brick mansion, which was completed in 1592.

James I, Charles II, and William of Orange stayed there, the latter on his march from Torbay to London in the so-called "Glorious Revolution" of 1688 in which he superseded the Catholic King James II.

A unique room that can still be seen today is the so-called "Dutch Parlour". A plaque in the corridor outside states that this was decorated with paintings by Dutch seamen who were captured in about 1666 in a war between England and the Dutch; these paintings cover the walls and the ceiling.

Paintings in the "Dutch Parlour"
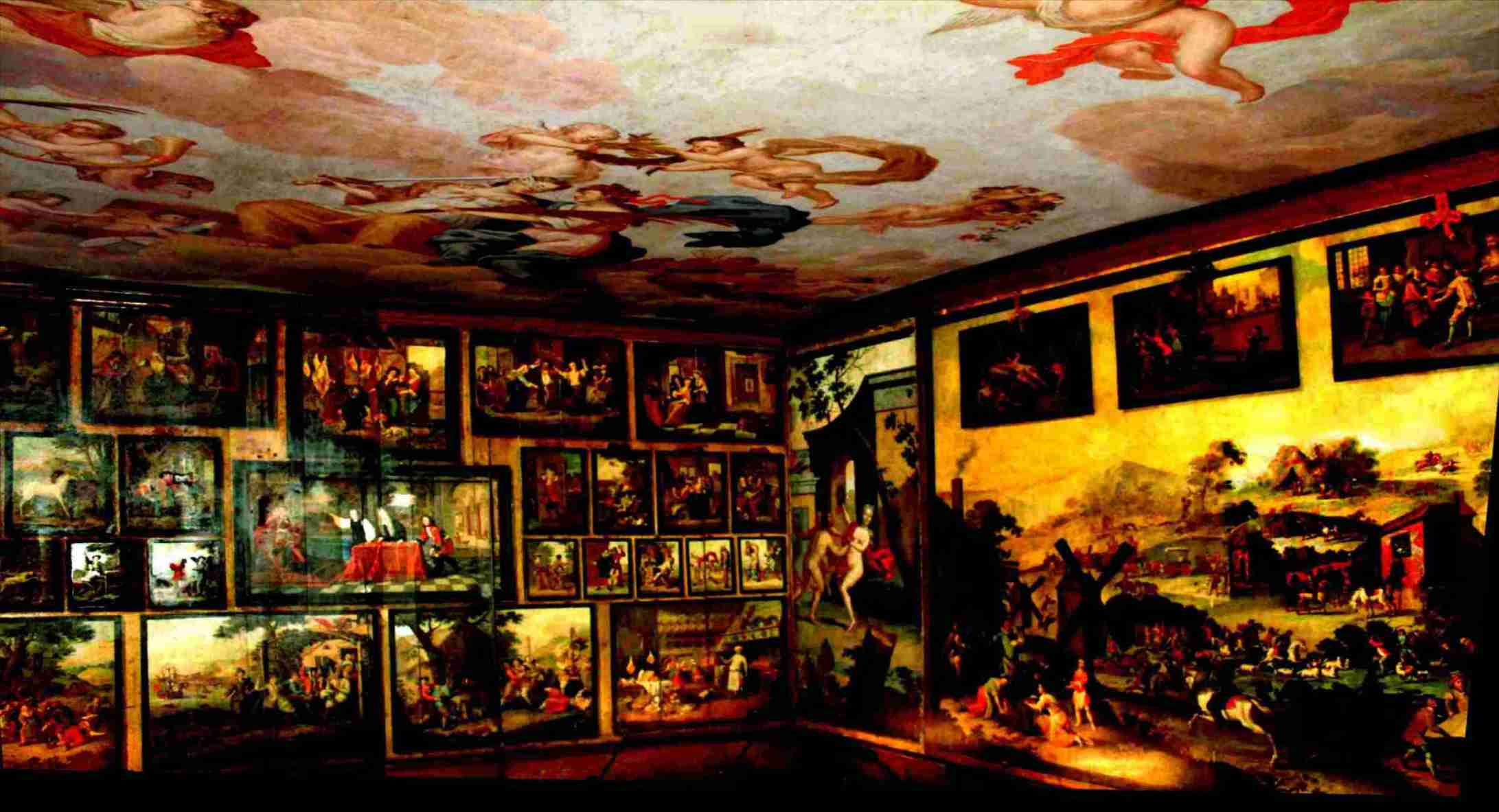
Walls and ceiling

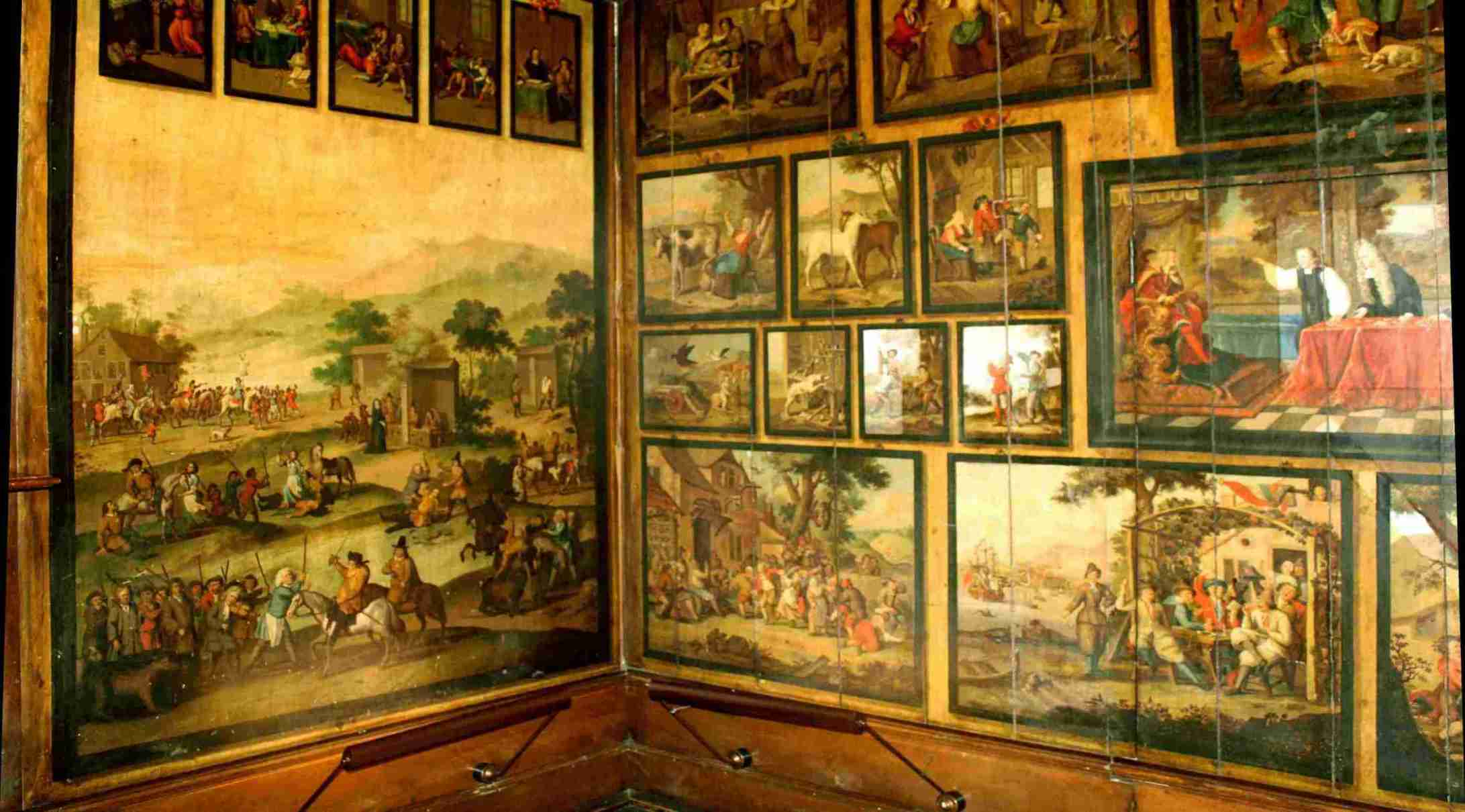
A corner

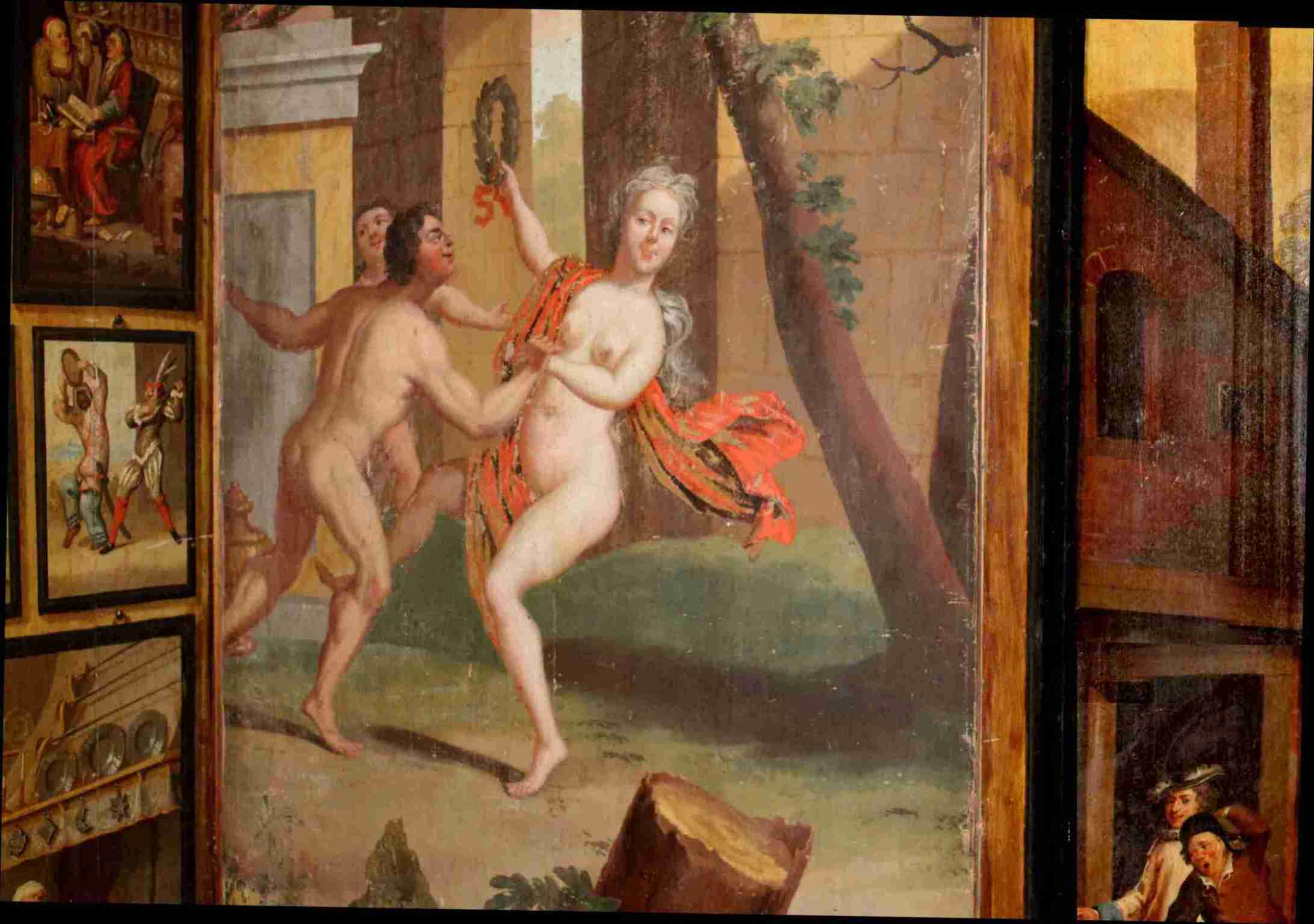
Detail

The Popham family owned the estate until 1805. In the mid-1600s the family played a role in the history of deaf education in which John Wallis and William Holder taught Sir John's great-grandson, Alexander Popham (born 1648), to overcome his disability and be able to speak. Sir John (1531–1600) was Speaker of the House of Commons, and five of his descendants were also Members of Parliament: Sir Francis (1573–1644; elected on nine occasions), John (1603–c.1638), Alexander (1605–1669), Sir Francis (1646–1674), and Alexander (c.1670–1705).

In 1805 the family name became Leyborne Popham, under whom much of the house was refurbished in 1810. The Leyborne Popham family owned the estate until 1929, when it was purchased by Sir Ernest Salter Wills Bt, who was a member of the well-known Wills tobacco dynasty founded by Henry Overton Wills I as W.D. & H.O. Wills Ltd, in 1787. Sir Ernest was a major shareholder and a director of the Imperial Tobacco company, which also owned the nearby Ramsbury Manor.

=== Second World War ===
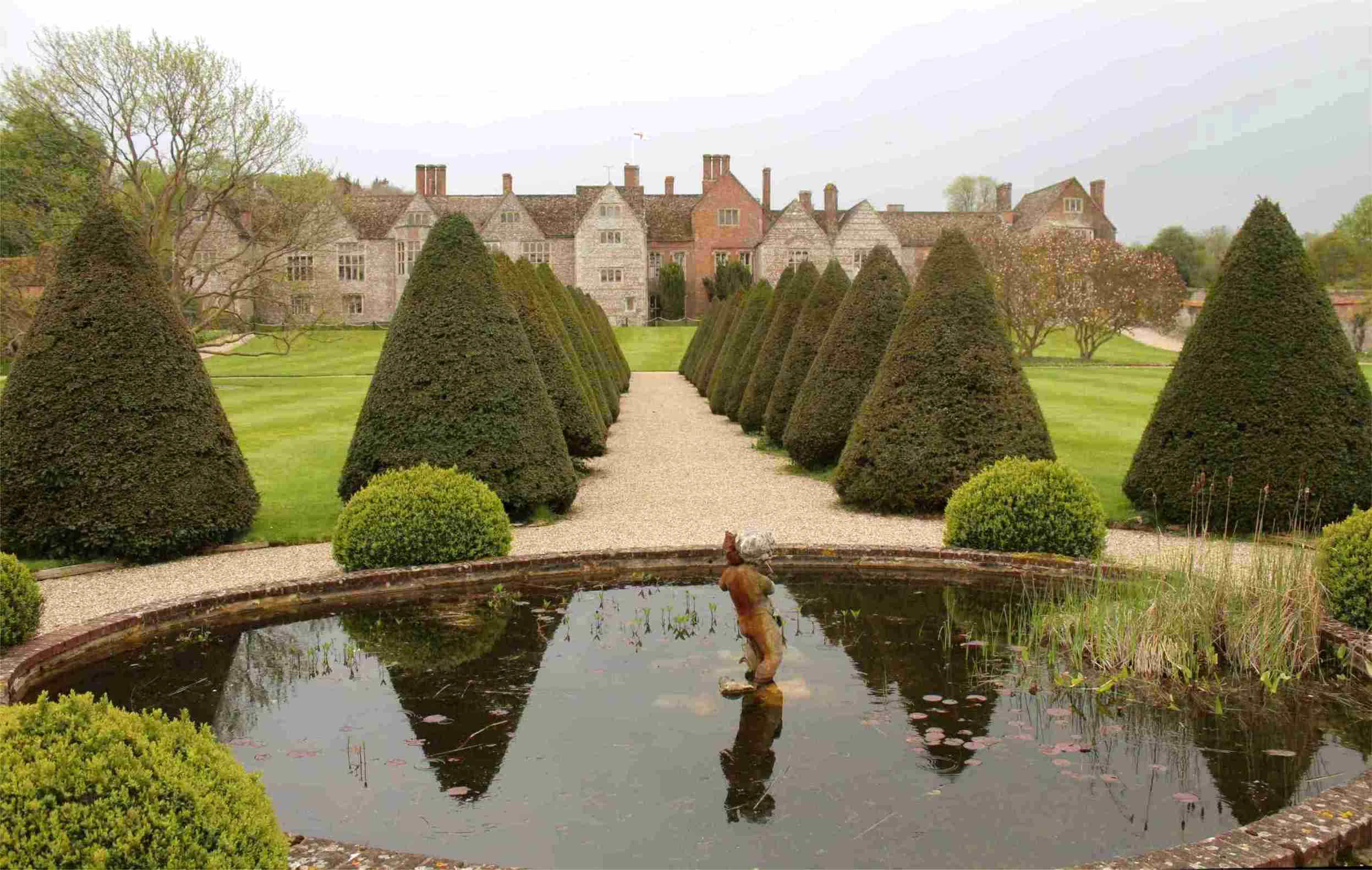
Pond and avenue of trees, north of the main house

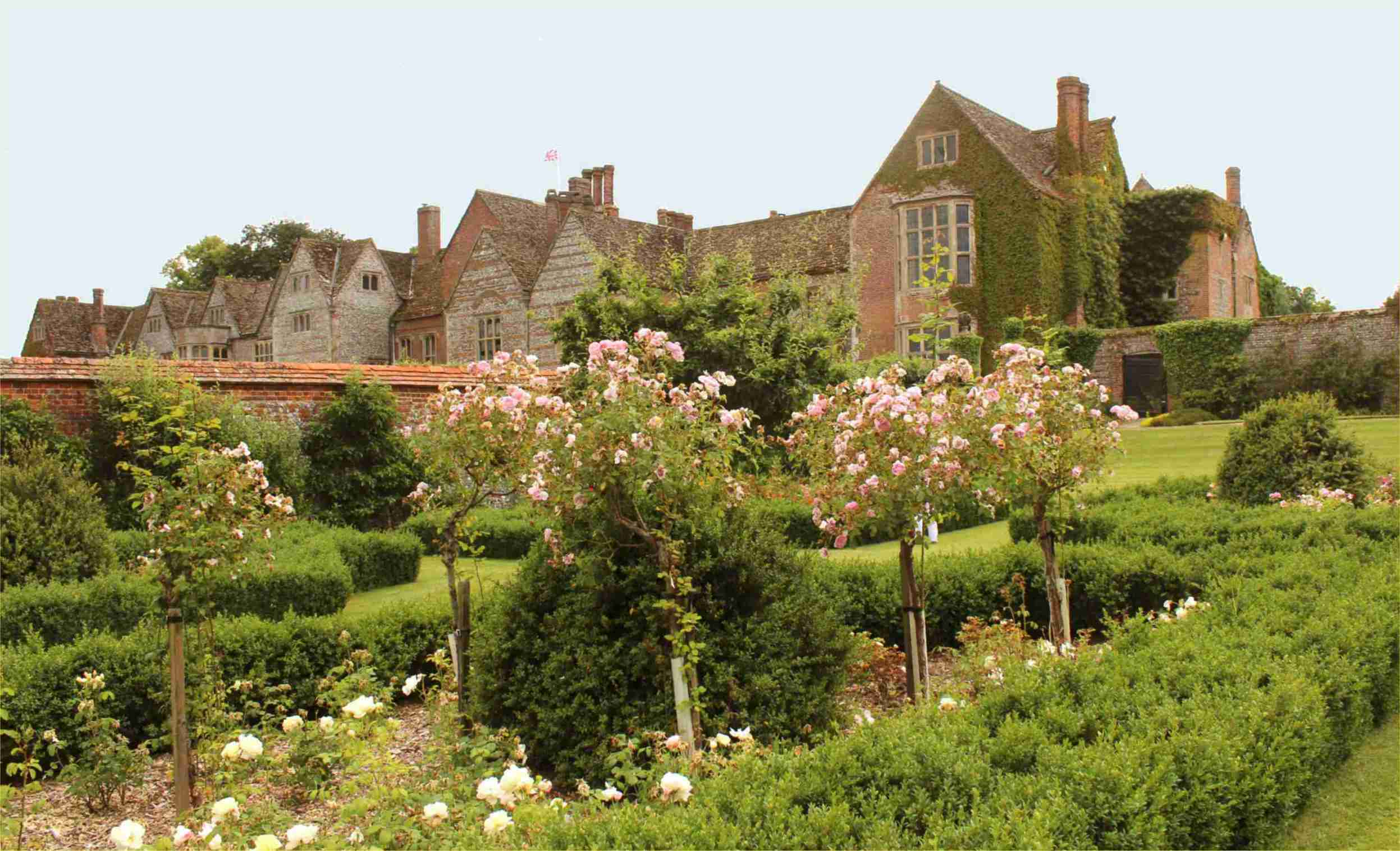
Rose garden NW of main house

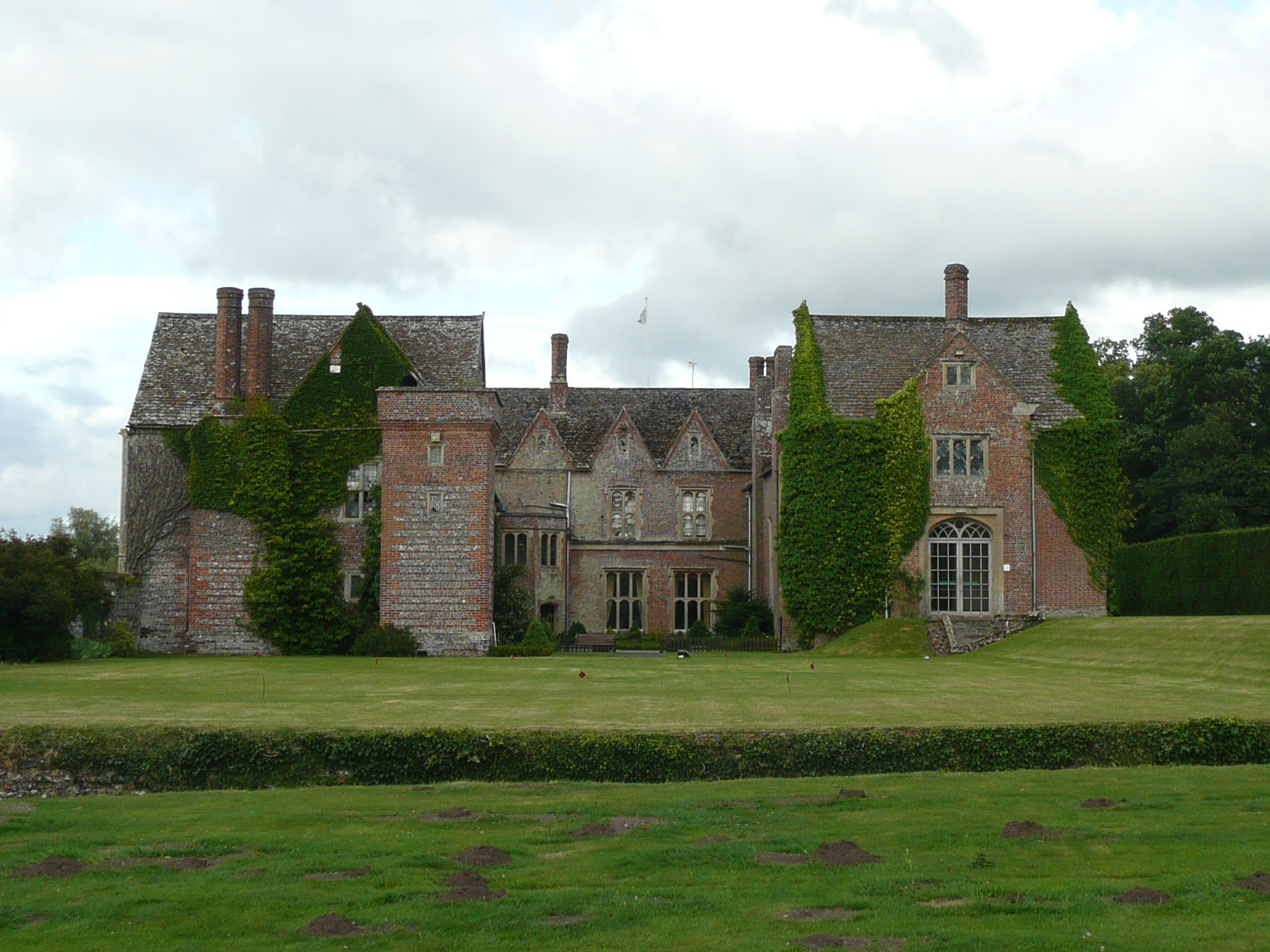
The west end of the main house

During the Second World War, the house was requisitioned by the Government for use by the military.

In 1942-43 the house was the headquarters of the 34th Army Tank Brigade, 34th Armoured Brigade (United Kingdom) commanded by Brigadier Noel Tetley.

In September 1943, the US 101st Airborne Division took over part of the house, and it became home to regimental staff, regimental headquarters company, and headquarters company of the 1st Battalion, 506th Parachute Infantry Regiment. The house provided office space and sleeping quarters for officers of the 506th, with the best rooms being allocated to Col. Robert F. Sink, regimental commander, and Lt. Col. Charles H. Chase, his executive officer. The colonel used the library as his office, and a memorial plaque can be seen today in this room.

From airfields in this area, including Ramsbury just to the west, the Airborne Division took off during the night of 5/6 June 1944 as part of the invasion of Normandy. Easy Company from this regiment have become famous through the book and TV mini-series Band of Brothers. All other ranks lived in Nissen huts built alongside the main drive between the house and the east lodge.

During the Second World War (and during Sir Ernest Wills's tenure as HM's Lord Lieutenant for the County of Wiltshire, 1930–1942) King George VI paid a visit to Littlecote in 1943. The King was acquainted with Sir Ernest since his great nephew, Major John Lycett Wills of the Lifeguards, had married King George's niece, the Hon. Jean Constance Elphinstone.

=== Post-War ===
After the war, ownership reverted to the Wills family. Sir Ernest's younger son, Major George Seton Wills, inherited the estate in 1958 and gifted it to his only son and heir, David Seton Wills, in 1966. Following the latter's succession to the Baronetcy in 1983, he sold the house to the entrepreneur Peter de Savary in 1985. In the same year, the house's collection of Civil War weaponry and armour – begun by Parliamentary colonel Alexander Popham – was offered for auction, and bought in its entirety by Royal Armouries.

In 1996 De Savary sold the estate to Warner Holidays, who now operate it as a country house hotel and resort.

== Littlecote Roman Villa ==
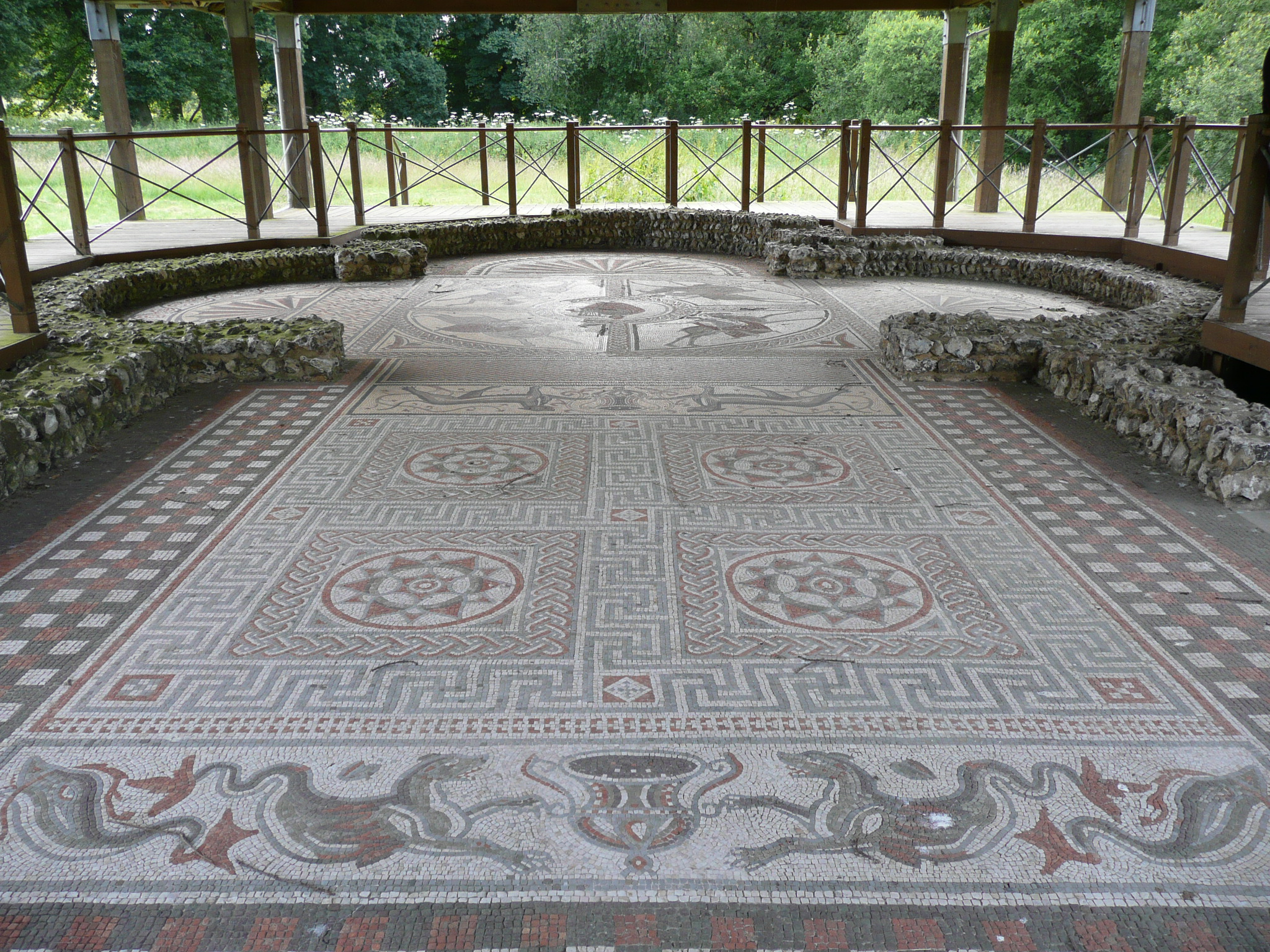
The Orpheus mosaic at the villa

In the grounds is Littlecote Roman Villa, a Roman winged corridor villa and associated religious complex. It has been excavated under the direction of Bryn Walters, and is on display to the public.

== Location ==
Littlecote House is on the south bank of the River Kennet between the villages of Ramsbury and Chilton Foliat, and about two miles northwest of the small Berkshire town of Hungerford. It is also in the heart of the North Wessex Downs Area of Outstanding Natural Beauty.

Position: grid reference SU303703

Nearby places of interest: Crofton Pumping Station, Wilton Windmill

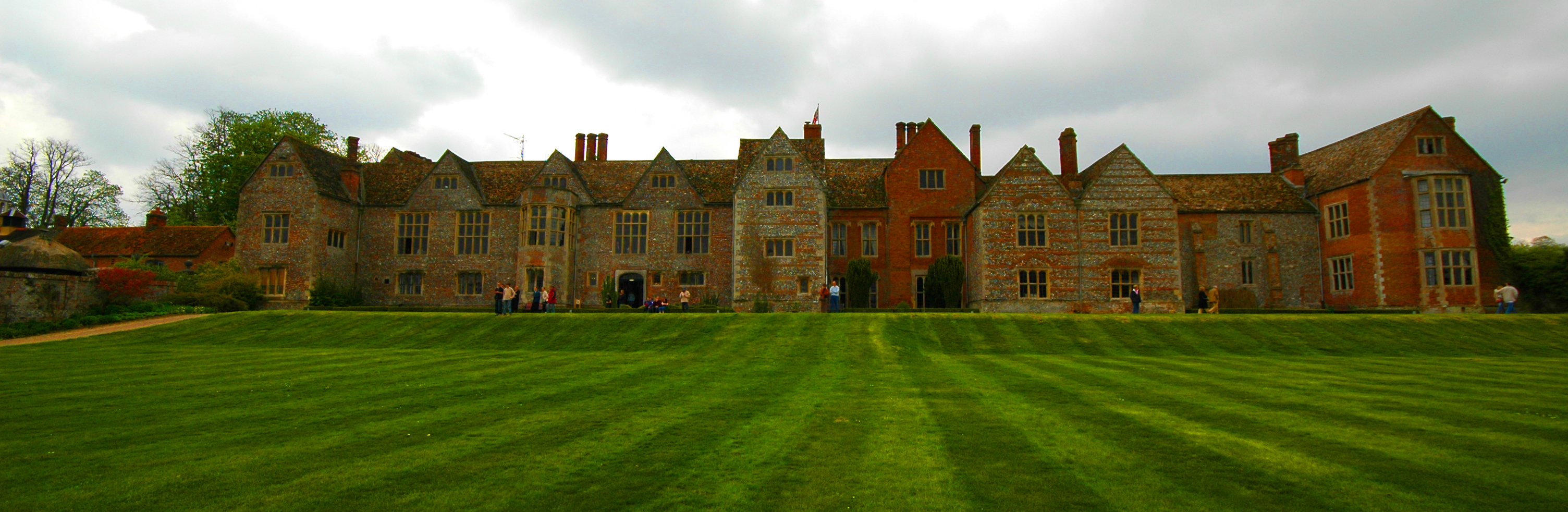
A panorama of Littlecote House from the north
