= Clerk of the Green Cloth =

Position in British Royal Household

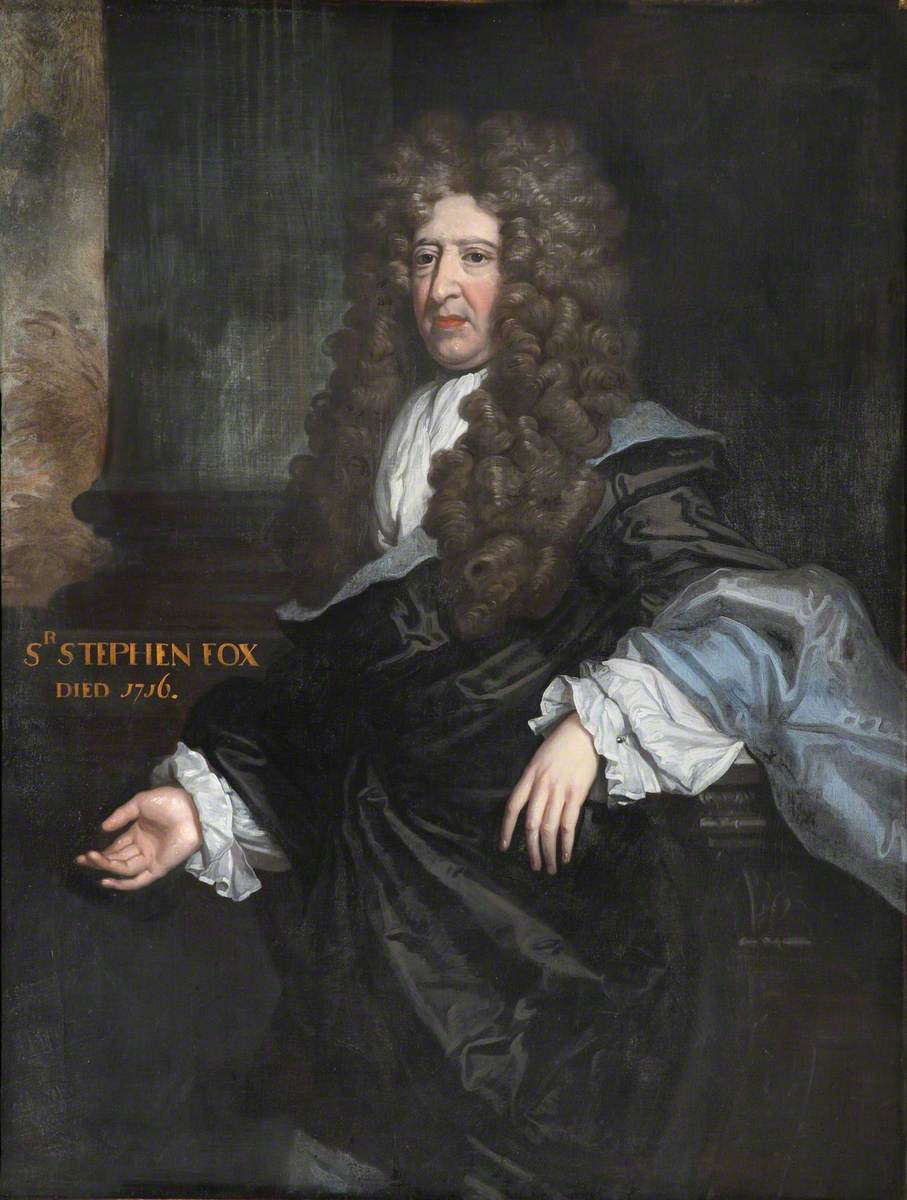
Sir Stephen Fox worked at the Clerk of the Green Cloth for almost 30 years, his last 18 as First Clerk.

The Clerk of the Green Cloth was a position in the British Royal Household. The clerk acted as secretary of the Board of Green Cloth, and was therefore responsible for organising royal journeys and assisting in the administration of the Royal Household. From the Restoration, there were four clerks (two clerks and two clerks comptrollers). Two additional clerks comptrollers were added in 1761, but one of these was redesignated a clerk in 1762.

== Remuneration ==
Each clerk had a salary of £500, with lodgings, diet, fees on the signing of contracts and ancient rights of 'Wast, Command and Remaines', i.e., leftover provisions, which was replaced with an allowance of £438 in 1701, increased to £518 in 1761 (making a total of £1018). Each clerk had a clerk or writer, who was paid £50 with other fees and allowances, fixed at £150 in 1761 and converted to a salary of £180 in 1769. The offices were all abolished by statute, the Civil List and Secret Service Money Act 1782 (22 Geo. 3. c. 82), in 1782.

== Duties ==
'All Bills of Comptrolments, &c. relating to the Office, are allotted and allow'd by the Clerks Comptrollers, and summ'd up and Audited by the Clerks of the Green-Cloth'. They also sat with the other officers as part of the board.

== List of Clerks ==
Data from 'The household below stairs: Clerks of the Green Cloth 1660-1782', Office-Holders in Modern Britain: Volume 11 (revised): Court Officers, 1660-1837 (2006), pp. 403–40.British History online.

The position was held by a number of people including George Stonhouse during the 16th century, though it later became disused.

=== 1660–1761 ===
Date	First Clerk	Second Clerk	First Clerk Comptroller	Second Clerk Comptroller
25 June 1660	Sir Robert Fenn	John Crane	Sir Henry Wood	Sir Stephen Fox
22 August 1660	John Crane	Sir Henry Wood	Sir Stephen Fox	George Barker
14 January 1661	Sir Henry Wood	Sir Stephen Fox	George Barker	William Boreman
13 September 1664	Sir Henry Wood	Sir Stephen Fox	William Boreman	Sir Winston Churchill
26 May 1671	Sir Stephen Fox	Sir William Boreman	Sir Winston Churchill	John Trethewy
26 June 1671	Sir Stephen Fox	Sir William Boreman	Sir Winston Churchill	Sir Richard Mason
14 March 1685	Sir Stephen Fox	Sir William Boreman	Sir Winston Churchill	Sir Henry Firebrace
12 July 1686	Sir Stephen Fox	Sir Winston Churchill	Sir Henry Firebrace	Sir John Sparrow
10 April 1688	Sir Stephen Fox	Sir Henry Firebrace	Sir John Sparrow	Thomas Morley
21 February 1689	Sir Stephen Fox	William Forester	James Forbes	Peter Isaac
12/13 April 1689	Sir William Forester	Sir James Forbes	Peter Isaac	John Fox
22 January 1690	Sir William Forester	Sir James Forbes	Peter Isaac	Thomas Vivian
September 1691	Sir William Forester	Sir James Forbes	Peter Isaac	Charles Issac
1 April 1693	Sir William Forester	Sir James Forbes	Charles Issac	Anthony Rowe
16/20 April 1702	Sir William Forester	Anthony Rowe	Charles Scarburgh	Edward Griffith
25 September 1704	Sir William Forester	Charles Scarburgh	Edward Griffith	vacant
1 October 1704	Sir William Forester	Charles Scarburgh	Edward Griffith	Charles Godfrey
18 February 1711	Sir William Forester	Charles Scarburgh	Charles Godfrey	Sir John Walter
21 October 1714	Sir William Forester	Charles Godfrey	Sir John Walter	John Charlton
1 March 1715	Sir William Forester	Sir John Walter	John Charlton	Robert Wroth
17 February 1716	Sir William Forester	John Charlton	Robert Wroth	William Feilding
15 April 1717	John Charlton	Robert Wroth	William Feilding	William Coventry
20 February 1720	John Charlton	William Feilding	Sir Robert Corbet	William Coventry
17 March 1720	William Feilding	Sir Robert Corbet	Giles Earle	Robert Bristow
10 April 1724	Sir Robert Corbet	Giles Earle	Robert Bristow	Richard Sutton
26 July 1727	Sir Thomas Reade	Sir Thomas Wynn	Sir Thomas Hales	Robert Bristow
1738	Sir Thomas Reade	Sir Thomas Wynn	Sir Thomas Hales	Robert Bristow jnr
1740	Sir Thomas Reade	Sir Thomas Wynn	Sir Thomas Hales	Walter Carey
8 June 1749	Sir Thomas Reade	Sir Thomas Hales	Walter Carey	Sir Richard Wrottesley
20 November 1752	Sir Thomas Hales	Walter Carey	Sir Richard Wrottesley	Sir Francis Henry Drake
2 April 1754	Sir Thomas Hales	Walter Carey	Sir Francis Henry Drake	John Grey
6 May 1757	Sir Thomas Hales	Sir Francis Henry Drake	John Grey	Humphry Morice

=== 1761–1782 ===
Date	First Clerk	Second Clerk	First Clerk Comptroller	Second Clerk Comptroller	Third Clerk Comptroller	Fourth Clerk Comptroller
17 March 1761	Thomas Townshend	John Evelyn	Henry Bridgeman	Simon Fanshawe	Sir Francis Henry Drake	John Grey
Date	First Clerk	Second Clerk	Third Clerk	First Clerk Comptroller	Second Clerk Comptroller	Third Clerk Comptroller
24 December 1762	Sir John Evelyn	Henry Bridgeman	Simon Fanshawe	Sir Francis Henry Drake	John Grey	Henry Frederick Thynne
18 April 1764	Sir John Evelyn	Simon Fanshawe	Sir Francis Henry Drake	John Grey	Henry Frederick Thynne	Richard Vernon
1 August 1765	Sir John Evelyn	Simon Fanshawe	Sir Francis Henry Drake	John Grey	George Bridges Brudenell	Sir Alexander Gilmour
13 August 1767	Simon Fanshawe	Sir Francis Henry Drake	John Grey	George Bridges Brudenell	Sir Alexander Gilmour	Richard Hopkins
15 January 1768	Sir Francis Henry Drake	John Grey	George Bridges Brudenell	Sir Alexander Gilmour	Richard Hopkins	Richard Vernon
20 January 1771	John Grey	George Bridges Brudenell	Sir Alexander Gilmour	Richard Hopkins	Richard Vernon	Richard Savage Nassau
6 June 1777	George Bridges Brudenell	Sir Alexander Gilmour	Richard Hopkins	Richard Vernon	Richard Savage Nassau	Sir Ralph Payne
10 December 1777	George Bridges Brudenell	Sir Alexander Gilmour	Richard Vernon	Richard Savage Nassau	Sir Ralph Payne	Sir Richard Worsley
1 July 1779	George Bridges Brudenell	Richard Vernon	Richard Savage Nassau	Sir Ralph Payne	Sir Richard Worsley	Sir William Cunynghame
5 September 1780	George Bridges Brudenell	Richard Vernon	Sir Ralph Payne	Sir William Cunynghame	Sir William Gordon	Lovell Stanhope

In addition, several supernumerary clerks comptrollers were appointed in the 17th century:

- 31 August 1660: William Boreman
- 22 November 1670: John Trethewy
- 23 March 1674: Henry Firebrace
- 11 April 1688: John Fox
- 28 April 1691: Charles Isaac

In 1988, David Becket of Radley, Oxfordshire obtained Royal consent to revive the title as an honorary post.
