= Francis Popham (1646–1674) =

English politician

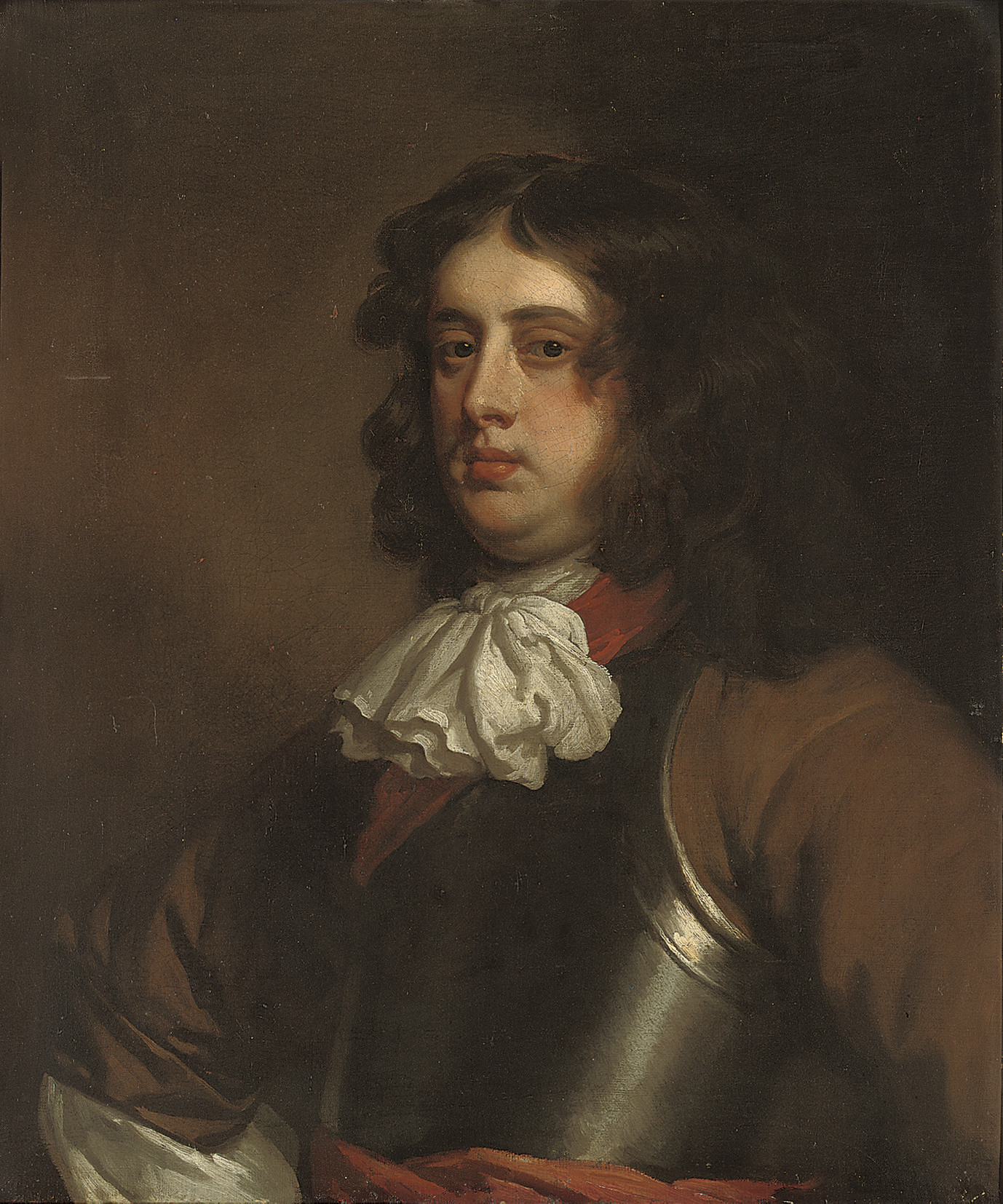
Sir Francis Popham of Littlecote, painting by Sir Peter Lely

Sir Francis Popham KB (1646–1674), of Littlecote House, Wiltshire and Houndstreet, Somerset, was an English politician.

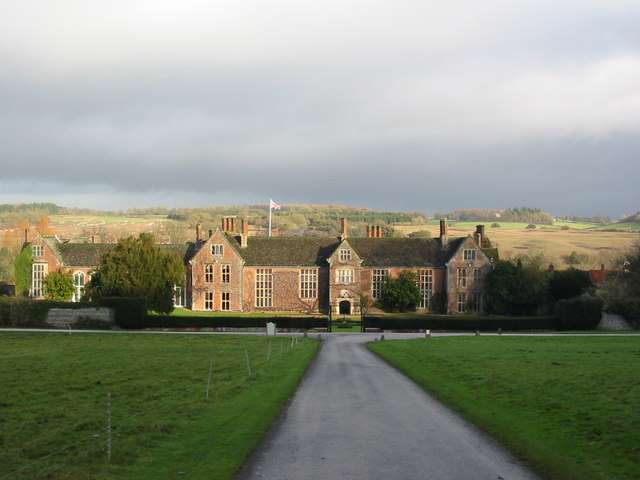
Littlecote House, Wiltshire

He was the eldest surviving son of Alexander Popham of Littlecote.

He was a member (MP) of the parliament of England for Bath from 1669 to 1674. He succeeded his father in 1669 and was made a Knight of the Bath the same year.

He married Helena, the daughter and heiress of Hugh Rogers of Cannington, Somerset and had a son, Alexander and a daughter.
