= Edward Popham =

English general at sea during the English Civil War (1610–1651)

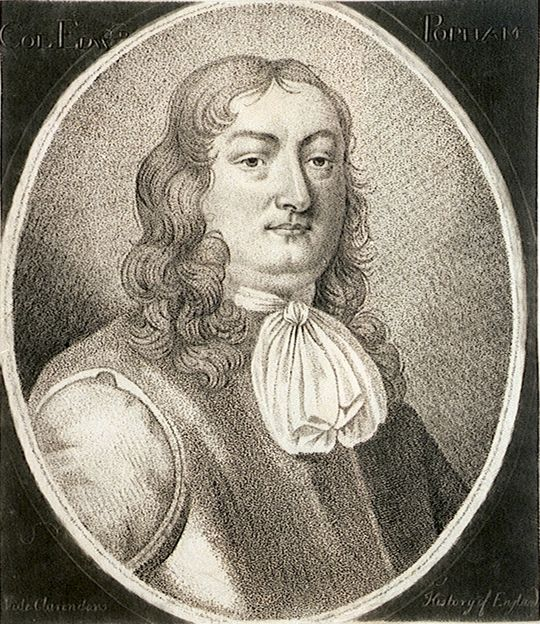
Edward Popham

Edward Popham (1610–1651) was a general at sea during the English Civil War.

Popham supported parliament in the English Civil War. He was elected M.P. for Minehead in 1644. He commanded a force in Somerset and Dorset. He was appointed a commissioner for the immediate ordering of the navy in 1648 and commanded in the Downs and North Sea during 1649. In 1650, he joined Robert Blake at Lisbon in blockading Prince Rupert.

== Biography ==
Popham, the fifth and youngest son of Sir Francis Popham, and his wife Anne (née Dudley), was probably born in about 1610. His brother, Alexander, the second son, was born in 1605. In 1627, Edward and Alexander Popham were outlawed for debt, their property being assigned to their creditors, but the age of even the elder of the brothers suggests that the debtors must have been other men of the same name, the Edward being possibly his cousin, the man who represented Bridgwater in parliament from 1620 to 1626.

In 1636, Edward Popham was lieutenant of Henrietta Maria in the fleet under the Algernon, Earl of Northumberland, and, in March 1637, was promoted to be captain of Fifth Whelp. The Whelps were by this time old and barely seaworthy; most of them had already disappeared, and in a fresh breeze off the coast of Holland, on 28 June 1637, this one, having sprung a leak, went down in the open sea, giving Popham and the ship's company barely time to save themselves in the boat. Seventeen men went down in her. After rowing for about 50 miles, they boarded an English ship which landed them at Rotterdam; thence they found their way to Helvoetsluys, where an English squadron of ships of war was lying. In 1639, Popham commanded a ship, possibly the Rainbow, in the fleet with Sir John Penington in the Downs, and was one of those who signed the narrative of occurrences sent to the Earl of Northumberland.

In the English Civil War, he joined the Parliamentary cause, of which his father and brother Alexander were members. On the death of his father, he succeeded him as member for Minehead. In 1642, he and his brother Hugh were with Alexander, then a deputy-lieutenant of Somerset, raising men for parliament. In May 1643, Colonel Popham commanded "a good strength of horse and foot" in Dorset, and relieved Dorchester, then threatened by Prince Maurice. This was probably Edward, as Alexander appears to have then been in Bristol. In June 1644, both Pophams were, with Ludlow and some others, detached by Sir William Waller into Somersetshire in order to raise recruits. It proved a service of some danger, as, with a body of about 200 horse, they had to pass through country held by the enemy. On 11 June 1645, he was desired to repair to Romsey, take command of the troops assembling there for the relief of Taunton, and follow the orders of Colonel Sir Edward Massey. On 17 June, Alexander was directed to command a party of horse to Romsey, there to receive orders from Edward. It would seem that at this time Edward was considered the superior officer. It is thus certain that he was not at the Battle of Naseby, but probable that he took part in the western campaign of July, and fought at Ilminster, Langport and Bridgewater. It is, however, curious that as a colonel, second in command to Massey, his name is not mentioned.

On 17 July 1648, he had instructions to accompany Robert, Earl of Warwick, the lord admiral to sea, the Charles, Prince of Wales having a squadron on the coast. Three days later, the orders were countermanded and Sir Walter Strickland was sent in his stead. On 24 February 1649, an act of parliament appointed Popham, Blake and Deane commissioners for the immediate ordering of the fleet, and on the 26th their relative precedence was settled as here given, the seniority being assigned to Popham on account, it may be presumed, of his rank and experience in the navy, independent of the fact that his brother Alexander was a member of the Council of State. Blake, too, had already served under one of the Pophams, apparently Edward, as lieutenant-colonel of his regiment, and it would seem not improbable that he was now appointed one of the commissioners for the fleet on Popham's suggestion.

During 1649, Popham commanded in the Downs and North Sea, where privateers of all nations, with letters of marque from the Prince of Wales, were preying on east coast merchant ships. On 23 August, the corporation of Yarmouth ordered three good sheep to be sent on board his ship, then in the roads, as a present from the town in recognition of his good service in convoying Yarmouth ships.

Early in 1650, he was under orders to join Blake at Lisbon with a strong reinforcement. An intercepted royalist letter dated 20 February has "Blake has gone to sea with fourteen sail. … A second fleet is preparing under Ned Popham. His brother Alexander undertakes to raise one regiment of horse, one of dragoons, and two of foot in the west; but good conditions, authentically offered, might persuade them both to do righteous things." With eight ships, Popham put to sea in the last days of April and, having joined Blake, the two were together on board the Resolution when, on 26 July, Rupert tried to escape out of the Tagus. The close watch kept by the parliamentary squadron compelled him to anchor under the guns of the castle, where, by reason of a strong easterly wind, the others could not come. Two days later, finding the attempt hopeless, he went back off Lisbon.

In November, Popham returned to England, and shortly afterwards resumed his station in the Downs in command of the ships in the North Sea. He died of fever at Dover, in actual command if not on board his ship, on 19 August 1651. The news reached London on the 22nd, and was reported to the house by Whitelocke. At the same time, Sir Henry Vane the younger was ordered "to go to Mrs. Popham from the council and condole with her on the loss of her husband, and to let her know what a memory they have of his services, and that they will upon all occasions be ready to show respect to his relations". A year's salary was granted to his widow Anne.

Popham was buried at the expense of the state in Westminster Abbey in Henry VII's chapel, where a monument in black and white marble was erected to his memory. At the Restoration, the body and the monument were removed, but, as Alexander Popham was still living and a member of parliament, the body was allowed to be taken away privately, and the monument to be placed in the chapel of St. John the Baptist, the inscription being, however, effaced and never being restored. His monument remains in the Abbey but the inscription was removed. (Note: A portrait by Cooper, belonging to Mr. F. Leyborne Popham, was on loan at South Kensington in 1868.(Laughton 1896, p. 143))

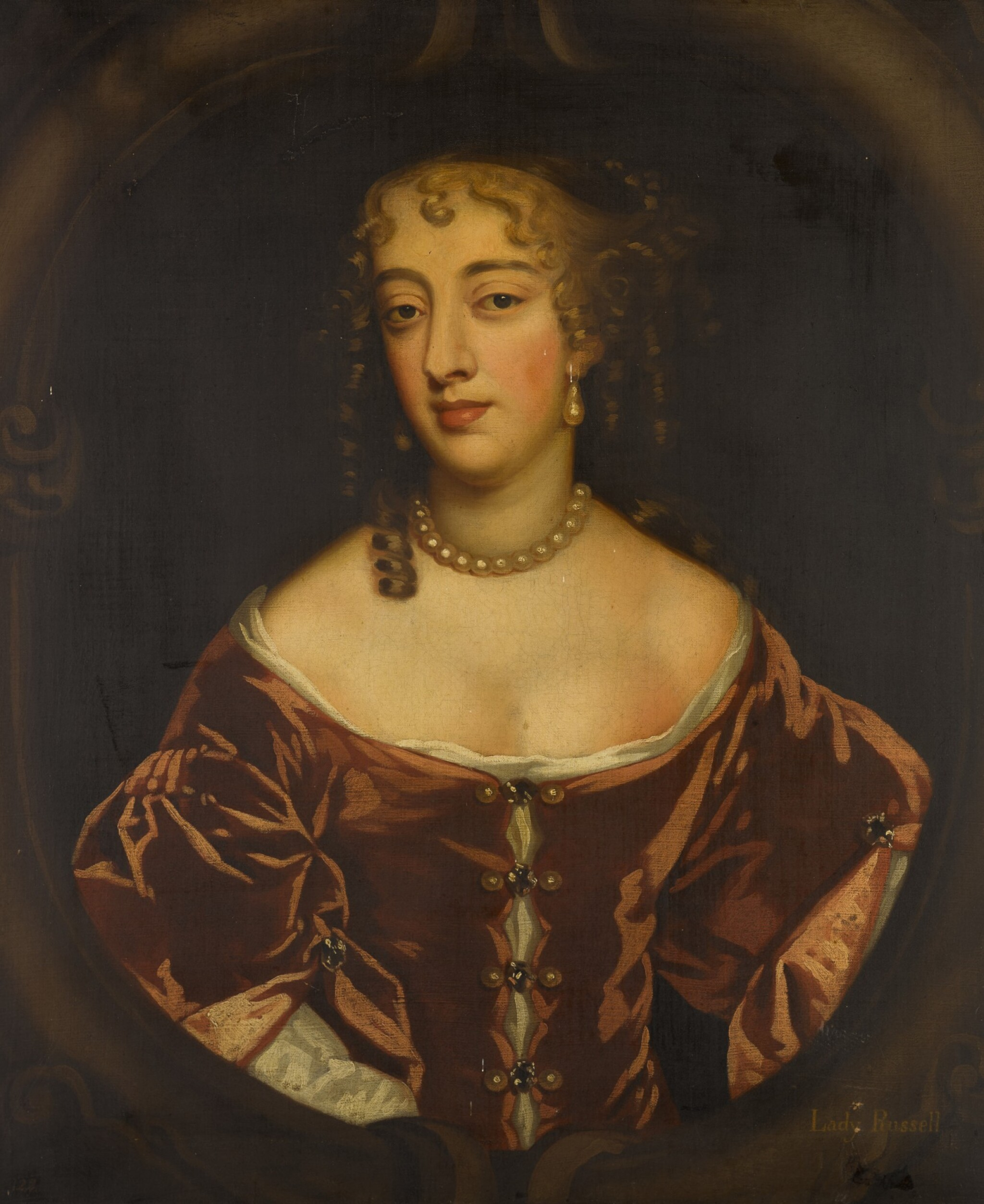
Portrait of Anne Popham (née Carr)

== Family ==
In 1645, Edward Popham married Anne (b. about 1623), daughter of William Carr who had been a Groom of the Bedchamber to James I. They had two children: a daughter, Letitia (b. about 1648), and a son, Alexander (born deaf in about 1649), whose daughter Anne married her second cousin Francis, a grandson of Popham's brother Alexander.

About ten years after Popham's death, his widow married Philip Wharton, 4th Baron Wharton on 26 August 1661. The household had eight children from Wharton's first two marriages as well as the two Popham children. Within a year, Wharton and Anne had a son, William. At this time, she approached Dr. John Wallis in Oxford to teach her son Alexander Popham to speak. The success of this work is one of the first documented cases of a deaf person learning to speak. Alexander later married and had a daughter Anne by his wife Brilliana Harley. Anne was not born deaf.
