= Sir Basil Firebrace, 1st Baronet =

- Born: 1652
- Died: 7 May 1724 (aged 71–72)
- Spouse: Elizabeth Hough
- Issue: Hester Firebrace; Sir Charles Firebrace, 2nd Baronet
- Father: Sir Henry Firebrace
- Mother: Elizabeth Dowell

Sir Basil Firebrace, 1st Baronet (1652 – 7 May 1724) was a supplier of wines to the royal household, Sheriff of London, and MP for Chippenham, Wiltshire, from 1690 to 1692. He was prosecuted for fraud and bribery, acquitted, and created a baronet in 1698.

== Early life ==
Firebrace was the second son of Sir Henry Firebrace, a courtier to both Charles I and Charles II, and Elizabeth Dowell; he was born in 1652.

== Career ==
Firebrace became a vintner and supplier of wines to the royal household. He went into partnership with Samuel Shepheard. He was Sheriff of London in 1687, and knighted; he was also appointed Colonel of the Orange Regiment of the London militia. He was admitted into the Worshipful Company of Vintners the following year and became an Alderman for Billingsgate.

He was elected MP for Chippenham as a Tory on 9 December 1690, but the election was declared void almost a year later, on 1 December 1691, and was re-run on 14 December. He again won but an election petition unseated him in favour of Thomas Tollemache on 22 January 1692. In 1694 he purchased West Lodge, Enfield Chase, where he resided until 1716.

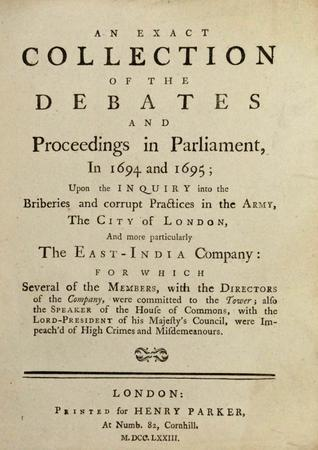
Contemporary pamphlet detailing Parliamentary proceedings against Firebrace and others

Firebrace also became a prominent figure in the East India Company and was imprisoned in the Tower of London by Parliament for bribery and fraud in relation to its activities. In April 1695 the House of Lords ordered that he be kept in "close confinement", having no contact with other prisoners. He was perhaps more of a go-between than a principal, and although criticised for his entrepreneurialism, he was eventually acquitted of all charges.

He was appointed 1st Baronet Firebrace in 1698 by King William III, was bankrupted in 1701 and again imprisoned, for stabbing a creditor.

== Marriage and family ==
He married Elizabeth, the daughter of merchant Thomas Hough on 7 September 1671, at St Margaret's, Westminster.

They produced five children, two of whom, Basil and Thomas, died in infancy. Of the survivors, Hester (c. 1675- c.1725) married Basil Feilding, 4th Earl of Denbigh, Charles (1680–1727) later inherited the baronetcy and their final child, George, was born in 1681.

Firebrace died on 7 May 1724; W. H. Auden was among his descendants.

== Notes ==
Parliament of England
Preceded by Richard Kent; Alexander Popham	Member of Parliament for Chippenham; 1690–1692; With: Alexander Popham	Succeeded by Thomas Tollemache; Alexander Popham
Baronetage of England
New creation	Baronet (of London); 1698–1724	Succeeded by Charles Firebrace
