= Thomas Estcourt (died 1702) =

English landowner and politician

Sir Thomas Estcourt

Member of Parliament for Malmesbury
- In office 1673–1679

High Sheriff of Wiltshire
- In office 1693–1693

Member of Parliament for Bath
- In office 1695–1698

Personal details
- Born: c. 1645
- Died: between March and October 1702
- Spouse: Mary Corbet
- Parent(s): Sir Thomas Estcourt and Magdalen Browne
- Education: St Edmund Hall, Oxford
- Alma mater: Lincoln's Inn
- Occupation: Landowner and politician

Sir Thomas Estcourt (c. 1645–1702) of Pinkney, near Sherston in Wiltshire, was an English landowner and politician.

He was the son of Sir Thomas Estcourt (d. 1683) of Sherston Pinkney, master in Chancery, by his first wife Magdalen, daughter of Sir John Browne of East Kirkby, Lincolnshire. He matriculated at St Edmund Hall, Oxford in 1661, aged 16, and was admitted to Lincoln's Inn the following year. He served as high steward of Malmesbury, was elected to sit in parliament for the town in 1673 and was knighted in 1674. In 1678, then living in Chelsea, he married Mary, daughter of Sir Vincent Corbet, 1st Baronet.

Although a Court supporter in parliament, he was charged with complicity in the Rye House Plot and withdrew to Flanders in the entourage of the Duke of York. He regained his Malmesbury seat at James II's accession, but was inactive. He lost the election at Malmesbury in 1690, but narrowly won at Bath in 1695. He stood down in 1698 in favour of his Wiltshire neighbour Alexander Popham. He was High Sheriff of Wiltshire for 1693.

He died between March and October 1702. His son Thomas died two years later and the estate passed to his daughter Elizabeth, who had married Richard Cresswell of Sidbury, Shropshire.
