= Alexander Popham (died 1705) =

English politician

Alexander Popham (c. 1670 – 16 June 1705), of Littlecote House, Littlecote, Wiltshire, and St. James's Square, London, was an English politician.

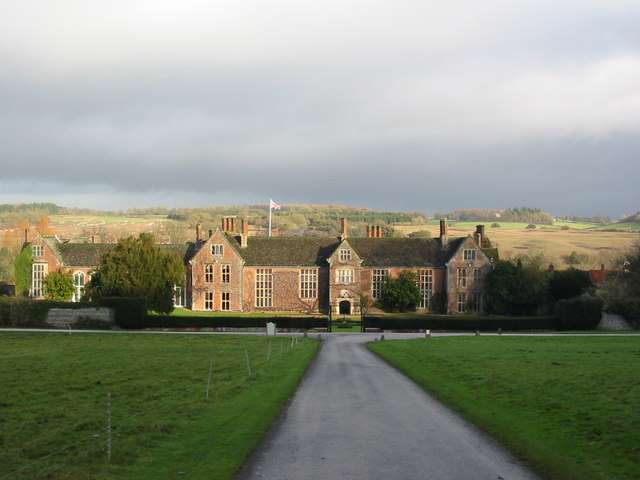
Littlecote House, Wiltshire

He was the only son of Sir Francis Popham of Littlecote Park.

Popham was a Member (MP) of the Parliament of England for Chippenham in 1690–1698 and for Bath from 1698 until his death on 16 June 1705.

He married Anne Montagu, daughter of Ralph Montagu, 1st Duke of Montagu. Their daughter, Elizabeth (died 20 March 1761), married firstly Edward Montagu, Viscount Hinchingbrooke, and secondly Francis Seymour, of Sherborne, Dorset.

Parliament of England
Preceded by Henry Bayntun; Nicholas Bayntun	Member of Parliament for Chippenham; 1690–1698; With: Richard Kent (1690); Sir Basil Firebrace (1690–1692); Thomas Tollemache (1692-1694); Richard Long (1694-1695); Walter White (1695-1698)	Succeeded by Edward Montagu; Walter White
Preceded by Sir Thomas Estcourt; William Blathwayt	Member of Parliament for Bath; 1698–1705; With: William Blathwayt	Succeeded by Samuel Trotman; William Blathwayt
