= William Holder =

English clergyman and music theorist

William Holder FRS (1616 – 24 January 1698) was an English clergyman and music theorist of the 17th century. His most notable work was his widely known 1694 publication A Treatise on the Natural Grounds and Principles of Harmony.

== Life ==
He studied at Pembroke Hall, Cambridge, where he became a fellow in 1640. He married Susanna Wren, sister of Christopher Wren, in 1643. In 1662 he received a D.D. Oxon., and was a fellow of the Royal Society in 1663. He became a Canon of St. Paul's in 1672, and served as sub-dean of the Chapel Royal from 1674 until 1689 when he resigned. In 1687 he had been preferred to the rectory of Therfield. A few of his musical compositions survive in the British Library in the Harleian MSS 7338 and 7339.

In 1660 at Bletchingdon he taught a deaf mute, Alexander Popham to speak "plainly and distinctly, and with a good and graceful tone". The division of credit for this between Holder and John Wallis became a matter of dispute in the Royal Society.

== See also ==
- Holdrian comma
