= Méraud Guinness =

British painter (1904–1993)

- Born: Méraud Michelle Wemyss Guinness; 24 June 1904; London, UKGBI
- Died: 6 May 1993 (aged 88); Paris, France
- Education: Slade School of Fine Art; Académie Julian; Académie de la Grande Chaumière
- Spouse: Álvaro Guevara (m. 1929, separated)
- Children: 1
- Father: Benjamin Seymour Guinness
- Relatives: Loel Guinness (sister)
- Family: Guinness family

Méraud Michelle Wemyss Guinness (24 June 1904 – 6 May 1993) also known as Méraud Guevara and Méraud Guevara-Guinness, was a British painter, writer and poet active in London and France.

== Life ==
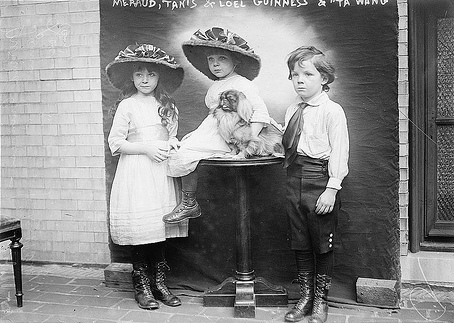
Meraud, Tanis, & Loel Guinness

Guinness was born on 24 June 1904 in London to Benjamin Seymour Guinness, an American Anglo-Irish businessman, banker, lawyer and member of the Guinness family (later also a Prince in the Italian nobility ), and Bridget Williams-Bulkeley. Guinness was the older sister of Loel Guinness.

Aged 19 she began studies at Slade School of Art in London and studied under Henry Tonks. From 1926 to 1927 she studied in New York under the sculptor Alexander Archipenko. During her time in New York she also wrote for Vogue magazine. She next moved to Paris, France and studied at both the Académie Julian and Académie de la Grande Chaumière under Francis Picabia and Pierre Tal-Coat.

Although earlier connected romantically to Christopher Wood, also sitting for him, she ultimately married Chilean painter Álvaro Guevara in 1929 and spent most of her life in the south of France, in Aix-en-Provence near him, but not with him, their marriage crumbling after the birth of their daughter Alladine Guevara in 1931.

In 1943, Guinness' work was included in Peggy Guggenheim's show Exhibition by 31 Women at the Art of This Century gallery in New York.

The summer of 1950 at a 'Coming Out' party at 12 Rue de Poitiers, Paris – the flat of the Guinness family – saw Guinness, her Aunt Tanis and Lady Diana Cooper act as hostesses. The party was organised by her brother Loel whose wife, Lady Isabel Manners, was the niece of Lady Diana Cooper. Cecil Beaton assisted by Guinness, undertook decorations at the home for the occasion.

She died in Paris on 6 May 1993.
