= Lady Violet Benson =

English artist & aristocrat (1888–1971)

Lady Violet Catherine Benson (née Manners; 24 April 1888 – 23 December 1971) was an English aristocrat, artist and socialite.

Lady Violet was considered a beauty and was the subject of drawings by George Frederic Watts and John Singer Sargent, the latter exhibited at the Royal Society of Portrait Painters in 1916. She attended the Slade School of Fine Art.

== Family and early life ==
Violet Catherine 'Letty' Manners was born on 24 April 1888 to Henry Manners, then Marquess of Granby, later 8th Duke of Rutland, and his wife, Violet, an aristocrat and artist. She was the fourth of the five children they raised together. (Note: Her younger sister Diana has said that although she was raised as a daughter of the 8th Duke of Rutland, she was actually fathered by Harry Cust, a Lincolnshire landowner and MP.) Due to her mother's alleged affair with Montagu Corry, 1st Baron Rowton, Violet was rumored to be fathered by Rowton.

Lady Violet's mother was a member of The Souls. Lady Violet's first marriage was one of at least seven unions between children of Souls' families. (Note: "The marriages between children of Souls' families were Ego Charteris to Violet Manners, Cynthia Charteris to Herbert Asquith, Irene Charteris to Ivor Windsor, Guy Charteris to Frances Tennant, Percy Wyndham to Diana Lister, Raymond Asquith to Katherine [sic?] Homer, and John Manners to Kathleen Tennant.") Her brother John was an art expert who became the 9th Duke of Rutland, and her sister Diana was an actor, author, and socialite.

== First marriage and issue ==
She married Hugo Francis Charteris (from 1914 Lord Elcho), the son of Hugo Charteris, 11th Earl of Wemyss and Mary Constance Wyndham on 1 February 1911. The wedding was held at St Margaret's Westminster, reported in The Times, (Note: "The bride's dress was of white charmeuse with a tunic of old English lace, held in at the waist by a band of gold tissue. The train was of gold brocade mounted on white velvet, at the hem of which were worked in gold the heraldic designs of the Rutland and Wemyss families.") and the reception at 10 Arlington St, London.

The couple had two children:

- Francis David Charteris, 12th Earl of Wemyss, (19 Jan 1912 – 12 Dec 2008).
- Lt.-Col. Martin Michael Charles Charteris, Baron Charteris of Amisfield, (7 Sep 1913 – died 23 Dec 1999). Martin Charteris was Private Secretary to Princess Elizabeth 1950–52, Assistant Private Secretary to the Sovereign (1952–72) and Private Secretary to the Sovereign (1972–77).

Hugo held a commission in the Royal Gloucestershire Hussars, and served in the First World War, with the rank of captain. (Note: His mother recorded her and Violet's last goodbye as Hugo ('Ego') left England: "At first the men were singing, or crooning a wild, rather lovely, murmuring song which mingled with the tramping of the horses and the clinking of their bits. Major Palmer, Tom Stricklnd, Aubrey Wickham Musgrave, and then Ego passed by, and all was silence save the sound of marching; but there was music in the jingle of the harness, and romance in the clank of accoutrements and the thud of the horses’ feet. When Ego rode by there was a slight pause for a last farewell, and then, looking splendid, he rode away into the darkness. Last of all came the creaking, groaning transports, and then silence; the place was utterly deserted. The Gallant Glittering Gloucesters had passed out of our sight and we went sadly home. I never saw Ego again.") He was killed at the Battle of Katia near the Suez Canal in Egypt on 23 April 1916 and is commemorated on the Jerusalem Memorial, and, with his brother Yvo, on the village war memorial at Stanway.

== Second marriage and issue ==
She married Guy Holford Benson, son of Robert Henry 'Robin' Benson, on 9 July 1921. (Note: The diary entry of Duff Cooper, her brother-in-law, reads: "This morning Letty was married to Guy [Benson]. I thought there was rather too much show and jolliness for a second wedding and that Letty was dressed rather too like a virgin bride. The Duchess sobbed at what she felt Lady Wemyss must be feeling but Lady Wemyss appeared unmoved.")

The couple had three children:

- Nicholas Robin Benson (2 May 1922 – 10 Jul 1990).
- Giles Barnaby Benson (18 Dec 1923 – 30 Jul 1972).
- Jeremy Henry Benson OBE (25 Jun 1925 – 1 Dec 1999). Jeremy Benson was inspired by his mother's experiences growing up while Haddon Hall was undergoing restoration. He became an architect and conservationist, he restored many historic houses, successfully lobbied for heritage taxation exemptions in the 1970s, and played a role in the creation of English Heritage and the National Lottery Heritage Fund.

Guy Benson was a partner in Robin Benson & co, and a Director of London Assurance (1927-60).

== Death ==
Violet Benson died on 23 December 1971 and is buried in the churchyard at Stanway, Gloucestershire, with her second husband (who died four years later), next to her second son, Martin. The church is adjacent to the Charteris residence in England, Stanway House.

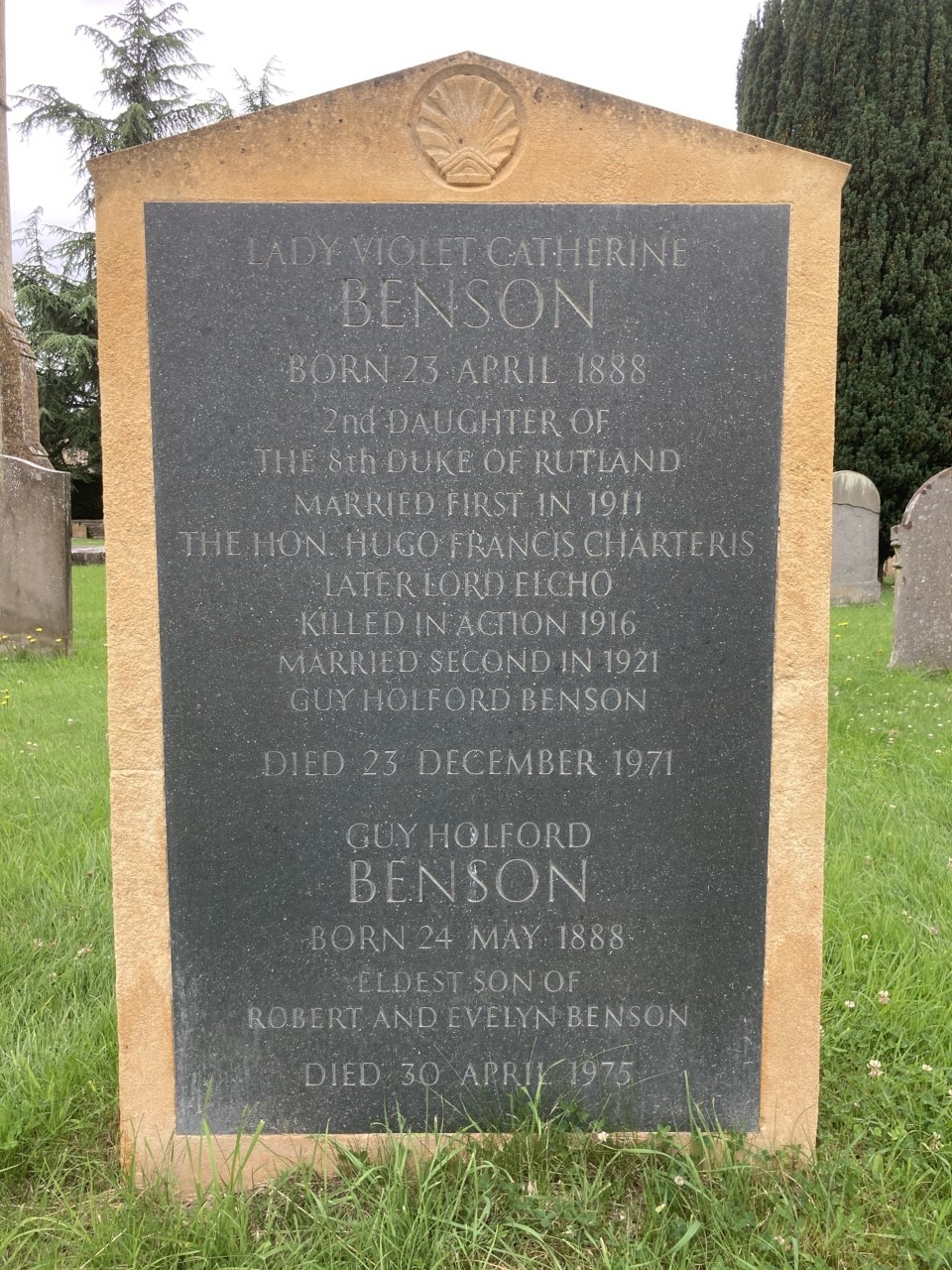
Gravestone of Violet Benson and Guy Holford Benson
