= Lady Ursula d'Abo =

Maid of honour to Queen Elizabeth the Queen Mother (1916–2017)

- Lady Ursula in 1937
- Born: Ursula Isabel Manners; 8 November 1916; London, England
- Died: 2 November 2017 (aged 100); London, England
- Occupation: Socialite
- Spouse(s): Anthony Marreco (m. 1943; div. 1948) Erland d'Abo (m. 1951; died 1970)
- Children: 3
- Parents: John Manners, 9th Duke of Rutland (father); Kathleen Tennant (mother)
- Relatives: Manners family

Lady Ursula Isabel d'Abo (née Manners, formerly Marreco; 8 November 1916 – 2 November 2017) was an English socialite and aristocrat who served as a maid of honour to the Queen at the Coronation of King George VI and Queen Elizabeth in 1937. She received international media attention after her photograph from that day, standing alongside the British royal family on the balcony of Buckingham Palace, circulated in the news. Reporters focused on her beauty and distinctive widow's peak, and an American wrote to the editor of a newspaper, asking "who is the girl with the widow's peak?" The title of her 2014 book, The Girl with the Widow's Peak: The Memoirs, played with this question.

Winston Churchill nicknamed Lady Ursula "the cygnet" in 1938 for her comparative youth and beauty among a travelling company that accompanied the king and queen on a royal tour in France that year.

During World War II Lady Ursula worked as a nurse with the Voluntary Aid Detachment before being appointed to a managerial position over 2,000 women employees at the British Manufacture and Research Company's munitions factory in Grantham. In her later life she received attention for her brief relationship with Maharaja Man Singh II of Jaipur and her long-term affair with American oilman J. Paul Getty.

== Early life ==
Lady Ursula Isabel Manners was born in London on 8 November 1916 to John Manners, Marquess of Granby, and Kathleen Tennant. She was the eldest of five children. Her father was the second son and eventual heir of Henry Manners, 8th Duke of Rutland, and Violet Lindsay. After the death of her grandfather, her father became the 9th Duke of Rutland. Her mother was the niece of British prime minister H. H. Asquith and a granddaughter of Sir Charles Tennant, 1st Baronet. She was a paternal niece of Diana Cooper, Viscountess Norwich, and Marjorie Paget, Marchioness of Anglesey.

Lady Ursula first lived at Wood House, a small farmhouse in Derbyshire, and at a residence in London. She spent a lot of time at the family estates, Haddon Hall and Belvoir Castle, the latter of which she moved to once her father inherited the dukedom in 1925. When she was eight years old, she helped her father with the restoration at Haddon Hall, where she discovered medieval frescoes of Saint Christopher in the chapel. These had been whitewashed over during the English Reformation.

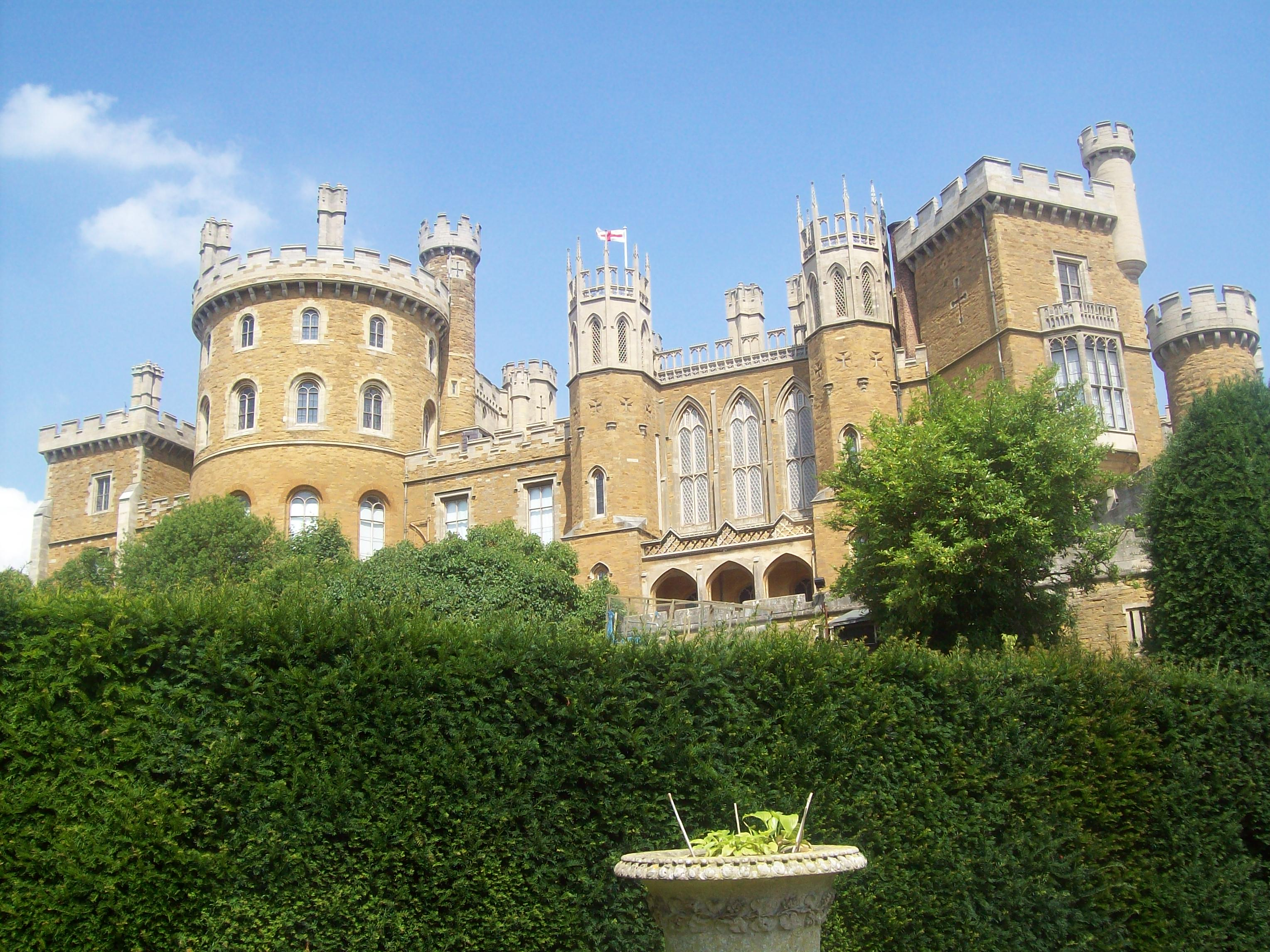
Belvoir Castle, where Lady Ursula spent much of her childhood.

In her youth, she was a friend of Edward, Prince of Wales, and a playmate of Princesses Elizabeth and Margaret of York at Bognor.

C. E. Brock painted a portrait of Lady Ursula with two of her siblings, Charles and Isabel, when the three were children.

She trained in ballet, taking lessons from Tamara Karsavina, a former principal dancer with the Imperial Russian Ballet. She was educated by governesses in mathematics, French, Latin, swimming, piano, sewing, cooking, and riding. As a teenager Lady Ursula and her sister, Isabel, were sent to France with their governess. After living in Paris, Lady Ursula was sent to finishing school at the Villa Malatesta in Florence, Italy where she studied Italian, art, and architecture.

In 1934, at the age of seventeen, she and her sister had a coming out ball hosted in their honour at Belvoir Castle. Soon after, she was presented at court to George V and Mary of Teck. As the daughter of a duke, she took part in local charitable organisations and events alongside her parents.

In February 1936 English artist Cuthbert Bradley painted a watercolour and gouache portrait of Lady Ursula in a hunting scene, titled Lady Ursula Manners.

Lady Ursula was a childhood friend of Rex Whistler. They corresponded in early adulthood until he was killed in combat during World War II.

== Adulthood ==
=== Coronation and official duties ===
In 1937 Lady Ursula served as one of six maids of honour to Queen Elizabeth during her and King George VI's coronation at Westminster Abbey. Lady Ursula, along with the other maids of honour, was dressed in a white gown designed by Norman Hartnell, the royal dressmaker to the Queen. She was photographed alongside the royal family on the balcony of Buckingham Palace after the ceremony and received international media attention when observers noted her beauty and distinctive widow's peak. Later that year she was photographed by Cecil Beaton.

On 19 July 1938 Lady Ursula accompanied the King and the Queen on their first official visit to Paris. She was nicknamed "the cygnet" by Sir Winston Churchill.

=== World War II ===
Once the United Kingdom entered into World War II, the Manners family arranged to lend Belvoir Castle and Haddon Hall as repositories for historic national documents from the Public Record Office. Lady Ursula's father died from septicaemia on 22 April 1940. Her brother Charles then became the 10th Duke of Rutland.

During World War II, Manners joined the Voluntary Aid Detachment in London, working alongside the Red Cross. Her first post was at the Ashton Hotel in Paddington, where she cleaned railway carriages. In 1940 Lady Ursula was working as a nurse at Battersea General Hospital and had to evacuate patients after a bombing. She was later posted to St George's Hospital at Hyde Park Corner, where she was responsible for giving atropine injections to the wounded before they underwent operations. While working at St George's Hospital she resided at her mother's residence in Audley Square, Mayfair until it was severely damaged in an air raid. Lady Ursula survived unscathed and was taken to the Dorchester Hotel by a policeman to stay with her aunt and uncle, Duff Cooper, 1st Viscount Norwich and Lady Diana Cooper.

Faced with being transferred to a country hospital after more bombings in London, she chose to resign and return home to Belvoir. Peregrine Cust, 6th Baron Brownlow arranged for her to meet Denis Kendall, the managing director of the British Manufacture and Research Company's munitions factory, who offered her a job. She accepted a position at the factory in Grantham, where she oversaw 2,000 women employed to make bullets for the war effort.

=== Personal life ===
On 25 July 1943, Manners married barrister Anthony Marreco in the chapel at Belvoir Castle. Her husband left to serve in the British Armed Forces in Asia and lost communication with her until 1946. During this time she entered a brief relationship with the Maharaja of Jaipur, Man Singh II, whom she met through her friend Jawaharlal Nehru. Lady Ursula and Marreco divorced in 1948.

In October 1947 she attended the wedding of Cayetana Fitz-James Stuart, 18th Duchess of Alba and Luis Martínez de Irujo y Artázcoz at the Cathedral of Saint Mary of the See in Seville, Spain.

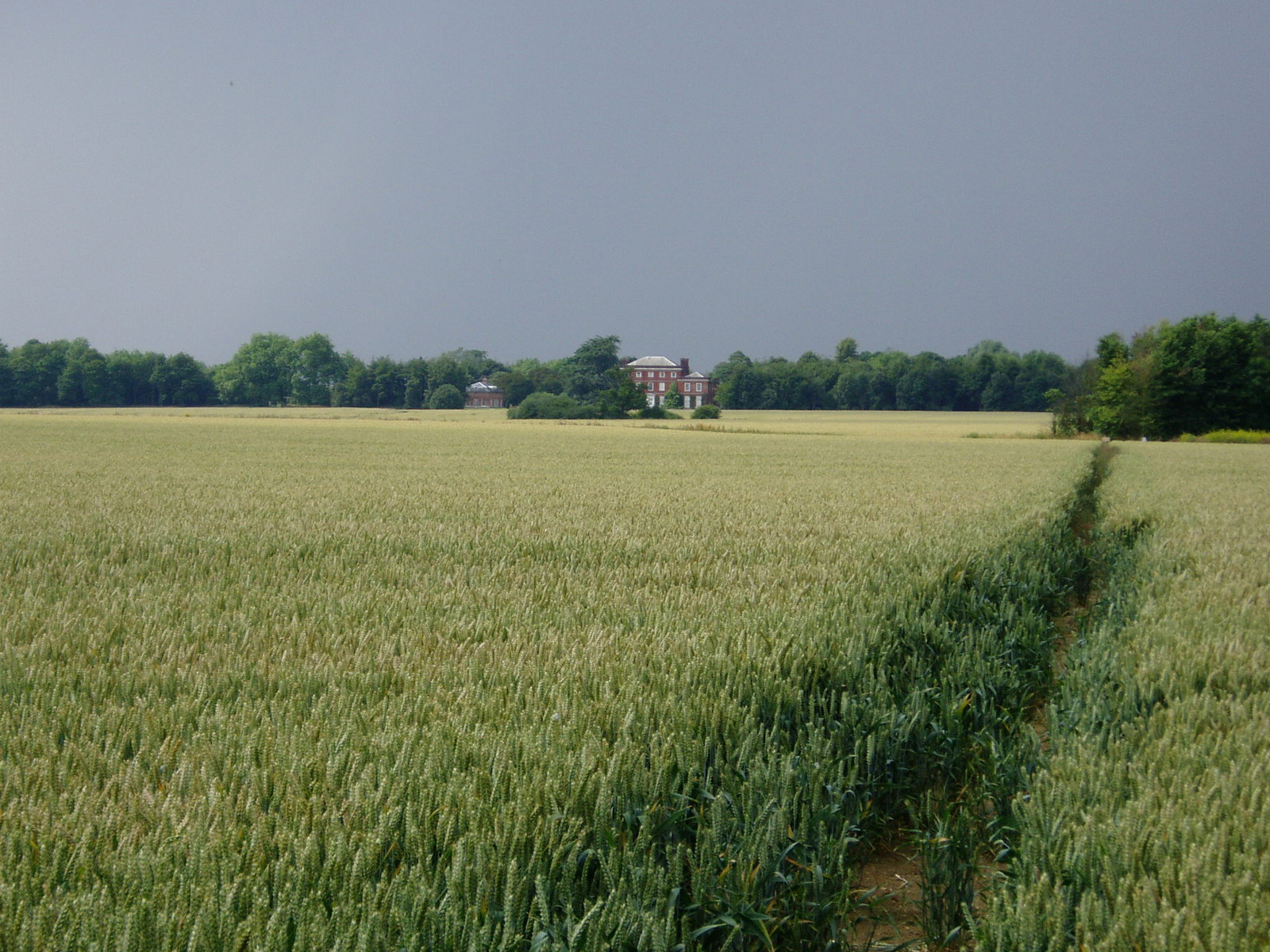
West Wratting Park, the d'Abo's home.

Upon returning to England, she was courted by financier Erland d'Abo and by John Scott, Earl of Dalkeith. During this time she was in a serious car accident with d'Abo and had to undergo facial reconstructive surgery under Arthur Rainsford Mowlem.

On 22 November 1951 she married Erland d'Abo at the St. Andrew's Church in West Wratting, Cambridgeshire. They moved into West Wratting Park, a Georgian country house, and also purchased a mansion in Kensington Square. They had three children. Their first child, John Henry Erland d'Abo, was born on 7 October 1953. Their second child, Louisa Jane d'Abo, was born on 8 January 1955. Their third child, Richard Winston Mark d'Abo, was born on 3 July 1956. Her husband died from a heart attack in 1970.

By that time, Lady Ursula had been in a long-time affair with American oil tycoon J. Paul Getty. They lived together for five years at Sutton Place. She was aware that Getty had affairs with other European aristocratic women at this time, including Mary Teissier and Countess Marianne von Alvensleben. When Getty died in 1976, he left her an inheritance, reportedly £85,000 and $165,250 in stock.

==== Death ====
Lady Ursula d'Abo died at her apartment in Buckingham court, Kensington, in the presence of her family on 2 November 2017, six days before her 101st birthday.

== Memoir ==
Her autobiographical memoir, titled The Girl with the Widow's Peak: The Memoirs, was published in 2014.

== Works cited ==
- d'Abo, Lady Ursula (2014). Watkin, David (ed.). The Girl with the Widow's Peak: The Memoirs. London: d'Abo Publications. ISBN 978-1907991097.
- Cooper, Lady Diana (2014). Darling Monster: The Letters of Lady Diana Cooper to Son John Julius Norwich, 1939-1952 (reprint ed.). The Overlook Society. ISBN 9781468311136.
