= Marreco =

Marreco is a surname. Notable people with the surname include:

- Anne Marreco (1912–1982), pen name of Anne Wignall, English socialite and author
- Anthony Marreco (1915–2006), British barrister
- Barbara Freire-Marreco (1879–1967), English anthropologist and folklorist
- Lady Ursula Marreco (1916–2017), English socialite and aristocrat
- Tozé Marreco (born 1987), Portuguese footballer

== See also ==
- Marreco Futsal, a Brazilian futsal club
