= Sidney Reginald Daniels =

Sidney Daniels in 1929

Sidney Reginald Daniels (18 September 1873 – 18 August 1937), was a British Liberal Party politician, Civil Servant and Barrister-at-law.

== Background ==
He was the son of Joseph Daniels and Clara Ada Isacke. He was educated at Wycliffe College (Gloucestershire) and Balliol College, Oxford. He married in 1903, Caroline Hutchings. She died in 1908. In 1911 he then married Annie Fraser Dixon, of Settle.

== Civil Service career ==
In 1893 he became a Boden Sanscrit Scholar and entered Indian Civil Service. From November 1915 to February 1916 he served as President of the Special Tribunal under the Defence of India Act. From 1917-21 he was Legal Remembrancer to the Government of the United Provinces. From 1921–25 he was Additional Judicial Commissioner, and subsequently Judicial Commissioner of Oudh. From 1925–28 he was Puisne judge of the High Court at Allahabad.

== Political career ==
At parliamentary elections he contested, as a Liberal party candidate Bath four times; first at the 1929 Bath by-election then at the General Elections of 1929, 1931 and 1935. The first occasion was at a by-election in March 1929, where he only just managed to hang on to second place. This was at the time that the Liberal party was experiencing something of a revival under the leadership of David Lloyd George.

1929 Bath by-election Electorate 35,373
Party	Candidate	Votes	%	±%
Unionist	Hon. Charles William Baillie-Hamilton	11,171	45.1	−10.7
Liberal	Sidney Reginald Daniels	7,255	29.3	−1.3
Labour	George Gilbert Desmond	6,359	25.7	+12.1
Majority		3916	15.8	−9.4
Turnout		24,785	72.8	−11.7
Unionist hold		Swing	-4.6	

Just two months later he stood again at the General Election, where he again finished second.

General Election 30 May 1929: Bath Electorate 46,877
Party	Candidate	Votes	%	±%
Unionist	Hon. Charles William Baillie-Hamilton	17,845	46.9	+1.8
Liberal	Sidney Reginald Daniels	11,485	30.1	+0.8
Labour	George Gilbert Desmond	8,769	23.0	−2.7
Majority		6,360	16.8	+1.0
Turnout			81.3	+8.5
Unionist hold		Swing	+0.5	

His next contest was at the 1931 elections. This proved a difficult campaign as a National Government had been formed. Many Liberal candidates in Conservative held seats chose not to run against their partners in the National Government. This did not happen at Bath but the Liberal party nationally fought a weak campaign.

General Election 27 October 1931: Bath Electorate 47,930
Party	Candidate	Votes	%	±%
Conservative	Thomas Loel Evelyn Bulkeley Guinness	24,696	64.0	+17.1
Liberal	Sidney Reginald Daniels	8,241	21.3	−8.8
Labour	George Gilbert Desmond	5,680	14.7	−8.3
Majority		16,455	42.6	+25.8
Turnout			80.6	−0.7
Conservative hold		Swing	+12.9	

His last election campaign was fought under more normal circumstances as by now, the Liberal party had left the National government which had become Conservative in all but name. The result in Bath was an improvement as a consequence.

General Election 14 November 1935: Bath Electorate 49,022
Party	Candidate	Votes	%	±%
Conservative	Thomas Loel Evelyn Bulkeley Guinness	20,670	56.6	−7.4
Liberal	Sidney Reginald Daniels	8,650	23.7	+2.4
Labour	George Gilbert Desmond	7,185	19.7	+5.0
Majority		12,020	32.9	−9.8
Turnout			74.5	−6.0
Conservative hold		Swing	-4.7	

He did not stand for parliament again. He was Deputy Chairman of the Executive Committee of the Proportional Representation Society. Daniels is an interesting example of a loyal Liberal politician who by being in India, had not experienced the divisions in the party between Lloyd George and Asquith. In the 1930s, during a period in which many Liberals either dropped out of active politics or left the party for another, Daniels kept going without personal reward.
