= Lady Isabella =

Lady Isabella may refer to:

== People ==
- Lady Isabella Hervey (b. 1982), British socialite and actress
- Lady Isabel Manners (1918–2008), British socialite
- Isabel Neville, Duchess of Clarence (1451–1476)
- Isabella of Gloucester and Hertford (1226–1264)
- Isabella FitzRoy, Duchess of Grafton (1668–1723)
- Isabella of Ibelin, Queen of Cyprus (1252–1282), Crusader noble in the city of Beirut

== Other uses ==
- Lady Isabel, 19th-century English child ballad
- Laxey Wheel, nicknamed Lady Isabella, a large waterwheel on the Isle of Man
- Lady Isabella, Sheriff of Nottingham, fictional character in the 2006 TV series Robin Hood
