= Kathleen Manners, Duchess of Rutland =

English aristocrat (1894–1989)

Her Grace The Duchess of Rutland
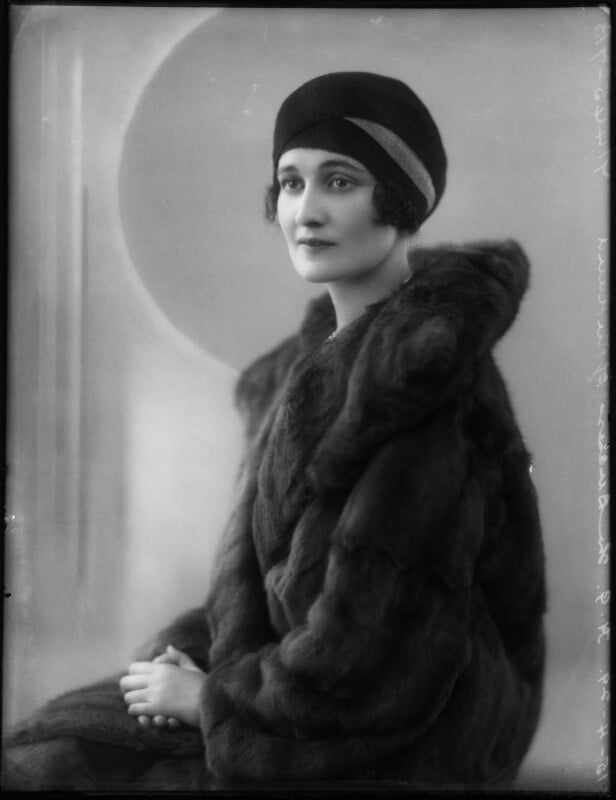
- Manners in 1929
- Born: Kathleen Tennant; 30 January 1894; London, England
- Died: 4 December 1989 (aged 95); Belgravia, London
- Spouse: John Manners, 9th Duke of Rutland (m. 1916; died 1940)
- Children: 5, including: Lady Ursula Manners; Lady Isabel Manners; Charles Manners, 10th Duke of Rutland
- Parents: Francis John Tennant (father); Annie Geraldine Redmayne (mother)
- Family: Tennant (by birth); Manners (by marriage)

Kathleen Manners, Duchess of Rutland (née Tennant; 30 January 1894 – 4 December 1989) was an English aristocrat and the wife of John Manners, 9th Duke of Rutland.

== Early life ==
Kathleen Tennant, who was informally known by the nickname Kakoo, was born on 30 January 1894 in London into the Tennant family, an influential Scottish industrial family that had been ennobled. Her mother was Annie Geraldine Redmayne and her father was Francis John Tennant of Innes, Morayshire, and Lympne Castle, Kent.

Her paternal grandfather was the industrialist Sir Charles Tennant, 1st Baronet. Her father, who was a member of The Souls, was the younger brother of Edward Tennant, 1st Baron Glenconner and Margot Asquith, the wife of British Prime Minister H. H. Asquith.

== Royal friendship ==
As a close friend to the Duke and Duchess of York, Manners disliked Wallis Simpson and disapproved of Edward VIII's abdication. At the 1937 Coronation of King George VI and Queen Elizabeth, she was one of four duchesses who carried the canopy over the Queen.

== Marriage and issue ==
She married John Henry Montague Manners, Marquess of Granby, the son of Henry Manners, 8th Duke of Rutland and Violet Lindsay, on 27 January 1916 at St Margaret's, Westminster. They had five children:

- Lady Ursula Isabel Manners (1916–2017), who married Lt.-Cmdr. Anthony Freire Marreco. She later married Robert Erland Nicolai d'Abo.
- Lady Isabel Violet Kathleen Manners (1918–2008), who first married Grp. Capt. Thomas "Loel" Guinness (son of Prince Benjamin Seymour Guinness) and had issue including Lindy Hamilton-Temple-Blackwood, Marchioness of Dufferin and Ava. Her second marriage was to Sir Robert Throckmorton, 11th Baronet.
- Charles John Robert Manners, 10th Duke of Rutland (1919–1999)
- Lord John Martin Manners (1922–2001), who married and had a daughter.
- Lord Roger David Manners (1925–2017), who married and had two daughters.

In 1925 her husband succeeded to the Dukedom of Rutland and she became the Duchess of Rutland.

Her husband died in 1940. After his death, her son became the 10th Duke of Rutland. She moved out of Belvoir Castle and into Belvoir Lodge, accompanied by two servants, Emily Stenton and Sidney Parkes. She died at her home in Belgravia on 4 December 1989 at the age of 95.
