= John Manners, 9th Duke of Rutland =

English peer and medieval art expert

His Grace The Duke of Rutland
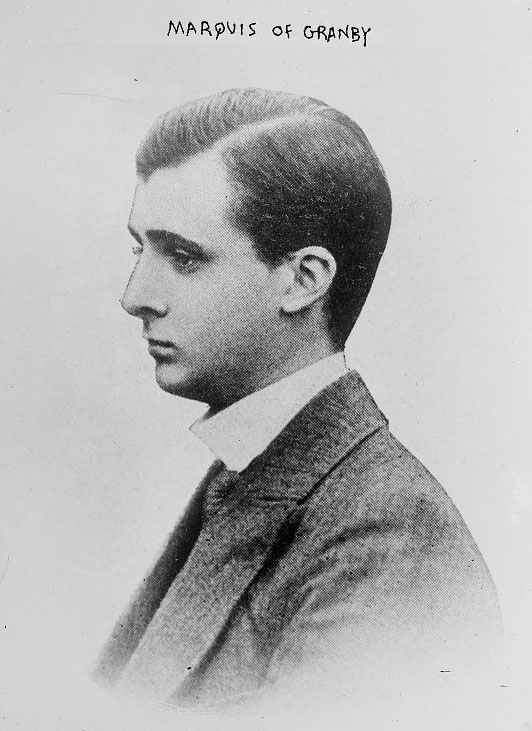
- The Duke of Rutland, then Marquess of Granby, in 1914

Personal details
- Born: John Henry Montagu Manners; 21 August 1886 London, England
- Died: 22 April 1940 (aged 53) Belvoir Castle, Leicestershire
- Spouse: Kathleen Tennant (m. 1916)
- Children: 5, including Ursula, Isabel, and Charles
- Parent(s): Henry Manners, 8th Duke of Rutland; Violet Lindsay

Captain John Henry Montagu Manners, 9th Duke of Rutland (21 August 1886 – 22 April 1940), styled as Marquess of Granby from 1906 to 1925, was an English peer and medieval art expert.

== Early life and education ==
Rutland was the younger son of Henry Manners, 8th Duke of Rutland and his wife Violet. His mother was the daughter of Colonel the Hon. Charles Lindsay, third son of the 25th Earl of Crawford. His elder brother, Robert, Lord Haddon, died in 1894 at the age of 9. His sister Diana Manners was a leading light of the "Corrupt Coterie". Rutland was educated at Eton College and Trinity College, Cambridge. He joined the Diplomatic Service as an Honorary Attaché and was posted to the British Embassy in Rome in 1909.

== Military career ==
He was commissioned into the part-time 4th Battalion Leicestershire Regiment (of which his father was honorary colonel) as a second lieutenant in 1910. He resigned in July 1914 but withdrew his resignation on the outbreak of World War I and was promoted to lieutenant. He was seconded as an aide-de-camp in March 1916 to General Edward Montagu-Stuart-Wortley and reached the rank of captain by the end of the war.

He was sent to the Western Front in February 1915, but it was recently revealed that he did not actually see battle, and instead was stationed at the regional headquarters at Goldfish Chateau:

"Despite leading the Remembrance Day parade through Rutland year after year and presiding over the ceremony, his supposed military service was a sham – but not one initially of his own making. His mother, Violet Manners, the 8th Duchess of Rutland, used her considerable persuasive powers and position to conspire with Lord Kitchener and Sir John French, the Commander in Chief of the Western Front, to keep her son from the fighting. Eventually, she rigged a series of medical examinations and dashed any hopes John had of battling in the trenches in Ypres with his regiment – the 4th Battalion Leicestershire (the Tigers)."

John was however not without guilt. Author Catherine Bailey, who wrote the book The Secret Rooms about the Duke, stated that Rutland "to begin with, did all he could to fight with the men of the 4th Leicesters. But it was his mother's meddling and constant undermining that finally got him returned home". There is evidence however that after John met his future wife, he became complicit in his mother's conspiracy to have him removed from frontline duties and thus he spent the rest of his life ashamed and his final years locked away trying to destroy any documents that might reveal his disgraceful conduct during the war."

== Later life and family ==
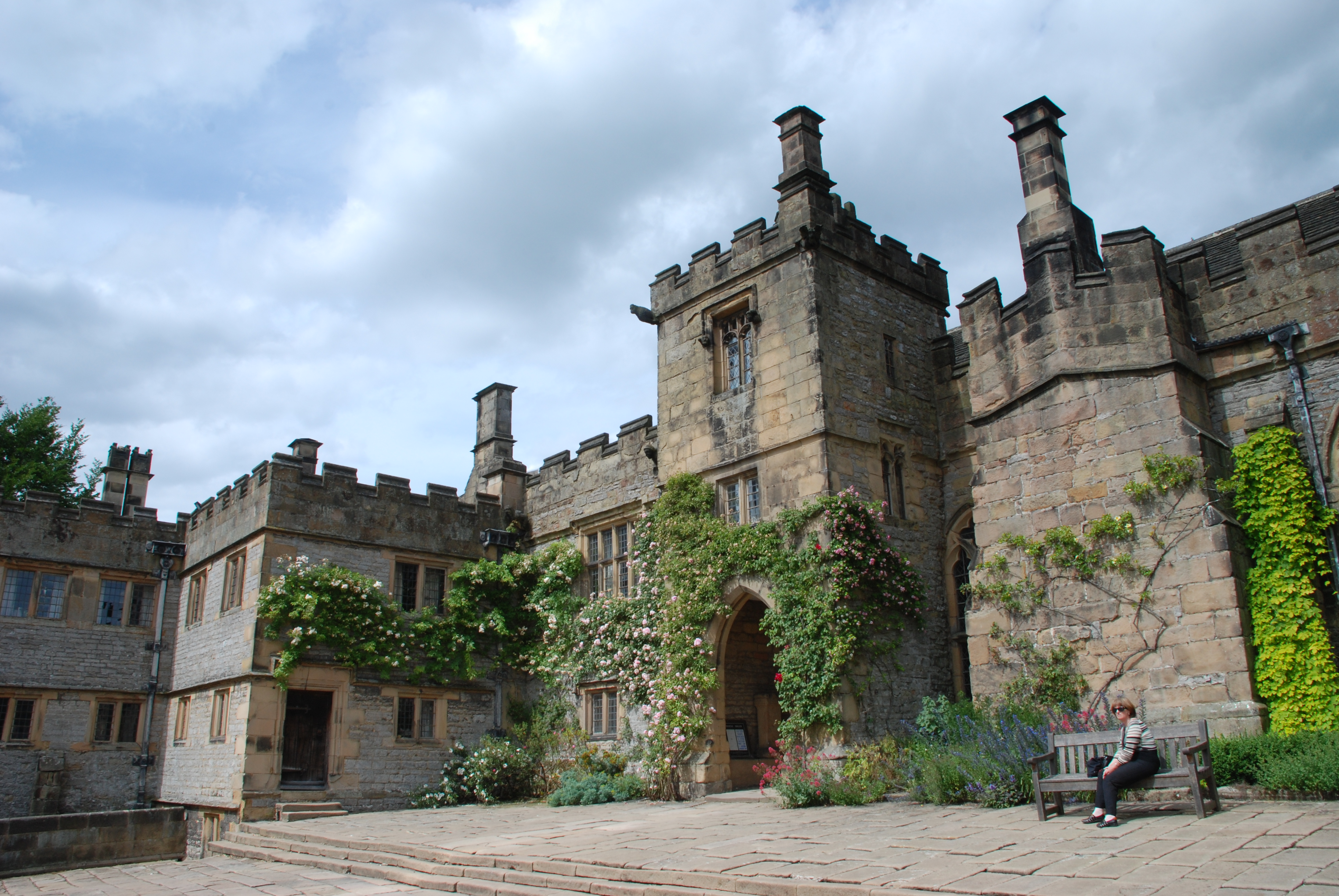
Haddon Hall

On 27 January 1916, he married Kathleen Tennant (1895–1989), whom he knew from his mother's circle "The Souls." She was the granddaughter of Sir Charles Tennant, 1st Baronet. They had five children:

- Lady Ursula Isabel Manners (8 November 1916 – 2 November 2017), married firstly, Lt.-Cmdr. Anthony Freire Marreco. She married secondly, Robert Erland Nicolai d'Abo and had issue.
- Lady Isabel Violet Kathleen Manners (5 January 1918 – 21 December 2008). She married firstly Group Captain Thomas "Loel" Guinness (son of Benjamin Seymour Guinness) and had issue including Lindy Hamilton-Temple-Blackwood, Marchioness of Dufferin and Ava. She married secondly Sir Robert Throckmorton, 11th Baronet.
- Charles John Robert Manners, 10th Duke of Rutland (1919–1999)
- Captain Lord John Martin Manners (10 September 1922 – 11 November 2001), married and had a daughter.
- Lord Roger David Manners (23 September 1925 – 1 October 2017), married and had a son and two daughters.

He succeeded to the dukedom in 1925. In 1927, he "realized his boyhood dream" by establishing residence at the historic Haddon Hall, which he painstakingly restored.

He was patron of the then Loughborough College, and Rutland Hall on the university campus is named in his honour.

He died of pneumonia at Belvoir Castle in 1940, eight days after being taken ill.

== Interests ==
Despite his dishonesty about his military service, Rutland was well respected in other areas and by his peers. Art historian Tancred Borenius eulogized Rutland in The Times thus:

"The distinction of the Duke of Rutland as an authority on medieval art is rightly stressed in the obituary which appeared in The Times, and it should perhaps be further emphasized, that in one department of the study of English Medieval Art he was a pioneer whose performance, calling for immense labour and patience, has laid the foundations for all future research on the subject. I am referring to the inlaid floor-tiles of medieval England, which began to claim attention among antiquaries about the middle of the last century and ever since that time have formed the subject of various specialist publications: but no one has ever brought to the subject the whole-hearted enthusiasm of the late Duke, and the results which he achieved are on a truly magnificent scale. His collection of English medieval floor- tiles is without a rival in the world. It is beautifully set out in one of the rooms at Belvoir, and has been catalogued by him in a monumental typewritten work of two folio volumes, illustrated with coloured reproductions all his own work. It is greatly to be hoped that this catalogue may one day be published, for it goes far beyond anything that has so far been published on the subject."

A friend, John Gilliat, wrote to The Times –

"When one reads the obituary notice of the late Duke of Rutland, the bare facts of his career seem to fall so far short of giving the reader the true picture of the man as his intimate friends knew him. To those friends his passing has left a blank impossible to refill, and this applies equally to his staff at Belvoir and Haddon. Here was a man in every sense of the word belonging to a school that to the country's loss represented a type of the Grand Seigneur, living his life for his own people's welfare and enriching all those with whom he came in contact by his erudite knowledge not only of manuscripts and early English furniture, heraldry, early tiles, and historical records, but also by his intimate knowledge of birds and every kind of animal life within these islands... We who knew him on such terms loved him and he had the great art of making us at our best when in his company: his like we shall not see again, and the country is the poorer for his death, even though so few were privileged to know him as we did."

== Coat of arms ==
Coat of arms of John Manners, 9th Duke of Rutland
Coronet A Coronet of a Duke Crest On a Chapeau Gules turned up Ermine a Peacock in its pride proper Escutcheon Or two Bars Azure a Chief quarterly of the last and Gules, in the first and fourth, two Fleur-de-lis, and in the second and third, a Lion passant guardant, all Or Supporters On either side a Unicorn Argent armed, maned, tufted and unguled Or Motto Pour Y Parvenir ("So as to accomplish it")

Peerage of England
Preceded by Henry Manners	Duke of Rutland; 1925–1940	Succeeded by Charles Manners
