= Lady Isabel Manners =

British socialite (1918–2008)

- Born: Isabel Manners; 5 January 1918
- Died: 21 December 2008 (aged 90)
- Occupation: Socialite
- Spouse(s): Loel Guinness (divorced); Sir Robert Throckmorton, 11th Baronet
- Children: 2 (including Lindy Hamilton-Temple-Blackwood, Marchioness of Dufferin and Ava)
- Parents: John Manners, 9th Duke of Rutland (father); Kathleen Tennant (mother)
- Family: Manners

Lady Isabel Violet Kathleen Manners (5 January 1918 – 21 December 2008) was a British socialite who was prominent in Palm Beach and New York. She was the daughter of John Manners, the 9th Duke of Rutland and was married, firstly, to British MP Loel Guinness and, secondly, to Sir Robert Throckmorton, 11th Baronet.

== Early life and family ==
Lady Isabel Manners was born in 1918, the second of five children of John Manners, Marquess of Granby and Kathleen Tennant. Her father was the son and heir of Henry Manners, 8th Duke of Rutland and her mother was a descendant of Sir Charles Tennant, 1st Baronet and a niece of British Prime Minister H. H. Asquith. Lady Isabel was the niece of Lady Diana Cooper and Marjorie Paget, Marchioness of Anglesey.

She lived at Wood House, a farmhouse in Derbyshire, and at her family's residence in London until her father succeeded to the Dukedom of Rutland in 1925, at which time the family moved to Belvoir Castle.

In her youth, she and two of her siblings, Charles and Ursula, were painted in watercolour and gouache by C. E. Brock.

As a teenager, Lady Isabel and her sister, Ursula, were sent to France with their governess. In 1934, the two sisters were debutantes, attending a coming out ball hosted in their honour at Belvoir Castle and, later, they were presented at court.

== Adult life ==
On 9 September 1936, Lady Isobel became engaged to the Conservative politician Loel Guinness. They married on 24 November 1936 in London at St Ethelburga's Bishopsgate. After the wedding, they went on a four-month honeymoon aboard their yacht, Atlantis, to Palm Beach, Florida and New York. The couple were prominent socialites in Palm Beach.

They had two children:'

- William Loel Seymour Guinness (born 1939), who married Agnes Elizabeth Lynn Day in 1971.
- Serena Belinda Rosemary "Lindy" Guinness (25 March 1941 – 26 October 2020), who married Sheridan Hamilton-Temple-Blackwood, 5th Marquess of Dufferin and Ava in 1964, a great-grandson of Edward Guinness, 1st Earl of Iveagh.

They divorced in 1951 on the grounds of Guinness' adultery. She married a second time to Sir Robert Throckmorton, 11th baronet.

== Works cited ==
- d'Abo, Lady Ursula (2014). Watkin, David (ed.). The Girl with the Widow's Peak: The Memoirs. London: d'Abo Publications. ISBN 978-1907991097.
