= 1929 Bath by-election =

UK parliamentary by-election

The 1929 Bath by-election was a parliamentary by-election held on 21 March 1929 for the UK constituency of Bath in Somerset.

== Vacancy ==
The by-election was caused by the death of the sitting MP, the Unionist Charles Foxcroft on 11 February 1929. He had been the MP since the December 1918 general election, apart from 1923-24 following his defeat to the Liberals.

== History ==
Before 1918, Bath was a two-member seat that had regularly changed hands between Unionists and Liberals. Since 1918, the Unionists had won on every occasion apart from the 1923 general election, when the Liberal, Frank Raffety won, thanks to the absence of a Labour candidate. Raffety was defeated by Foxcroft at the last General Election when Labour intervened;

General election 29 October 1924: Electorate 34,042
Party	Candidate	Votes	%	±%
Unionist	Charles Foxcroft	16,067	55.8	+7.4
Liberal	Frank Raffety	8,800	30.6	−21.0
Labour	Walter Barton Scobell	3,914	13.6	N/A
Majority		7,267	25.2	N/A
Turnout		28,781	84.5	+5.4
Unionist gain from Liberal		Swing	+14.2	

== Candidates ==
The Unionist candidate was the Honorable Charles Baillie-Hamilton, younger brother of the Earl of Haddington. The Liberal candidate was a recently retired Indian civil servant, 56-year-old Sidney Daniels, rather than the previous Liberal MP, Frank Raffety who had been selected to contest Cheltenham at the pending General Election. Daniels had spent 33 years in India before returning to England to practice law in 1928. This was his first parliamentary election. The Labour candidate was a barrister and journalist, George Gilbert Desmond.

== Campaign ==
Polling Day was fixed for 21 March 1929, just 38 days after the death of the former MP. This left little time for campaigning. Since a general election was due in May and the Liberal and Labour parties were not strong in the constituency, little effort was put into the campaign. On 1 March, nationally, Liberal leader, David Lloyd George launched the Liberal programme for the upcoming General election, titled We Can Conquer Unemployment.

== Result ==
On polling day, news came through of a Liberal by-election victory at Eddisbury the day before, however this news came too late to influence the campaign. The Unionists held the seat with a reduced majority;

Bath by-election, 1929
Party	Candidate	Votes	%	±%
Unionist	Charles Baillie-Hamilton	11,171	45.1	−10.7
Liberal	Sidney Reginald Daniels	7,255	29.3	−1.3
Labour	George Gilbert Desmond	6,359	25.7	+12.1
Majority		3,916	15.8	−9.4
Turnout		24,785	72.8	−11.7
Unionist hold		Swing	-4.6	

== Aftermath ==
All three fought the seat in the general election in May with a similar outcome;

General election 30 May 1929: Electorate 46,877
Party	Candidate	Votes	%	±%
Unionist	Charles Baillie-Hamilton	17,845	46.9	+1.8
Liberal	Sidney Reginald Daniels	11,485	30.1	+0.8
Labour	George Gilbert Desmond	8,769	23.0	−2.7
Majority		6,360	16.8	+1.0
Turnout		38,099	81.3	+8.5
Unionist hold		Swing	+0.5	
