= George Gilbert Desmond =

British barrister, author, and activist

George Gilbert Desmond (born Jones; 16 April 1867 – 3 October 1963) was a British barrister, author, and political activist.

Born in Brockworth, Desmond was the son of Henry Yates Jones, a gentleman farmer, and his wife, Elizabeth Buckle. In 1889, he changed his surname from Jones to Desmond.

He was educated at Bristol Grammar School and St John's College, Cambridge (B.A., 1894), afterwards becoming a barrister with Middle Temple. He contributed the "Nature Notes" column to the Daily News, and also wrote a number of children's books, including Bertha Stories, Snow Sprites, Ring of Nature and Roll of the Seasons.

Desmond volunteered to fight in World War I, but was captured and became a prisoner-of-war. On release, he worked as a war correspondent for the Daily News, then as a special correspondent for the paper in Berlin.

Desmond also joined the Independent Labour Party (ILP), writing for New Leader. The ILP was affiliated to the Labour Party, and Desmond was chair of the Stroud Constituency Labour Party from 1920 to 1922. At the 1924 UK general election, he stood unsuccessfully in Petersfield. In 1926/27, he was the chair of the South Western Division of the ILP. Desmond stood for Labour in the 1929 Bath by-election, improving the party's vote, but taking only third place. He stood again in the 1929, 1931 and 1935 UK general elections, taking third place each time, and was adopted as Prospective Parliamentary Candidate for the election expected in 1939 or 1940. He was put under pressure to withdraw in support of a Liberal Party candidate who backed the Popular Front, but did not do so. However, no election was held, due to the outbreak of World War II.
