= Álvaro Guevara =

Chilean artist, drafter and boxer (1894–1951)

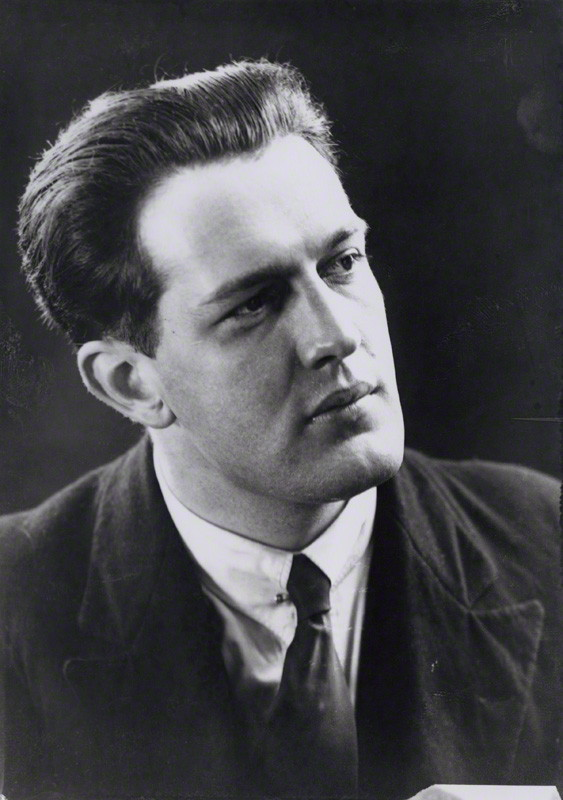
- Álvaro photographed by George Charles Beresford, 1920
- Born: Álvaro Guevara Reimers; 5 July 1894; Valparaíso, Chile
- Died: 16 October 1951 (aged 57); Aix-en-Provence, France
- Other name: Chile Guevara
- Education: Bradford Technical College; Bradford College of Art; Slade School of Fine Art, 1916
- Spouse: Méraud Guinness (m. 1929, separated)
- Children: 1
- Family: Guinness family
- Boxing career
- Weight: Middleweight

Álvaro Guevara Reimers (5 July 1894 – 16 October 1951), known in Europe as Chile Guevara, was a Chilean painter, drafter and boxer active in London and France. In 1920, Guevara became the youngest painter and the first Latin American to have artwork at the Tate Modern.

== Early life and education ==
Guevara was born on 5 July 1894 (Note: Also cited as 10 July 1894 and 13 July 1894.) in Valparaíso to Luis Guevara Arias (Note: Also cited as Luis Ladrón de Guevara.) (c. 1840–1912), a wool exporter and Anglophile, and Ida Juana María Reimers de Guevara (née Reimers Bode; 1857–1943). The tenth of twelve children, Guevara grew up at his families home in Valparaíso, which later destroyed in the 1906 earthquake, and a country estate in Arauco Province.

Guevara's elder brother, Lucho, ran the family's business interests in Yorkshire and at his suggestion Guevara and his two youngest sisters were sent to England in 1910. Both of Guevara's parents moved to Harrogate shortly afterwards, and lived at the Majestic Hotel. Sent to Bradford, Guevara studied textiles at Bradford Technical College.

During this period Guevara developed an interest in painting and began secretly attending evening classes at the Bradford College of Art. (Note: Part of Bradford Technical College.) Guevara's interest in painting was encouraged by Lucho's friends William Rothenstein and Albert Rutherston. In 1912, Guevara was awarded a scholarship to the Slade School of Fine Art. Guevara appears to have shown such serious anti-semitic attitudes whilst studying at the Slade that he was beaten up twice by fellow Jewish students, David Bomberg and Jacob Kramer for his bullying of Isaac Rosenberg. Guevara graduated in 1916.

== Career ==
In 1916, Guevara painted a portrait of Edith Sitwell entitled "Dame Edith Sitwell". According to Diana Holman-Hunt, Guevara and Sitwell shared a non-physical but "romantic and spiritual" relationship. The painting was later purchased by the Tate Modern through the National Art Collections Fund in 1920, making Guevara the youngest painter and the first Latin American to have artwork within the galleries collection.

Associated with the Bloomsbury Group, Guevara held a sole show at the Omega Workshops.

=== Chile ===
In 1923, (Note: Also cited as 1922.) Guevara settled in Viña del Mar where he opened an atelier. The same year Guevara exhibited five paintings at the Official Salon, where the avant-garde nature of his work received a negative reception. In 1925, Guevara travelled to Southern Chile to paint Mapuche life and the landscapes of Wallmapu.

During his time in Chile, Guevara became known as a boxer. In 1924, Guevara won the Valparaíso boxing championship against Zózimo López in the middleweight category.

=== Europe ===
In 1926, Guevara returned to London with around 50 paintings and later exhibited 34 of them at Leicester Galleries in November. In 1927, Guevara settled in Paris. Following his marriage to Méraud Guinness in 1929, the couple settled in Aix-en-Provence.

In 1940, a large number of Guevara's paintings were destroyed during a German airstrike. (Note: Cited as happening in either London or France.) In 1941, Guevara was arrested by the Gestapo and his work was confiscated. Guevara was held at a concentration camp until he was able to return to Chile in 1943. According to Pablo Neruda, Guevara never physically recovered from his imprisonment.

In 1945, Guevara returned to London as an Honorary Consul for Chile before later becoming the cultural attaché for Switzerland the following year. In 1948, Guevara returned to Aix-en-Provence.

In 1954, Guevara's "Dictionnaire Intuitif" was posthumously published.

== Personal life ==
Guevara was known to have had relationships with men and women, including with Nancy Cunard.

In 1929, Guevara married Meraud Guinness, a painter and member of the Guinness family. Guevara and Guinness had one daughter, Alladine Guevara, before later separating.

On 16 October 1951 Guevara died of cancer in Aix-en-Provence, aged 57.
