= Lindy Hamilton-Temple-Blackwood, Marchioness of Dufferin and Ava =

British conservationist (1941–2020)

The Most Honourable The Marchioness of Dufferin and Ava
- Other names: Lindy Guinness
- Born: Serena Belinda Rosemary Guinness; 25 March 1941; Prestwick, Scotland
- Died: 26 October 2020 (aged 79); Belfast, Northern Ireland
- Spouse: The 5th Marquess of Dufferin and Ava (m. 1964; died 1988)
- Parents: Loel Guinness; Lady Isabel Manners
- Occupation: Artist, conservationist

Serena Belinda Rosemary Hamilton-Temple-Blackwood, Marchioness of Dufferin and Ava (née Guinness; 25 March 1941 – 26 October 2020), also known as Lindy Dufferin or Lindy Guinness, was a British artist, conservationist and businesswoman. She was married to the fifth Marquess from 1964 until his death in 1988.

== Early life and artistic career ==
Born in Prestwick, Ayrshire, Scotland, Guinness was the daughter of financier Loel Guinness and his second wife, Lady Isabel (née Manners), daughter of the 9th Duke of Rutland and Kathleen, Duchess of Rutland. She had an older brother, William Loel Guinness (born 1939). She had an older half-brother, Patrick Benjamin 'Tara' Guinness (1931-1965), from her father's first marriage to Hon. Joan Yarde-Butler, daughter of the 3rd Baron Churston. Tara Guinness married his stepsister, Dolores Maria Agatha Wilhelmine Luise von Fürstenberg, daughter of his father's third wife, but was killed in a car crash. When Lindy was 9 years old, her parents divorced; her father married Mexican beauty Gloria Rubio in 1951, and her mother married Sir Robert Throckmorton, 11th baronet, two years later.

She grew up in Belvoir Castle, the family seat of the Dukes of Rutland. Her father and stepmother took her to Palm Beach for the winters, where she spent time with Rubio's close friend Truman Capote. As a girl, she became a passionate artist and studied painting under Oskar Kokoschka, as well as Duncan Grant and Sir William Coldstream. She was mentored by Grant for a decade from the age of 17 at Charleston in Sussex, a house associated with the Bloomsbury Group. She formally studied at the Byam Shaw School of Art, the Chelsea School of Art and the Slade. Eventually, exhibiting as Lindy Guinness, she had over 20 shows in London, Dublin, Paris and New York. Her work was in multiple styles from realist to abstract and Cubist.

== Marriage ==
She married Sheridan Hamilton-Temple-Blackwood, 5th and last Marquess of Dufferin and Ava, her fourth cousin (through their great-grandfather, the 1st Earl of Iveagh), at Westminster Abbey on 21 October 1964. Princess Margaret was among the 2,000 people in attendance, and the 9th Earl of Arran, then Viscount Sudley, was the best man. Lindy wore a dress by John Cavanagh and the Dufferin and Ava shamrock tiara.

Sheridan was also an art enthusiast and opened a gallery in London. The Dufferins' Holland Park mansion was a popular gathering for London's "aristo-bohemian set" during the 1960s and 1970s. "We used to give endless parties," she told W magazine in 2009. "They had this kind of innocence and openness about them. There was no sort of formality." The marquess, who The Independent described as "flamboyant and basically homosexual", died of an AIDS-related illness in 1988.

In his will, Lord Dufferin bequeathed Clandeboye, the 2,000-acre family estate in Bangor, County Down, Northern Ireland, to his widow. Nervous about moving to Northern Ireland during the Troubles, she became active in conservation issues as a way to bring people together. She invited an environmental group, BTCV (known as Conservation Volunteers Northern Ireland within the region), later renamed as The Conservation Volunteers, to open its first Northern Ireland branch. "I thought this was a way to bring the estate back to its historic position of being the centre of the community." The estate includes a large herd of heifers, and in 2009, Dufferin launched Clandeboye Estate Yoghurt, then the only yoghurt producer in Northern Ireland.

She also opened an art gallery, the Ava Gallery, and kept the estate self-sufficient through various other enterprises, including a golf course and banquet hall for weddings.

She died on 26 October 2020 at Belfast City Hospital after a short illness, aged 79.
