= Montagu Corry, 1st Baron Rowton =

British philanthropist (1838–1903)

The Right Honourable The Lord Rowton KCVO CB PC DL
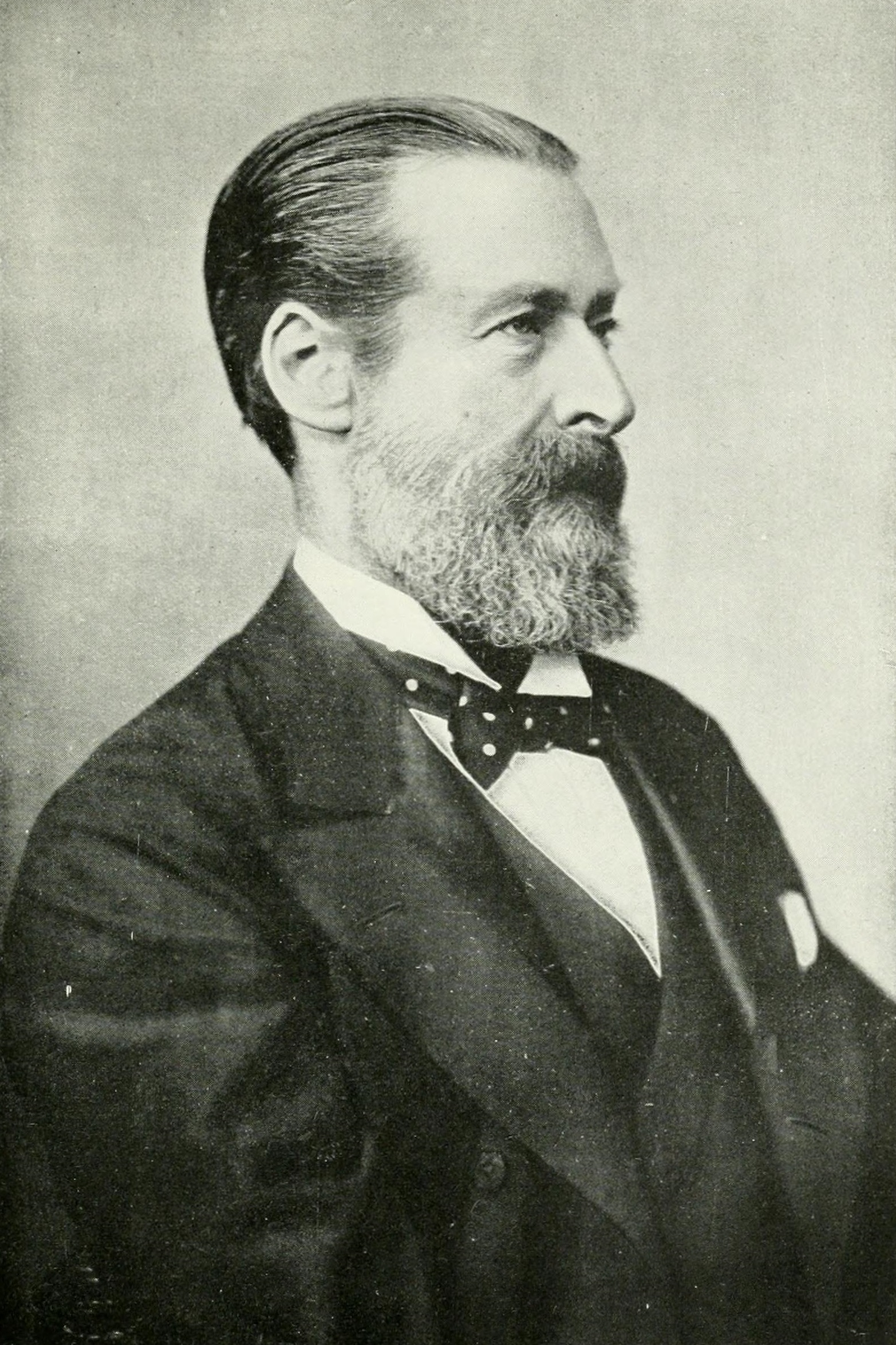
- Lord Rowton

Private Secretary to the Prime Minister of the United Kingdom
- In office 1868–1868
- Prime Minister: Benjamin Disraeli
- In office 1874–1880
- Prime Minister: Benjamin Disraeli (Earl of Beaconsfield from 1876)

Personal details
- Born: Montagu William Lowry-Corry; 8 October 1838 London
- Died: 9 November 1903 (aged 65)
- Education: Trinity College, Cambridge

Montagu William Lowry-Corry, 1st Baron Rowton, KCVO, CB, PC, DL (8 October 1838 – 9 November 1903), also known as "Monty", was a British philanthropist and public servant, best known for serving as Benjamin Disraeli's private secretary from 1866 until the latter's death in 1881.

== Background and education ==
Born in Grosvenor Square, London, Lowry-Corry was the second son of the Honourable Henry Lowry-Corry by his wife Lady Harriet, daughter of the 6th Earl of Shaftesbury. The social reformer, the 7th Earl of Shaftesbury, was his maternal uncle. He was educated at Harrow and at Trinity College, Cambridge, and was called to the Bar in 1863. He practised for three years on the Oxford Circuit.

== Career ==
Lowry-Corry's father, a younger son of Somerset Lowry-Corry, 2nd Earl Belmore, represented County Tyrone in parliament continuously for forty-seven years (1826–1873), and was a member of Lord Derby's third ministry (1866–1868) as Vice-President of the Council and afterwards as First Lord of the Admiralty. Lowry-Corry was thus brought up in close touch with Conservative party politics, but it is said to have been his winning personality and social accomplishments rather than his political connections that recommended him to the favourable notice of Benjamin Disraeli, who in 1866 made Lowry-Corry his private secretary. From this time till the statesman's death in 1881 Corry maintained his connection with Disraeli, the relations between the two men being more intimate and confidential than usually subsist between a private secretary and his political chief.

When Disraeli resigned office in 1868 Lowry-Corry declined various offers of public employment to be free to continue his services, now unpaid, to the Conservative leader. When the latter returned to power in 1874, Corry resumed his position as official private secretary to the prime minister. He accompanied Disraeli (who in 1876 had been ennobled as Earl of Beaconsfield) to the Congress of Berlin in 1878, where he acted as one of the secretaries of the special embassy of Great Britain. In the latter year he was awarded the CB, in the Civil Division.

On the defeat of the Conservatives in 1880, Corry was raised to the peerage as Baron Rowton, of Rowton Castle in the County of Shropshire on 6 May 1880, which was then his country residence and ultimately inherited in 1889 from his maternal aunt, Lady Charlotte Barbara Lyster. He was a DL and JP for the same county.

Lord Rowton was in Algiers when Beaconsfield was stricken with his last illness in the spring of 1881; but returning post-haste across Europe, he was present at the death-bed of his old chief. Beaconsfield bequeathed to Rowton all his correspondence and other papers. In 1897 he was made KCVO and in 1900 he was sworn of the Privy Council.

Lord Rowton is also well-remembered as a philanthropist as the originator of the Rowton Houses, six large hostels for working men which were much better than existing lodging houses. He was inspired by projects of that kind founded by Lord Iveagh in Dublin and at the time of his death was chairman of both the Rowton Houses Company and the Guinness Trust. In 1890 he served as treasurer of the Salop Infirmary in Shrewsbury.

== Personal life ==
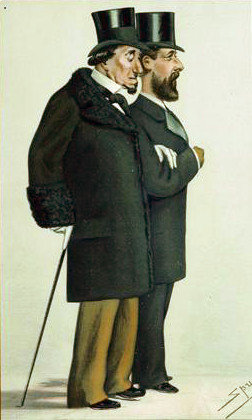
Lord Rowton (right) with his master, Benjamin Disraeli

Lord Rowton never married. He is alleged to have had an affair with Violet, Marchioness of Granby, and also alleged to be the father of Lady Violet Manners, legally the second daughter of her mother's husband, the 8th Duke of Rutland. Lady Violet, known as Letty, married firstly Hugo Charteris, Lord Elcho (killed in action 1916), and was mother of two sons, the 12th Earl of Wemyss and Lord Charteris of Amisfield.

Lord Rowton died at his London home in Berkeley Square in November 1903, aged 65. He was buried in Kensal Green Cemetery, and is also commemorated by a plaque at St Michael's Parish Church, Alberbury, in whose parish Rowton Castle lies.

Peerage of the United Kingdom
New creation	Baron Rowton; 1880–1903	Extinct
