= Lord Thomas and Lady Margaret =

Traditional song

Lord Thomas and Lady Margaret or Clerk Tamas (and Fair Annie) (Child ballad # 260; Roud # 109) is a traditional folk song.

== Synopsis ==
Lord Thomas, or Clerk Tamas, sees Lady Margaret, or fair Annie, in the woods and, although she was in love with him, hunts her like a deer. She meets a man (riding, or a sea captain), and he protects her if she will marry him.

The man comes to her house after the marriage, either begging or to see her. He offers for her, in one variants saying he will kill her husband. She poisons their wine and is careful not to drink any from her cup. While he is dying, she tells him she will arrange for his proper burial, which is more than he would have done for her.

== See also ==
- Lady Isabel
