= Anthony Marreco =

British lawyer

Tony Marreco
- Born: Anthony Blechynden Freire Marreco; 19 August 1915
- Died: 4 June 2006 (aged 90)
- Education: Westminster School; Royal Academy of Dramatic Art
- Spouses: Lady Ursula Manners (m. 1943; div. 1948) Regina de Souza Coelho (m. 1955; div. 1961) (m. 2004) Anne Wignall (m. 1961; died 1982)
- Partner: Lally Horstmann (1951–1954, her death)

Anthony (Tony) Freire Marreco (9 August 1915 – 4 June 2006) was a British barrister. He was Junior Counsel at the Nuremberg trials, and later a founding director of Amnesty International. He was also known for his romantic liaisons, marrying four times and having numerous other affairs.

== Early life ==
Marreco was the only son of Geoffrey Freire Marreco, of St Mawes in Cornwall. Marreco's family were of Portuguese descent, although his great-grandfather Antonio Joaquim Freire Marreco (1787–1850) had become a naturalised British subject, establishing himself in business in England in the early 1820s as a wine importer. He was educated at Westminster School, where he met Mahatma Gandhi and T. E. Lawrence. He then attended RADA but was expelled when he missed lessons to attend the Derby.

== Career ==
In the Second World War, Marreco was commissioned in the RNVR in 1940, serving as a Lieutenant Commander in the Fleet Air Arm until 1946. He served on the staff of the Commander-in-Chief of the Home Fleet, and on HMS Formidable.

Marreco was called to the Bar at Inner Temple in 1941. The Attorney-General, Sir Hartley Shawcross, was a friend of his father, and he invited Marreco to become Junior Counsel in the British Delegation at the International Military Tribunal at Nuremberg, also known as the Nuremberg War Crimes Tribunal, in 1945 and 1946. He continued to serve as an adviser in post-War Germany, until 1949, but never returned to the bar.

Marreco stood as a Liberal Party candidate for Wells in the 1950 general election. He then stood at Goole in the 1951 general election. He was later a director of publishing company Weidenfeld and Nicolson and a banker with SG Warburg.

He lent his support to Peter Benenson, the son of his neighbour in London, as when Benenson founded Amnesty International in 1960, but resigned as treasurer in 1971 when Amnesty refused to investigate reports of torture by British troops in Northern Ireland.

Marreco maintained homes at Porthall, a Georgian house near Lifford in County Donegal where he bred Charollais cattle, and in Shepherd Market in Mayfair in London. In later years, he retired to Aldbourne in Wiltshire.

== Personal life ==
He was married four times, but also had numerous affairs with other women. He married Lady Ursula Manners, eldest daughter of the 9th Duke of Rutland and Kathleen Tennant, in 1943, but they divorced in 1948. While serving in Germany, he became the lover of Lally Horstmann (daughter of banker Paul von Schwabach), then aged 47, the widow of German Ambassador Alfred Horstmann. He then became involved with Louise de Vilmorin through the late 1940s until 1951. He reestablished his relationship with Lally Horstmann in 1951, joining her in South America and remaining with her until she died in August 1954, when he inherited part of her fortune. He later took up with Loelia, Duchess of Westminster episodically in the 1950s.

In 1954 while in Brazil for SG Warburg, Marreco met Regina (Gina) de Souza Coelho (b. 1927), only daughter of Dr. Roberto de Souza Coelho, of Rio de Janeiro. They married in 1955, but the marriage was dissolved in 1961. He married for a third time later that year to Anne Wignall (née Acland-Troyte), formerly the wife of the 5th Baron Ebury. She died in 1982, and he resumed his relationship with his second wife in 1990, buying a cottage in Aldbourne, Wiltshire in 1997 and remarrying her in 2004.
