= Violet Manners, Duchess of Rutland =

British artist and noblewoman (1856–1937)

Her Grace The Duchess of Rutland
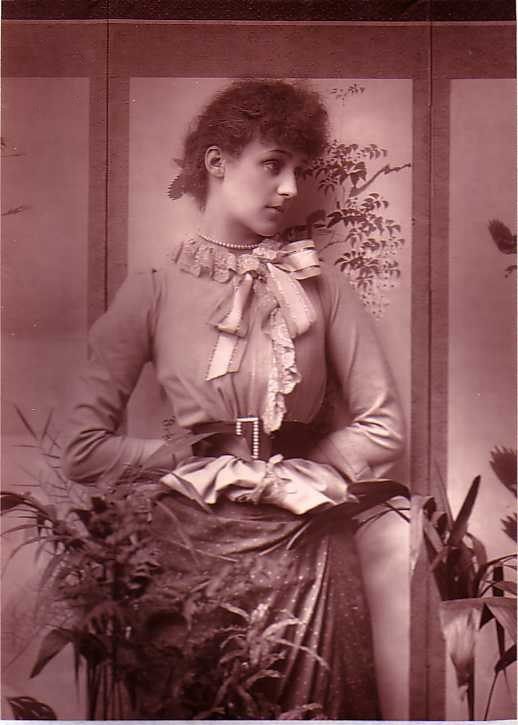
- Portrait of Violet Manners, Marchioness of Granby
- Born: Marion Margaret Violet Lindsay; 7 March 1856
- Died: 22 December 1937 (aged 81); Chapel Street, London
- Resting place: Belvoir Castle, Leicestershire
- Spouse: Henry Manners, 8th Duke of Rutland
- Children: Marjorie Paget, Marchioness of Anglesey; Robert Manners, Lord Haddon; John Manners, 9th Duke of Rutland; Violet Charteris, Lady Elcho; Diana Cooper, Viscountess Norwich
- Parents: Charles Lindsay (father); Emilia Anne Browne (mother)
- Relatives: Henry Lindsay (brother); James Lindsay, 24th Earl of Crawford (paternal grandfather); Montague Browne (maternal grandfather)

Marion Margaret Violet Manners, Duchess of Rutland (née Lindsay; 7 March 1856 – 22 December 1937) was a British artist and noblewoman. A granddaughter of the 24th Earl of Crawford, she married Henry Manners in 1882. She was styled the Marchioness of Granby from 1888 to 1906, when Manners succeeded as Duke of Rutland. She had five children, including John Manners, the 9th Duke of Rutland, and the socialite Lady Diana Cooper.

Though not formally trained, she created and exhibited portraits of her social circle and became involved in sculpture later in life. She was associated with The Souls, a group known for its cultural interests, and was often portrayed in art. In 2016, a portrait of her by G. F. Watts was acquired by the Watts Gallery Trust, prompting her grandson, historian John Julius Norwich, to donate a collection of her drawings.

== Early life and family ==
Marion Margaret Violet Lindsay was born on 7 March 1856 to an aristocratic family, being the youngest of three children and the only daughter of the Hon. Charles Hugh Lindsay and his wife Emilia Anne Browne.

Her father was a younger son of James Lindsay, 24th Earl of Crawford, whilst her mother was a daughter of Montague Browne, the dean of Lismore.

== Marriage and issue ==
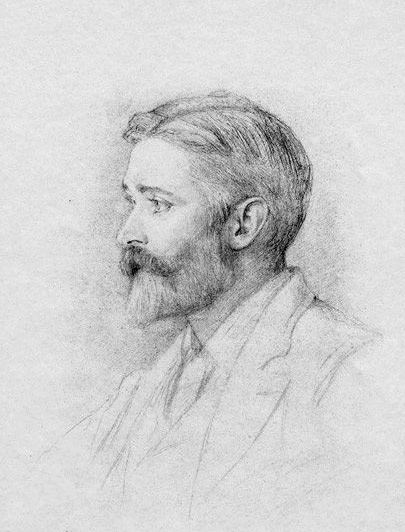
Henry Manners, by Violet Manners

At the age of 26, she married Henry Manners on 25 November 1882. He was the only son and heir of John Manners, 7th Duke of Rutland. Husband and wife had little in common; the handsome Henry was a political Conservative whilst Violet was described as "bohemian". She provided him with two male heirs, but her second and third daughters were possibly fathered by others: Lady Violet by Montagu Corry, 1st Baron Rowton, and Lady Diana by Harry Cust. The couple also moved in different social circles, as he enjoyed hunting and she pursued more intellectual interests.

Henry became the Marquess of Granby in 1888. In 1906, he succeeded his father as the 8th Duke of Rutland; Lady Granby became the Duchess of Rutland.

The couple had five children:

- Lady Victoria Marjorie Harriet Manners (1883–1946), married Charles Paget, 6th Marquess of Anglesey, and had issue;
- Robert Charles John Manners, Lord Haddon (1885–1894), died young;
- John Henry Montagu Manners, 9th Duke of Rutland (1886–1940), married Kathleen Tennant and had issue;
- Lady Violet Catherine Manners (1888–1971), she married firstly, Hugo Charteris, Lord Elcho, son of Hugo Charteris, 11th Earl of Wemyss, and had issue. She married secondly, Guy Benson;
- Lady Diana Olivia Winifred Maud Manners (1892–1986), (Note: Lady Diana has said that although she was raised as a daughter of the 8th Duke of Rutland, she was actually fathered by Harry Cust, a Lincolnshire landowner and MP.) married Duff Cooper, 1st Viscount Norwich, and had issue.

== Career as artist ==
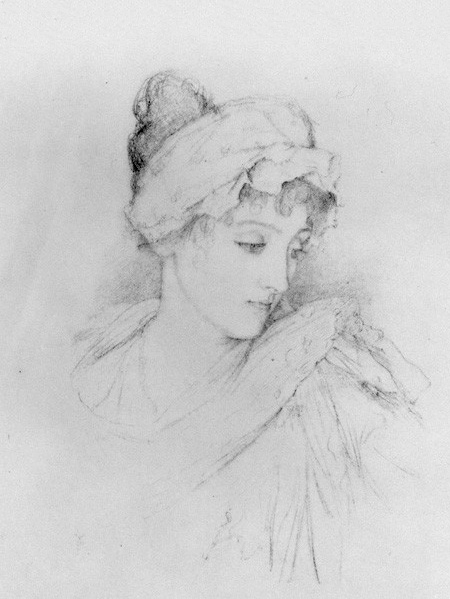
Lithograph of Norah Lindsay by Violet Manners, 1897

Violet was privately educated as a young girl, and her family encouraged her interest in art. While she had no formal training as an artist, she did spend a significant period of time on a visit to Italy.

In 1877, she exhibited some of her drawings and sculptures at the Grosvenor Gallery, which was opened by her cousin Coutts Lindsay. She considered herself to be a professional, but her rank and gender limited her; many considered her to be merely a dilettante.

Her most successful works centred on depicting members of her social circle. During her lifetime, Violet's works were on display at the main British art galleries such as the Royal Academy of Arts and the New Gallery, and also abroad in the US and France. She exhibited her work at the Palace of Fine Arts at the 1893 World's Columbian Exposition in Chicago, Illinois.

In 1925, one commentary opined that Violet's style "is particularly suited to the interpretation of feminine beauty and elegance, but she usually achieves considerable success in her delineations of men."

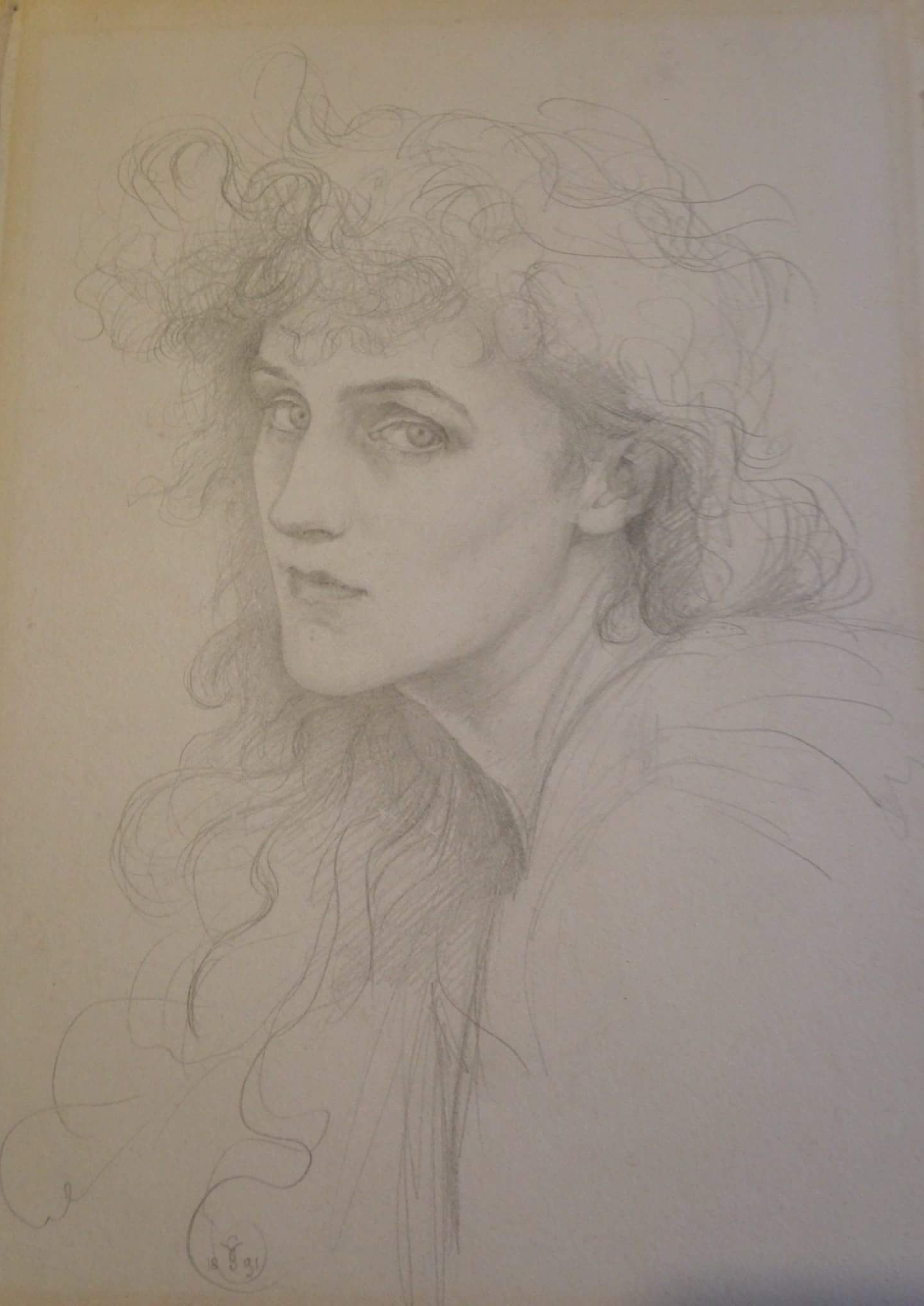
Self-portrait pencil drawing of Violet, Duchess of Rutland, 1891

Violet was a friend of the Scottish sculptor William Reid Dick, and helped him secure many aristocratic commissions.

After her eldest son's 1894 death at the age of nine, the grieving Violet began sculpting; one of her works was displayed on the boy's tomb in Belvoir Castle. She considered another statue's base, which displayed her son and other members of her family, to be her greatest work. She kept it in her London house until 1937, when the Tate Gallery acquired it. In 1900, she published Portraits of Men and Women, a selection of portraits that depicted members of her social circle.

Violet was a prominent member of The Souls, an aristocratic social circle that favoured intellectual pursuits and avant-garde artistic tastes. Formed in the 1880s, other members included Arthur Balfour and George Wyndham. The contemporary women's magazine The Lady's Realm said that Violet was "the acknowledged 'queen' of the society," who, as one of its original members, possessed "beauty, [an] unusual ability in all artistic abilities, and [a] grasp of social and economic questions [that] marked her out from the beginning as a leader."

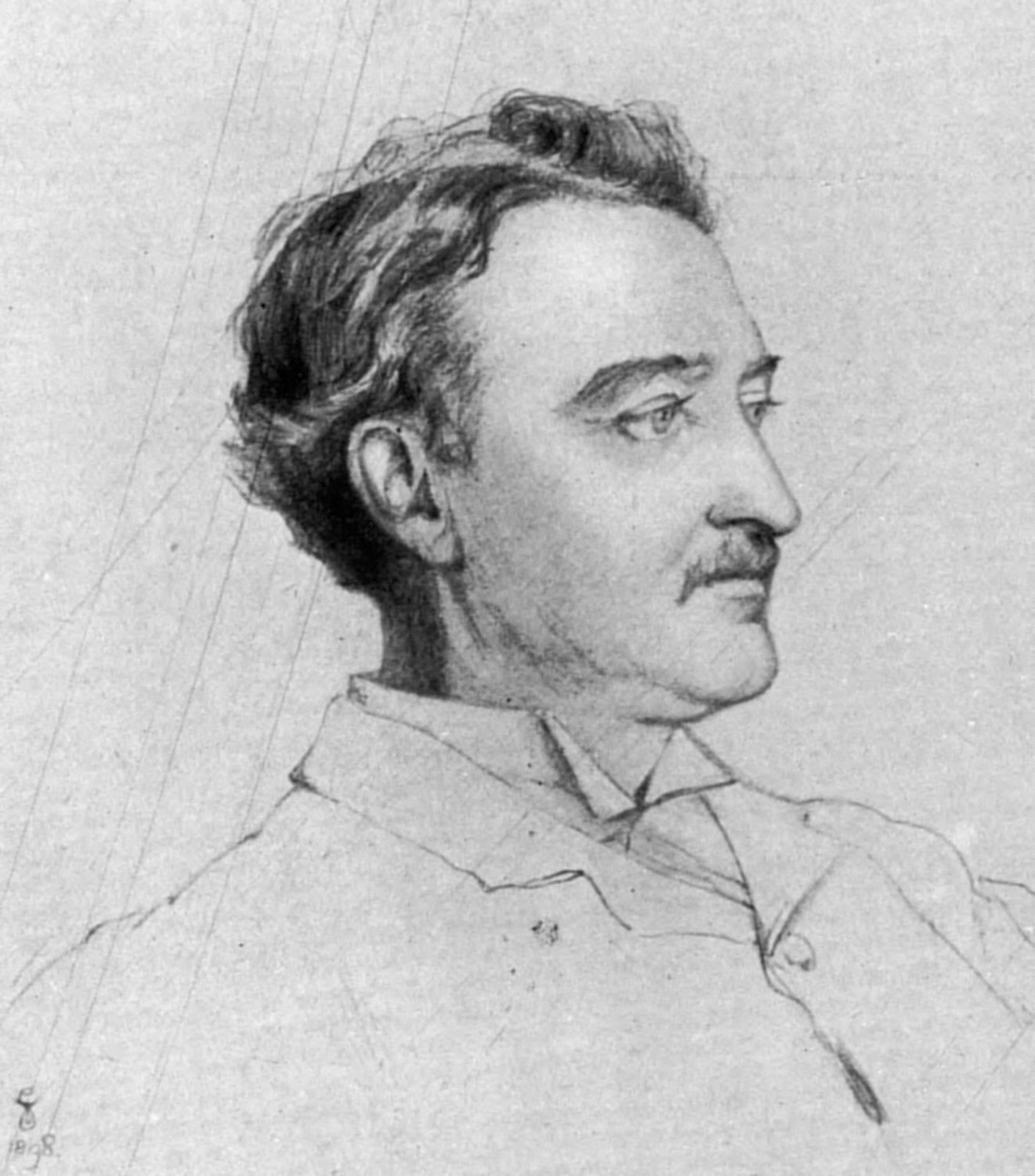
Sketch of Cecil Rhodes by Violet Manners

Violet was a noted beauty, as was her daughter Lady Diana. The Duchess was painted on numerous occasions by James Jebusa Shannon and George Frederic Watts. The historian K. D. Reynolds writes that her beauty "was of the type most admired by the Souls. Her auburn hair, pale complexion, hooded eyes, and very slim figure were invariably set off by her Aesthetic-style clothes of faded colours and soft drapings."

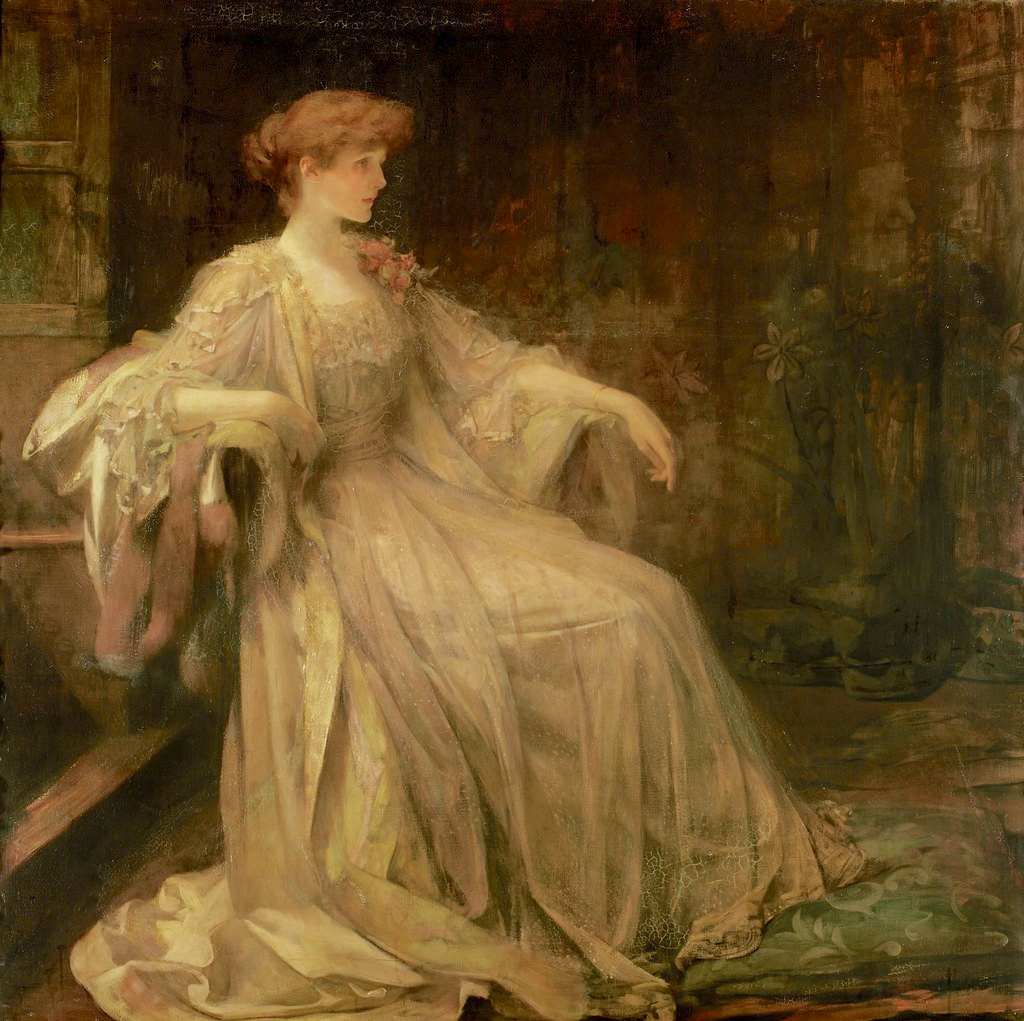
James Jebusa Shannon - Portrait of Violet, Marchioness of Granby, 1895, Private collection

She kept a studio at the Rutland estate of Bute House.

== Later life and death ==
During World War I, the Duchess converted her London house at 16 Arlington Street into a hospital. Her daughter Diana, a prominent socialite, served as a nurse at the house. Violet's son-in-law, Hugo Charteris, Lord Elcho, died during the war, though her only surviving son was spared from fighting at the front.

The Duke of Rutland died in 1925, and was succeeded in the dukedom by their second and only surviving son, John.

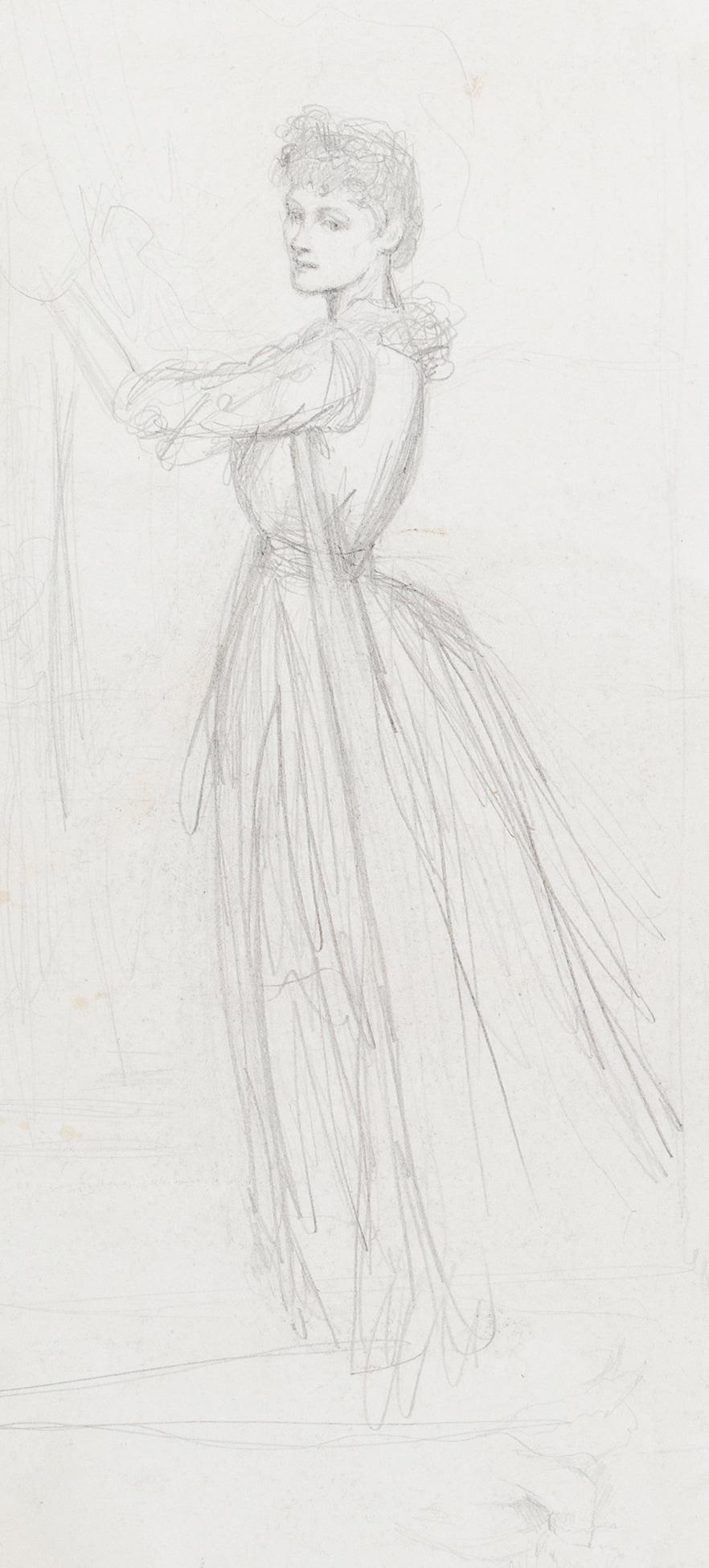
Self study at the easel (pencil, circa 1895)

After her husband's death, Violet moved to Belgrave Square, London and built a new studio to work on her art. In March 1933, the director of the Leeds Art Gallery, John Rothenstein, and his wife (later Sir John and Lady Rothenstein) gave a reception party in her honour in the gallery's curator's rooms where amongst the 180 guests was her daughter, Lady Diana Cooper, Lady Baillie and Mrs Noel Middleton.

The Duchess continued exhibiting her works up to her death; her last exhibit was in November 1937, and she died the following month after an operation.

The Duchess of Rutland died on 22 December 1937 and was buried at Belvoir Castle, Leicestershire.
