= Lady Isabel =

Traditional song

"Lady Isabel" is an English ballad known as Child Ballad 261 and Roud #3884.

== Synopsis ==
Her stepmother says that Lady Isabel is said to be her father's whore, and cites that he dresses his daughter better than her, his wife. Isabel denies it, says their clothing befits their ages, and claims a lover beyond the sea. Her stepmother offers her a poisoned drink; she puts it to her own lips but is careful not to drink a drop, and gives it to Isabel, who drinks and dies. She curses her stepmother, saying she will go to heaven and her stepmother to hell; her stepmother goes mad.

== Bibliography ==
- Marcello Sorce Keller, "Sul castel di mirabel: Life of a Ballad in Oral Tradition and Choral Practice", Ethnomusicology, XXX (1986), no. 3, 449-469.

== See also ==
- List of the Child Ballads
- Lord Thomas and Lady Margaret
