= Charles Baillie-Hamilton (Bath MP) =

British member of parliament (1900–1939)

Charles William Baillie-Hamilton (22 May 1900 – 24 April 1939) was a British Conservative politician.

== Background and education ==
Baillie-Hamilton was the younger son of army officer George Baillie-Hamilton, Lord Binning and grandson of the 11th Earl of Haddington. He went to Eton, where he was head boy, and then to University College, Oxford.

== Political career ==
For some time Baillie-Hamilton worked for the Conservative party and was a private secretary to Stanley Baldwin. He also worked on the East Africa Commission with Hilton Young. In the 1924 general election he was the Conservative candidate for Peebles and South Midlothian which was won by Labour.

In 1929 he won the constituency of Bath in a by-election and held the seat with an increased majority in the general election which followed shortly afterwards. In May 1930 he made his maiden speech, on subsidies for the aircraft industry, and did not speak again. For the election of 1931, the Bath Conservatives rejected him as their candidate and forced him to stand down over his poor voting record and few visits to the constituency. In response, he produced a letter from the party's Chief Whip to show that he had voted in 22 out of 24 three-line whips, and stated that he had visited 37 times in the previous year.

== Personal life ==
In July 1929, Baillie-Hamilton married Wanda Holden, daughter of financier Major Norman Holden OBE, son of the Liberal politician Sir Edward Holden. She was described in the press as 'one of the most admired débutantes of the last season', with a 'vivacious personality'. They were divorced in November 1932 in an uncontested claim of her adultery with the actor John Loder. Baillie-Hamilton died in April 1939 at the age of 38 and was buried in Tynighame, East Lothian, Scotland.

Parliament of the United Kingdom
Preceded by Charles Foxcroft	Member of Parliament for Bath; 1929–1931	Succeeded by Loel Guinness
