= Henry Manners, 8th Duke of Rutland =

British politician (1852–1925)

His Grace The Duke of Rutland KG TD
- Portrait by Walter Stoneman, c. 1916

Lord Lieutenant of Leicestershire
- In office 1900–1925
- Monarchs: Victoria; Edward VII; George V
- Preceded by: The Earl Howe
- Succeeded by: Sir Arthur Hazlerigg

Personal details
- Born: Henry John Brinsley Manners; 16 April 1852 Mayfair, London
- Died: 8 May 1925 (aged 73) St James's, London
- Party: Conservative
- Spouse: Violet Lindsay (m. 1882)
- Children: Victoria Paget, Marchioness of Anglesey; Robert Manners, Lord Haddon; John Manners, 9th Duke of Rutland; Violet Charteris, Lady Elcho; Diana Cooper, Viscountess Norwich
- Parent(s): John Manners, 7th Duke of Rutland; Catherine Marley

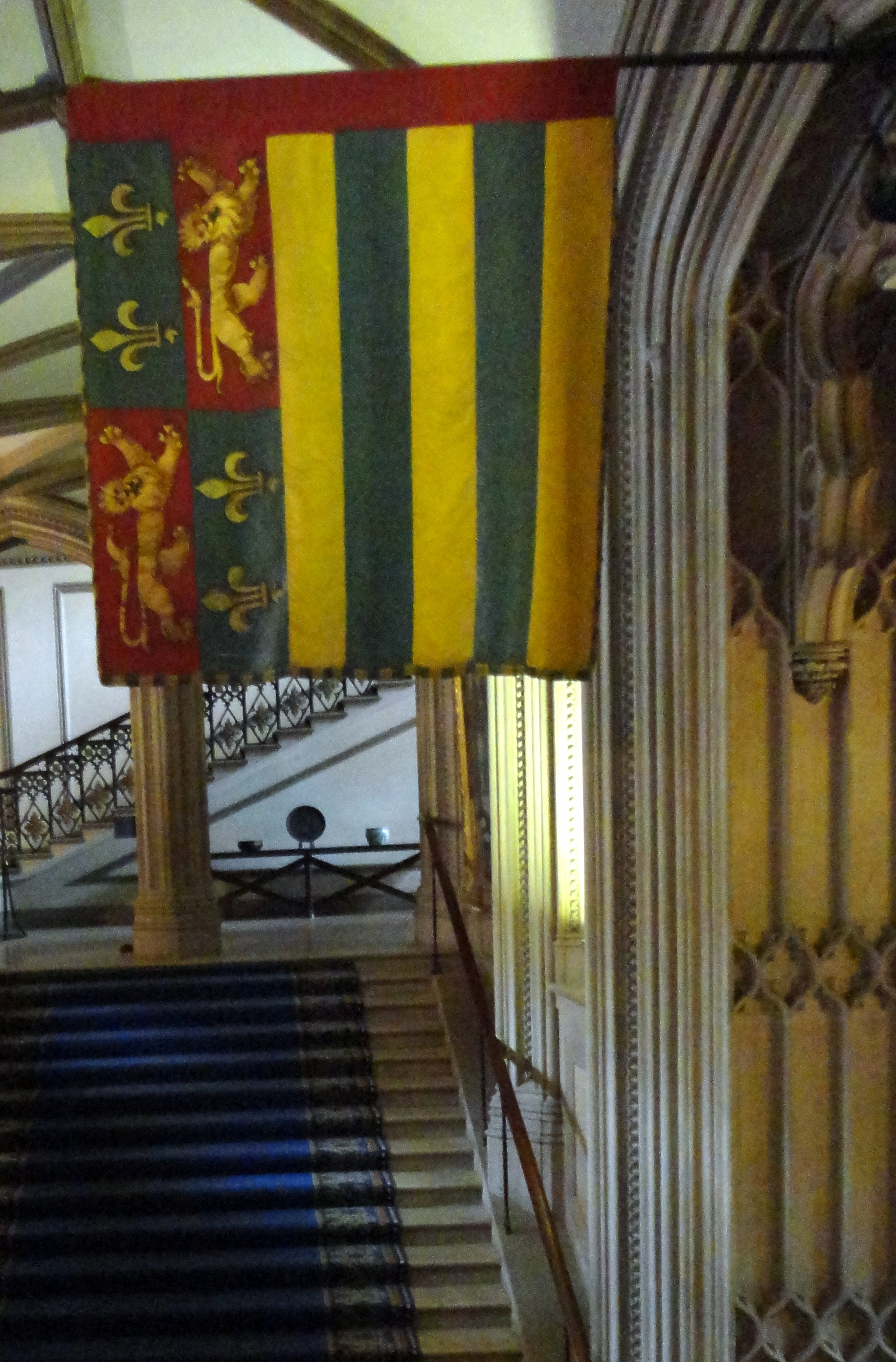
The 8th Duke of Rutland's banner as Knight Companion of the Garter, now on display at Belvoir Castle

Henry John Brinsley Manners, 8th Duke of Rutland, KG, TD (16 April 1852 – 8 May 1925), styled Marquess of Granby between 1888 and 1906, was a British peer and Conservative politician.

== Early life and education ==
Rutland was born at Upper Brook Street, Grosvenor Square, Mayfair, the only surviving child of Lord John Manners by his first wife, Catherine Marley, daughter of Colonel George Marley of Belvedere House, County Westmeath, Ireland. Just before Rutland's second birthday, his mother died aged 23 from childbirth complications, weeks after giving birth to a daughter, Edith Katharine Mary, who lived only 12 days.

In 1862, his father remarried to Janetta Hughan. He had four half-siblings from his father's second marriage, including Lord Edward Manners and Lord Cecil Manners. He gained the courtesy title of Marquess of Granby in 1888 when his father succeeded his elder brother in the dukedom.

He was educated at Eton and Trinity College, Cambridge.

== Career ==
From 1885–88, Rutland was principal private secretary to the Prime Minister Marquess of Salisbury.

In 1888, when his father inherited the Dukedom and took his place in the House of Lords, Rutland succeeded him as Member of Parliament for Melton, a seat he held until 1895. In 1896, he was summoned to the House of Lords through a writ of acceleration in his father's subsidiary title of Baron Manners of Haddon.

In 1906, he succeeded his father as eighth Duke of Rutland.

He was appointed Honorary Colonel of the 1st Volunteer Battalion, Leicestershire Regiment in 1897, and followed his father as Hon Colonel of the 3rd (Leicestershire Militia) Battalion of the regiment in 1906. He served as Lord Lieutenant of Leicestershire from November 1900 until his death in 1925, and was also President of the North British Academy of Arts at its inauguration and for many years. In 1918 he was made a Knight Companion of the Garter.

== Marriage and issue ==
Rutland married Violet, daughter of Colonel the Hon. Charles Lindsay, on 25 November 1882. They had five children, though their two youngest were likely fathered by other men:

- Lady (Victoria) Marjorie Harriet Manners (1883–1946), married Charles Paget, 6th Marquess of Anglesey and had issue.
- Robert Charles John Manners, Lord Haddon (8 August 1885 – 28 September 1894), died young after surgery for intestinal obstruction
- John Henry Montagu Manners, 9th Duke of Rutland (1886–1940), married Kathleen Tennant and had issue.
- Lady Violet Catherine Manners (1888–1971), rumoured to be fathered by Montagu Corry, 1st Baron Rowton. She married firstly, Hugo Charteris, Lord Elcho, son of Hugo Charteris, 11th Earl of Wemyss and had issue, David Charteris, 12th Earl of Wemyss. She married secondly, Guy Benson.
- Lady Diana Olivia Winifred Maud Manners (1892–1986), fathered by her mother's affair with Harry Cust. She married Duff Cooper, later 1st Viscount Norwich, and had one son.

Rutland died in May 1925, aged 73, and was succeeded in the dukedom by his second and only surviving son, John. The Duchess of Rutland died in December 1937, aged 81.

== Coat of arms ==
Coat of arms of Henry Manners, 8th Duke of Rutland
Coronet A Coronet of a Duke Crest On a Chapeau Gules turned up Ermine a Peacock in its pride proper Escutcheon Or two Bars Azure a Chief quarterly of the last and Gules, in the first and fourth, two Fleur-de-lis, and in the second and third, a Lion passant guardant, all Or Supporters On either side a Unicorn Argent armed, maned, tufted and unguled Or Motto Pour Y Parvenir ("So as to accomplish it") Orders The Garter circlet; motto: Honi soit qui mal y pense (Shame be to him who thinks evil of it).

Parliament of the United Kingdom
Preceded by Lord John Manners	Member of Parliament for Melton; 1888–1895	Succeeded by Lord Edward Manners
Honorary titles
Preceded by The Earl Howe	Lord Lieutenant of Leicestershire; 1900–1925	Succeeded by Sir Arthur Hazlerigg
Party political offices
Preceded by Sir C. E. Howard Vincent	Chairman of the National Union of Conservative and Constitutional Associations; 1896	Succeeded by Arthur Hugh Smith-Barry
Peerage of England
Preceded by John Manners	Duke of Rutland; 1906–1925	Succeeded by John Manners
Preceded by John Manners	Baron Manners (writ in acceleration); 1896–1925	Succeeded by John Manners
