= Loel Guinness =

British politician (1906–1988)

Group Captain Loel Guinness OBE

Member of Parliament for Bath
- In office 1931–1945
- Preceded by: Hon. Charles Baillie-Hamilton
- Succeeded by: Sir James Pitman

Personal details
- Born: 9 June 1906 Manhattan, New York, U.S.
- Died: 31 December 1988 (aged 82) Houston, Texas, U.S.
- Resting place: Cimetière du Bois de Vaux, Lausanne
- Spouses: Hon. Joan Yarde-Buller (m. 1927; div. 1936) Lady Isabel Manners (m. 1936; div. 1951) Gloria Rubio (m. 1951; died 1980)
- Children: 3, including Lindy, Marchioness of Dufferin and Ava
- Parent(s): Benjamin Seymour Guinness; Bridget Williams-Bulkeley

Military service
- Allegiance: United Kingdom
- Branch/service: British Army; Royal Auxiliary Air Force
- Rank: Group Captain
- Commands: No. 601 (County of London) Squadron
- Battles/wars: Second World War
- Awards: Officer of the Order of the British Empire; Mentioned in Despatches (5)

Group Captain Thomas Loel Evelyn Bulkeley Guinness, OBE (9 June 1906 – 31 December 1988) was a British politician, Royal Air Force officer, business magnate and philanthropist. He was Conservative Member of Parliament (MP) for Bath (1931–1945) and achieved fame as a fighter pilot in the Battle of Britain during World War II. Guinness also financed the purchase of the Calypso, leasing her for one symbolic franc a year to famous oceanic explorer Jacques-Yves Cousteau.

== Early life ==
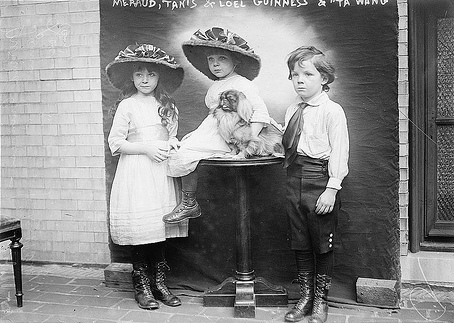
Loel Guinness and his sisters as children

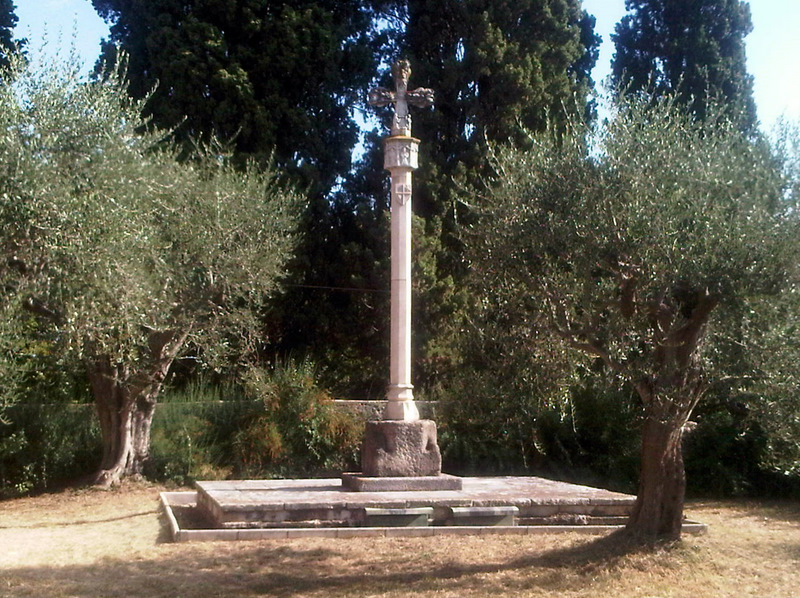
Grave of Bridget Guinness in Mougins, Provence

Born in Manhattan and raised in the United States and England, Loel Guinness was the only son of Benjamin Seymour Guinness (1868–1947) a wealthy New York-based financier (later also a Prince in the Italian nobility) from whom he inherited a fortune. His mother, Bridget Henrietta Frances (née Williams-Bulkeley; 1871-1933), was the sister of Sir Richard Williams-Bulkeley, 12th Baronet, of an old Anglesey landed family. He had two sisters: Meraud Michelle Wemyss Guinness and Tanis Eva Guinness.

He was educated at Royal Military College, Sandhurst, and thereafter gained the rank of lieutenant in the service of the Irish Guards.

== Career ==
After taking flying lessons, Guinness joined the Royal Aero Club in 1928. The following year, he became one of the first private citizens in England to own an airplane and soon he was a member of the County of London's Auxiliary Air Force squadron. He later served as president of Air Work Ltd., an aircraft-parts supplier, and of British United Airways.

In 1931, on his third try, Guinness was elected to Parliament for Bath and was named parliamentary private secretary to Sir Philip Sassoon, the Under Secretary for Air from 1931 to 1935. He held his seat until 1945, when he stood down.

== Second World War ==
Guinness gained the rank of group captain in the service of the Royal Auxiliary Air Force. When the Second World War broke out in 1939, Guinness went on active duty with the Royal Air Force. In 1940 he flew as a fighter pilot in the Battle of Britain, famously buying a petrol station near his aerodrome when his driving was restricted by rationing. In 1944 he became commander of a wing of the Second Tactical Air Force and by the war's end he had been Mentioned in Despatches five times. He was invested as an Officer of the Order of the British Empire in 1942. The Netherlands made him a Commander of the Order of Orange-Nassau and France made him an Officer of the Legion of Honour and awarded him a Croix de Guerre.

== Personal life ==
Guinness's first marriage was to The Hon. Joan Barbara Yarde-Buller (1908–1997), eldest daughter of the 3rd Baron Churston. Before their divorce, they had a son, Patrick Benjamin Guinness, who was killed in an automobile accident near Rarogne, Switzerland.

Joan left him for Prince Aly Khan, the eldest son of the Aga Khan III, the 48th Shia Imam, and Guinness successfully sued Joan and Khan on grounds of adultery. Joan and Khan did not defend the charges and the judge, Mr Justice Bucknill, granted Guinness a decree nisi and full custody of their son and ordered Khan to pay court costs. Joan married Khan on 18 May 1936, a few days after the divorce became absolute.

In 1936, he married his second wife, Lady Isabel Violet Kathleen Manners (1918–2008), daughter of the 9th Duke of Rutland. The Guinnesses were prominent in society at Palm Beach. Together, they were the parents of a son and a daughter, Serena Belinda Rosemary ("Lindy") Guinness, who became the Marchioness of Dufferin upon her marriage to the 5th Marquess of Dufferin.

In a reversal of the outcome of his first marriage, in 1951, Lady Isabel was granted a divorce after accusing him of adultery, which he did not contest.

On 7 April 1951, he married his third wife, the Mexican socialite Gloria Rubio y Alatorre (1913–1980). Her daughter, Dolores married his eldest son.

On 31 December 1988, Guinness died of heart disease at The Methodist Hospital in Houston, Texas, United States. He was buried with the remains of his third wife at the Bois-de-Vaux Cemetery, Lausanne.

Parliament of the United Kingdom
Preceded by Hon. Charles Baillie-Hamilton	Member of Parliament for Bath; 1931–1945	Succeeded by Sir James Pitman
