= Benjamin Seymour Guinness =

Anglo-American businessman

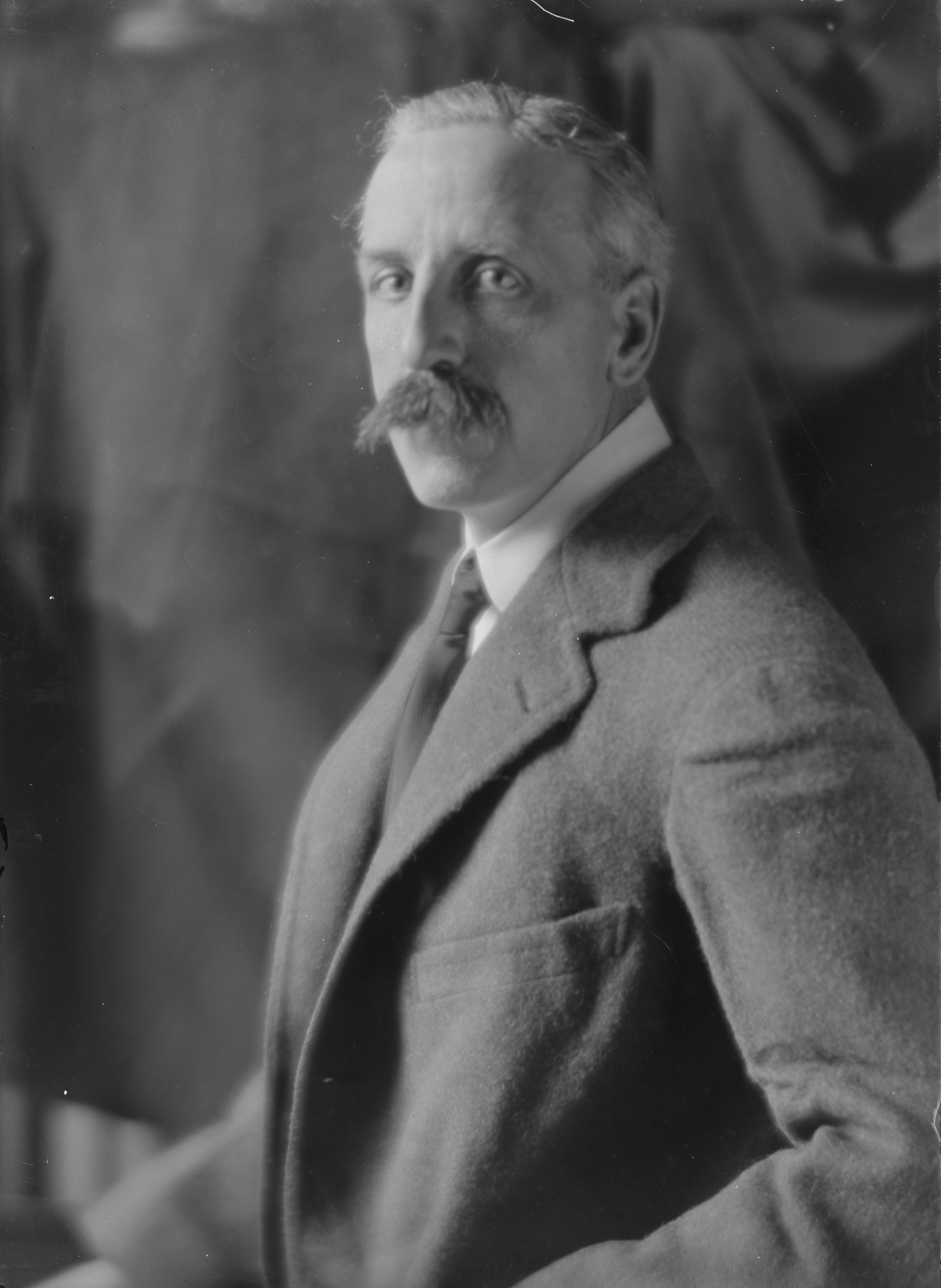
Benjamin Seymour Guinness, by Arnold Genthe

Benjamin Seymour Guinness (18 November 1868 – 15 December 1947) was an Anglo-American businessman, banker and lawyer.

Born in Dublin, Ireland, in 1868, into the "banking line" of the Anglo-Irish Guinness family, Guinness was the fourth son of Richard Seymour Guinness (1826-1915) and a grandson of Robert Rundell Guinness, founder of the Guinness Mahon merchant bank. He was also great-nephew of his namesake, the prominent brewer Sir Benjamin Lee Guinness (from whom stem the Earls of Iveagh).

He was commissioned as an officer in the Royal Navy in 1882. He retired in 1892 with the substantive rank of Lieutenant.

Based in New York, Guinness was a director of the New York Trust Company, Lackawanna Steel Company, Kansas City Southern Railway, Seaboard Air Line Railroad, Duquesne Light Company, and United Railroads of San Francisco. He was also a partner in Ladenburg Thalmann.

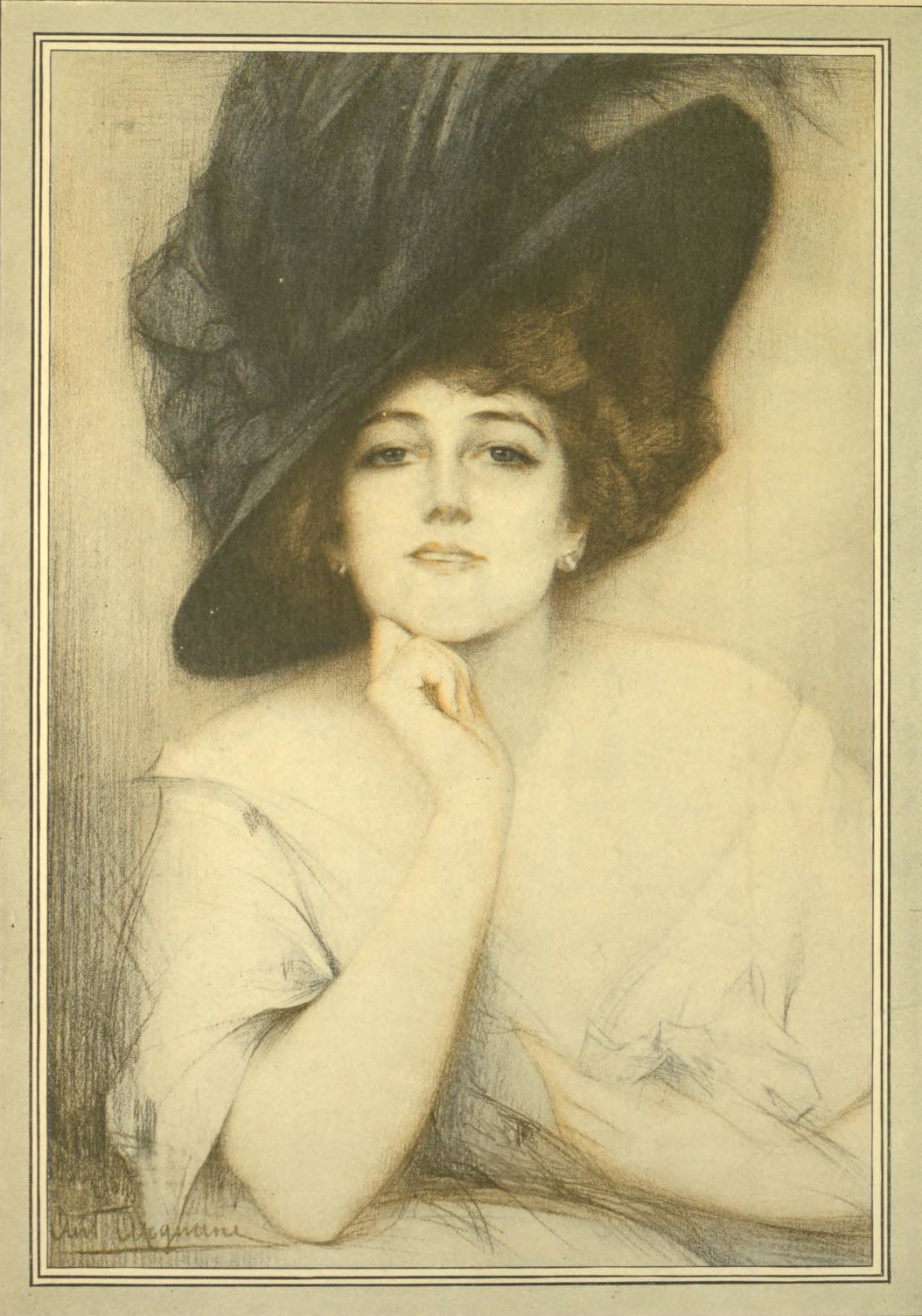
Mrs. Benjamin Guinness of New York, by Antonio Argnani

Guinness married Bridget Williams-Bulkeley (1871-1931), daughter of Sir Richard Williams-Bulkeley, Bt., and was the father of Loel Guinness. In 1936 he remarried to Donna Maria Nunziante di Mignano (1886–1974), daughter and heiress of the Italian Duke of Mignano, of Castello Monte Mignano. His wife was awarded the titular style of Princess by King Umberto II of Italy, decreed on 22 May 1946. The same day, his wife's new title was extended to him and he became a Prince.

Following his death in 1947, his widow and son were involved in a lengthy dispute over his estate.
