= Lady Diana Cooper =

English aristocrat (1892–1986)

The Right Honourable The Viscountess Norwich
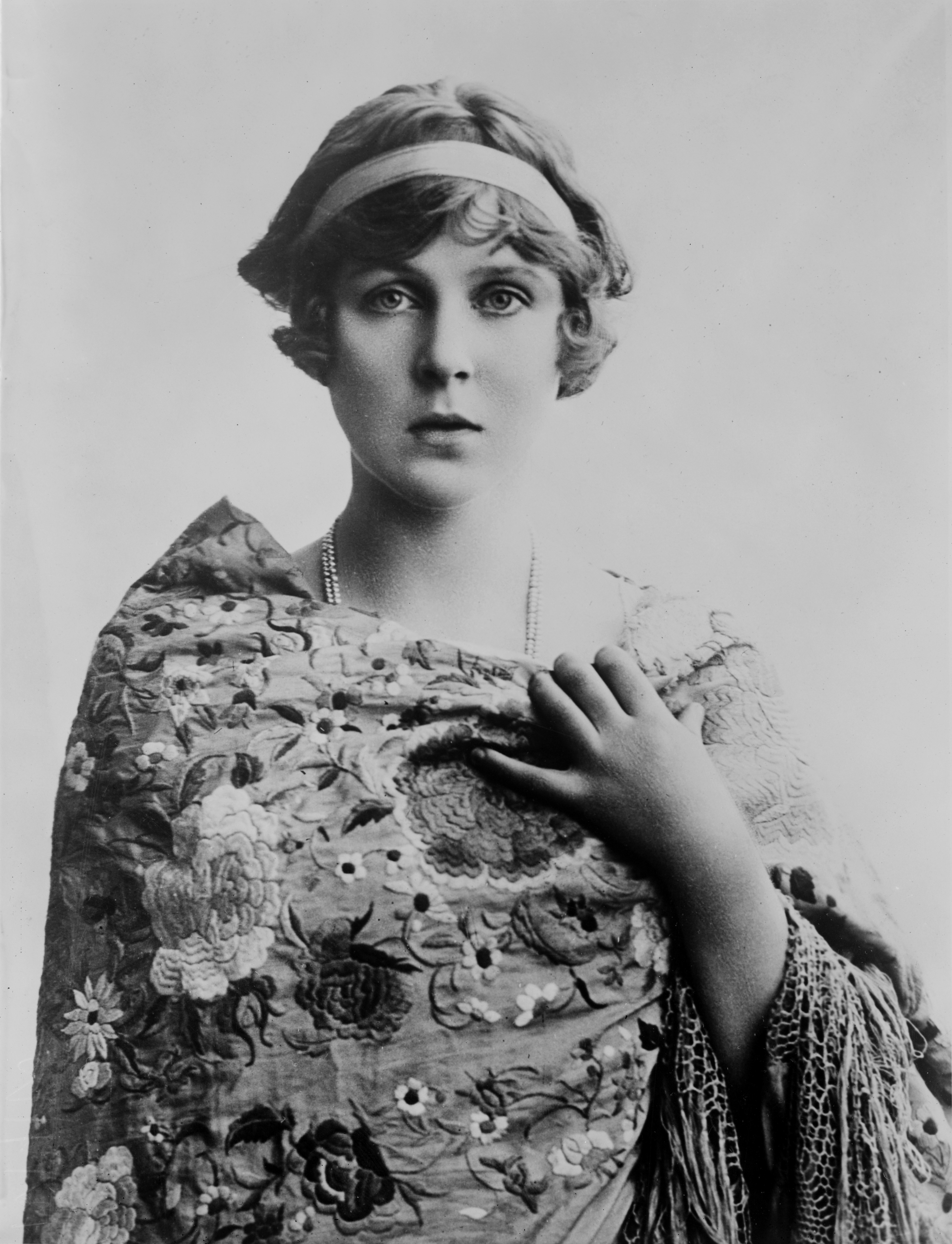
- Born: Lady Diana Olivia Winifred Maud Manners; 29 August 1892; London, England
- Died: 16 June 1986 (aged 93); London, England
- Occupations: Actress, socialite
- Spouse: Alfred Duff Cooper, 1st Viscount Norwich (m. 1919; died 1954)
- Children: John Julius Norwich
- Parents: Violet Lindsay (mother); Henry Cust (biological father); Henry Manners, 8th Duke of Rutland (legal father)

Diana Cooper, Viscountess Norwich (née Lady Diana Olivia Winifred Maud Manners; 29 August 1892 – 16 June 1986) was an English silent film actress and aristocrat who was a well-known social figure in London and Paris.

As a young woman, she moved in a celebrated group of intellectuals known as the Coterie, most of whom were killed in the First World War. She married one of the few survivors, Duff Cooper, later British ambassador to France.

After his death, she wrote three volumes of memoirs which reveal much about early 20th-century upper-class life.

== Birth and youth ==
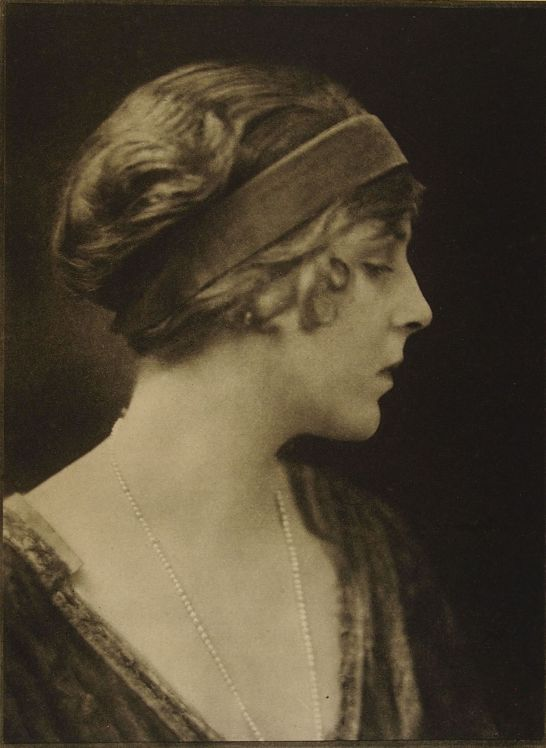
Lady Diana Cooper, from The Book of Fair Women by E. O. Hoppé, 1922

Lady Diana Olivia Winifred Maud Manners was born at 23A Bruton Street in Mayfair, London, on 29 August 1892. Her mother, who was a devotee of the author George Meredith, named her daughter after the titular character in Meredith's novel Diana of the Crossways. Lady Diana was officially the youngest daughter of the 8th Duke of Rutland and his wife, the Duchess of Rutland, but her biological father was the writer Harry Cust. As early as 1908, various pamphlets were being circulated by a former governess claiming that Cust fathered Diana Manners, and Lord Balcarres, a distant cousin of her mother, noted in his diary that the resemblance was said to be striking. Lady Diana herself did not become aware of this until it was casually mentioned to her by Edward Horner at a party after she had come out into society, but "It didn’t seem to matter—I was devoted to my father and I liked Harry Cust too". She later wrote to a friend, "I am cheered very much by Tom Jones on bastards and I like to see myself as a living monument to incontinence".

In her prime, she was regarded as the most beautiful young woman in England, appearing in countless profiles, photographs and articles in newspapers and magazines. She was an active member of the Coterie, an influential group of young English aristocrats and intellectuals of the 1910s whose prominence and numbers dwindled during the First World War. Some view them as prophetic precursors of the Jazz Age.

Lady Diana was the most famous of the group, which included Raymond Asquith (son of H. H. Asquith, the prime minister), Patrick Shaw-Stewart, Edward Horner, Sir Denis Anson, Billy and Julian Grenfell, and Duff Cooper. Diana nurtured a love for the married Asquith, and she became close friends with both him and his wife, Katherine.

His death in the First World War devastated her and was compounded by the loss of other men in her circle: Horner, Charles Lister, Julian and Billy Grenfell and Shaw-Stewart in the war; Anson by drowning. Lady Diana married Cooper, one of her circle of friends' last surviving male members, in June 1919. It was not a popular choice with Diana's parents, who took a dim view of his lack of title and wealth and his drinking, gambling and womanising. They had hopes for a marriage to the Prince of Wales. As for Cooper, he once impulsively wrote a letter to Lady Diana before their marriage that declared, "I hope everyone you like better than me will die very soon".

In 1929, she gave birth to her only child, John Julius Cooper, later the 2nd Viscount Norwich and known as John Julius Norwich, who became a writer and broadcaster.

== Career on stage and in silent films ==
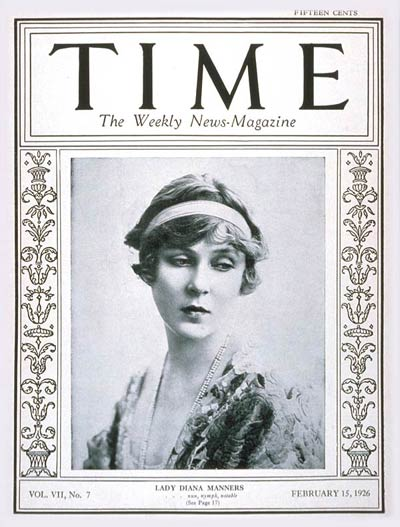
Lady Diana Cooper, Time magazine (15 February 1926)

She worked as a Voluntary Aid Detachment (VAD) nursing assistant at Guy's Hospital during the war and later at a hospital for officers her mother set up in London (though she annoyed her co-workers with her inconsistent attendance and tendency to take off with friends). She also worked briefly as editor of the magazine Femina, and she wrote a column in the Beaverbrook newspapers before turning to acting. Her work as a VAD increased her popularity and public notoriety. Her name appears in the wartime version of the music hall song "Burlington Bertie": "I'll eat a banana/with Lady Diana/Aristocracy working at Guy's".

In 1918, Lady Diana took uncredited film roles; in The Great Love she played herself in her capacity of a celebrity. She also appeared in a propaganda film for the war effort, Hearts of the World, directed by D.W. Griffith, who chose her because he thought her "the most beloved woman in England". A few years later she starred in two of the first British colour films: The Glorious Adventure (1922) and The Virgin Queen (1923); in the latter she played Queen Elizabeth I. Then she turned to the stage, playing the Madonna in the 1924 revival of The Miracle (directed by Max Reinhardt). The play achieved outstanding international success, and she toured on and off for twelve years with the cast.

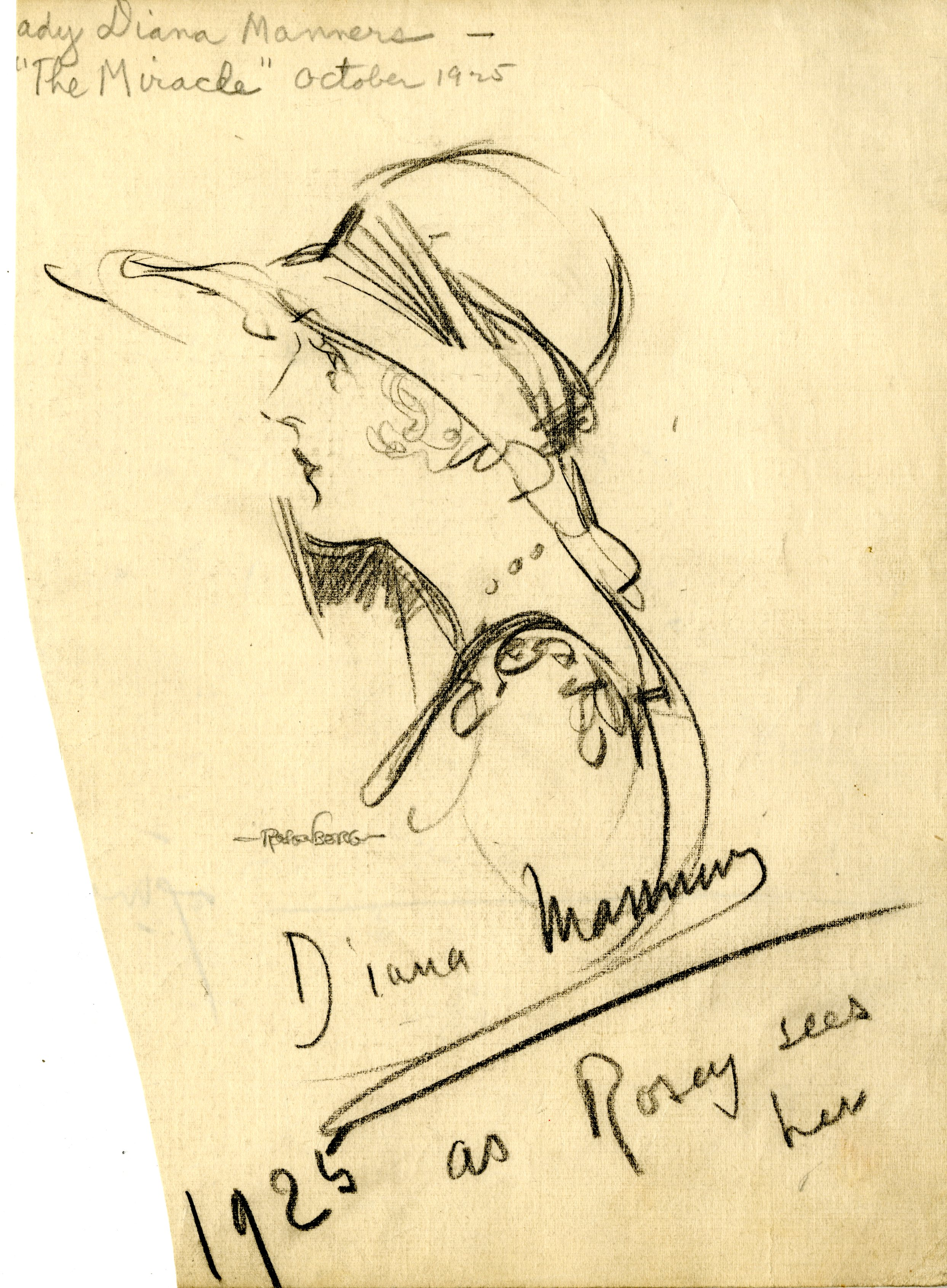
Diana Manners autographed drawing by Manuel Rosenberg for the Cincinnati Post, 1925

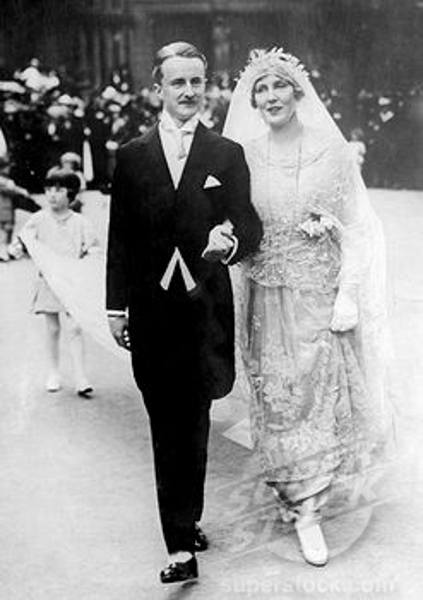
Duff Cooper and Lady Diana Manners married in 1919.

== Social figure and wife of ambassador ==
In 1924, she lent her fame to her husband's successful campaign for election to House of Commons and canvassed on his behalf in Oldham. The Coopers were friends with Edward VIII and guests of his on a 1936 yacht cruise of the Adriatic, which famously caused his affair with Wallis Simpson to become publicly known for the first time.

She supported her husband in his political posts and even travelled with him to the Far East in late 1941 prior to the Japanese attack on British Malaya. As Prime Minister Churchill's personal representative, Duff Cooper MP was unsuccessful in effecting a positive strategy, and he was recalled in January 1942, shortly before Singapore fell in February. In between accompanying her husband on his wartime appointments abroad, Lady Diana converted her three-acre property at Bognor Regis into a smallholding to provide her family with extra food in light of shortages and rationing. Aided by her friend Conrad Russell, she raised livestock, grew crops, practised beekeeping, and made her own butter and cheeses. She also volunteered at a YMCA canteen and worked briefly in a workshop making camouflage nets for gunners.

Between January and August 1944, the couple lived in Algiers, where Duff Cooper was appointed British Representative to the Free French Committee of National Liberation. Lady Diana focused her energies as a hostess on making an "Eden" of the couple's home for British civil servants stationed in Algiers, who were poorly housed in unheated and waterless lodgings and "had no retreats, amenities, sports or welcomes". The Coopers' home provided British personnel an outlet for rest, socializing, good food, and recreation. Her reputation became even more celebrated in France as the centrepoint of immediate post-Second World War French literary culture when Cooper served from 1944 to 1948 as Britain's ambassador to France. During this period, Lady Diana's popularity as a hostess remained undimmed, even after allegations that the embassy guest list included "pederasts and collaborators". The couple were known for maintaining an "open house" every evening, where leading cultural figures and diplomats could come freely to socialize and enjoy good food and plentiful liquour provided by the British government, both luxuries in Paris after years of wartime shortages.

Following Duff Cooper's retirement in 1947, the couple continued to live in France at Chantilly until his death in 1954, following an alcohol-related upper gastrointestinal haemorrhage. The couple's decision to remain in France was controversial because it was contrary to diplomatic protocol; their continuing popularity as social figures and hosts in Paris effectively made their home a rival British Embassy. She was a prominent guest at Le Bal Oriental hosted by Carlos de Beistegui at the Palazzo Labia in Venice in 1951, known as the "Ball of the Century". Lady Diana dressed as Cleopatra and greeted her fellow guests, some 1,000 people, in a vestibule pageant. Duff Cooper was created Viscount Norwich in 1952, for services to the nation, but Lady Diana refused to be called Viscountess Norwich, claiming that it sounded like "porridge". Following her husband's death, she made an announcement in The Times to this effect, stating that she had "reverted to the name and title of Lady Diana Cooper".

== Later years ==
Lady Diana sharply reduced her activities in the late 1950s but produced three volumes of memoirs: The Rainbow Comes and Goes, The Light of Common Day and Trumpets from the Steep. The three volumes are included in a compilation, Autobiography (ISBN 9780881841312). She died at her home in Little Venice, in West London, in 1986 at the age of 93, after many years of increasing infirmity. Her body was interred within the Manners family mausoleum at Belvoir Castle.

== Books about or influenced by Lady Diana ==
Philip Ziegler wrote Diana Cooper: A Biography (ISBN 0-241-10659-1) in 1981; it was published by Hamish Hamilton. Several writers used her as inspiration for their novels, including Evelyn Waugh, who fictionalised her as Mrs. Stitch in the Sword of Honour trilogy and elsewhere, and Nancy Mitford, who portrayed her as the narcissistic, self-dramatizing Lady Leone in Don't Tell Alfred. In F. Scott Fitzgerald's short story "The Jelly-Bean", the character Nancy Lamar states that she wants to be like Lady Diana Manners. Enid Bagnold published The Loved and Envied (ISBN 0-86068-978-6) in 1951. The novel, based on Lady Diana and her group of friends, dealt with the effects of ageing on a beautiful woman. Oliver Anderson dedicated Random Rendezvous, published in 1955, to "Diana Cooper and Jenny Day".

Diana Cooper Autobiography: The Rainbow Comes and Goes (1958), The Light of Common Day (1959), Trumpets from the Steep, (1960) (ISBN 0-88184-131-5) was published as a trilogy by Carroll & Graf Publishers Inc. New York in 1985. It had a second printing in 1988 and was republished by Faber & Faber in the 'Faber Finds' series, 2011.

In 2013, her son, John Julius Norwich, edited a volume of her letters to him as a youth, Darling Monster: The Letters of Lady Diana Cooper to Her Son John Julius Norwich. Published by Chatto & Windus, ISBN 978-0701187798. Rachel Cooke in The Guardian wrote, "Cooper's letters have a special immediacy and frankness ... they are conspiratorial".

== Arms ==
Coat of arms of Lady Diana Cooper
Escutcheon The arms of Duff Cooper, 1st Viscount Norwich (Or three Lions rampant Gules on a Chief Azure a Portcullis chained between two Fleurs-de-lis of the first.) impaled with the arms of Henry Manners, 8th Duke of Rutland (Or, two bars azure a chief quarterly azure and gules; in the 1st and 4th quarters two fleurs-de-lis and in the 2nd and 3rd a lion passant guardant or.) Supporters On either side a Unicorn Argent gorged with a Collar with Chain reflexed over the back Or pendent from the collar of the dexter a Portcullis chained and from that of the sinister a Fleur-de-lys both Gold.

== Selected filmography ==
- The Great Love (1918) (*as herself)
- The Glorious Adventure (1922)
- The Virgin Queen (1923)

== See also ==
- List of covers of Time magazine (1920s) – 15 February 1926
- Bob cut
