= John Gwynne (MP for Bath) =

16th-century English politician

John Gwynne (fl. 1563) was an English politician.

He was a member (MP) of the parliament of England for Bath in 1563.

Parliament of England
Preceded by Edward St Loe; William Robinson	Member of Parliament for Bath; 1563; With: Thomas Turner	Succeeded by Edward Baber; George Pearman
