= Thomas Turner (died c. 1586) =

English politician

Thomas Turner (died c. 1586), of Bath, Somerset, was an English politician.

He was a Member of the Parliament of England (MP) for Bath in 1563. He was Mayor of Bath in 1575–76.

Parliament of England
Preceded by Edward St Loe; William Robinson	Member of Parliament for Bath; 1563; With: Edward Baber; John Gwynne	Succeeded by Edward Baber; George Pearman
