= William Price (MP for Bath) =

16th-century English politician

William Price (died 1596), of Bath, Somerset, was an English politician.

He was a member (MP) of the parliament of England for Bath in 1593.

Parliament of England
Preceded by John Court; John Walley	Member of Parliament for Bath; 1593; With: William Shareston	Succeeded by William Shareston; William Heath
