= List of mayors of Bath =

Mayor of Bath
- Coat of arms of Bath
- Incumbent; Ruth Malloy since 6 June 2026
- Style: The Right Worshipful the Mayor of Bath
- Member of: Charter Trustees of the City of Bath
- Appointer: Charter Trustees of the City of Bath
- Term length: One municipal year
- Formation: 1189
- Deputy: Onkar Saini
- Website: Official website

The Mayor of Bath is a ceremonial post held by a member of the charter trustees of Bath, elected annually by the trustees of the city.

In 1189, Richard I of England granted a charter to the city of Bath establishing a mayor, with the first recorded mayor being John de Porta in 1230. In 1590, a Royal Charter of Incorporation was issued confirming the city's status of a corporate body of mayor, alderman and citizens. The Municipal Corporations Act 1835, reformed the old closed corporation and made it a modern elected body. In 1888, Bath became a county borough. When local government was restructured through the Local Government Act 1972, Bath was restructured as a district council within the County of Avon. Until further local government re-organisation in 1996, the role of mayor was held by the chairman of Bath City Council; since the creation of Bath and North East Somerset Council, the role has been held by the chairman of the Charter Trustees of the City of Bath.

The mayor for the municipal year beginning 6 June 2026 is Ruth Malloy.

== 13th century ==
- 1230: John de Porta
- 1237: Henry le Tayleur
- 1249: Walter Falc / Sir Henry Tailor (Cissor)
- 1262: Henry the Tailor
- 1277: Henry Tailor
- 1279: Nicholas Biscop
- 1280: John de Cumbe / William Scleht / Henry Tailor (Cissor)
- 1283: Richard Tabernarius / Richard Everard
- 1284: Thomas Sweyn
- 1285: William Cook (Cocus) / Roger de Dichegate / Nicholas Clerk (Clerico) / Stephen de Devyses / John de Cumbe / Richard Everard / Gilbert Taylor
- 1286: Gilbert Cissor
- 1290: Stephen Baker / Henry Tailor (Cissor)
- 1291: Stephen de Devyses
- 1293: John le Taylor / William Scuel / William Cook (Cocus) / Peter le Brevitor
- 1295: Peter le Brevitor
- 1296: Thomas Sweyn
- 1299: William Cook (Cocus)
- 1300: William Cook / John le Veniur / John Cole

== 14th century ==
- 1302: Peter le Brevitor / William Scuel
- 1304: William Cook
- 1307: Peter le Brevitor
- 1310: William Cook
- 1311: Walter Falconer
- 1313: Peter le Brevitor
- 1314: Richard Wytesone
- 1316: John Baker (Pistor)
- 1317: John Baker (Pistor)
- 1318: Richard Wytesone
- 1322: John Baker (Pistor)
- 1323: John Cole
- 1325: John de Wyk
- 1328: John de Wyk
- 1329: Adam Wytesone
- 1330: William Cook
- 1331: Alexander Dye (Tinctor)
- 1332: Roger Cole
- 1333: William Sweyn
- 1334: Alexander Dyer (Tinctor)
- 1335: Adam Wytesone
- 1336: Roger Cole
- 1337: Alexander Dyer
- 1338: Roger Crist
- 1339: William Cubbel
- 1340: Adam Wytesone
- 1341: Alexander Dyer
- 1342: Roger Crist
- 1343: John Cole
- 1344: William Cubbel
- 1345: Adam Wytesone
- 1346: Alexander Dyer
- 1347: William Cubbel
- 1348: William Cubbel
- 1349: Roger Crist
- 1350: Thomas Stote
- 1351: Roger le Dyer
- 1352: William Cubbel
- 1353: Thomas Stote
- 1354: Walter Carpenter
- 1355: John Whittokesmede
- 1356: William Serrel
- 1357: William Cook
- 1358: John Sheory
- 1359: Robert le Dyer
- 1360: John Whittokesmede
- 1361: Walter Carpenter
- 1362: John Gregory
- 1363: John Gregory
- 1364: John Whittokesmede
- 1365: John Whittokesmede
- 1366: John Gregory
- 1367: John Gregory
- 1369: John Whittokesmede
- 1370: William Drayton
- 1371: John Gregory
- 1372: Robert Wattes
- 1373: John Gregory
- 1375: John Compe
- 1376: John Gregory
- 1377: John Compe
- 1378: John Natton
- 1379: Robert Wattes
- 1380: John Natton
- 1381: John Gregory
- 1382: Richard Bedul
- 1385: John Natton
- 1388: Robert Waspray
- 1390: Robert Draper
- 1391: William Rous
- 1392: Robert Waspray
- 1393: William Rous
- 1394: Robert Waspray
- 1395: John Waspray
- 1396: Thomas Swayne
- 1398: Thomas Plomes
- 1399: Robert Waspray
- 1400: Roger Testwode

== 15th century ==
- 1401: Roger Testwode
- 1402: Roger Wasprey
- 1403: Roger Testwode
- 1404: Richard Widcombe
- 1407: Roger Testwode
- 1408: Ralph Hunt
- 1409: John Savage
- 1410: Ralph Hunt
- 1411: Robert Waspray
- 1412: John Savage
- 1414: Ralph Hunt
- 1416: Walter Rich
- 1417: Ralph Hunt
- 1418: Richard Widcombe
- 1420: Richard Widcombe
- 1422: Ralph Hunt
- 1423: William Philipps
- 1425: John Savage
- 1426: William Hodgekyns
- 1427: Richard Widcombe
- 1428: William Philipps
- 1429: Ralph Hunt
- 1433: William Philipps
- 1434: William Philipps
- 1435: William Hodgekyns
- 1437: William Philipps
- 1438: Walter Rich
- 1441: William Hodgekyns
- 1442: William Philipps
- 1443: Walter Rich
- 1444: William Philipps
- 1447: William Hodgekyns
- 1449: William Cubbel
- 1452: William Dreyton
- 1454: Thomas Abell
- 1455: John Austell
- 1461: John Thomas
- 1467: John Steere
- 1468: William Stanburgh
- 1471: William Hayne
- 1473: William Stanburgh
- 1474: Robert Rogers
- 1475: Robert Batyn
- 1476: William Stanburgh
- 1477: Robert Rogers
- 1488: William Tyler
- 1492: Robert Batyn
- 1497: Lawrence Leche

== 16th century ==
- 1503: Richard Chapman
- 1530: Thomas Welpley
- 1533: Henry Covell
- 1534: William Horsington
- 1540: Robert Style
- 1543: John Chapman
- 1544: Anthony Scrope
- 1550: John Clement
- 1551: Edward Ludwell
- 1553: John Davys
- 1554: Richard Chapman
- 1555: Thomas Ash
- 1567: John Pearman
- 1568: Robert Frauncys
- 1569: Robert Fraunces
- 1572: John Wyatt
- 1573: William Walley
- 1574: William Cavell
- 1575: Thomas Turner
- 1576: George Pearman
- 1577: George Pearman
- 1578: John Wyatt
- 1579: Thomas Bushe
- 1580: William Shareston
- 1581: William Walley
- 1582: George Pearman
- 1583: John Chapman
- 1584: William Shareston
- 1585: John Walley, Snr
- 1586: Thomas Fytche
- 1587: John Sachefild
- 1588: John Walley, Jnr
- 1589: William Shareston
- 1591: Thomas Fytche
- 1592: John Sachefild
- 1593: William Chapman
- 1594: William Heath
- 1595: William Moreford
- 1596: John Sachfilde
- 1597: Thomas Fytche (died in office)
- 1597: William Heath (elected)
- 1598: William Shareston
- 1599: John Chapman
- 1600: John Sachfeilde

== 17th century ==
- 1601: Thomas Power
- 1602: William Heath
- 1603: William Shareston
- 1604: Christopher Stone
- 1605: Walter Chapman
- 1606: John Parker
- 1607: Thomas Wyatt
- 1608: William Clifte
- 1609: John Sherston
- 1610: John Sachfeild
- 1611: Christopher Stone
- 1612: John Wood
- 1613: Richard Gay
- 1614: John Cutt
- 1615: William Shareston
- 1616: William Chapman
- 1617: Walter Chapman
- 1618: William Clift
- 1619: Richard Gay
- 1620: Walter Chapman
- 1621: Thomas Moorford
- 1622: Robert Fry
- 1623: William Chapman
- 1624: Matthewe Rendoll
- 1625: Richard Gay
- 1626: George Chapman
- 1627: Richard Chapman
- 1628: Robert Fisher
- 1629: Matthew Clift
- 1630: William Chapman
- 1631: Richard Gay
- 1632: Arthur Sherstone
- 1633: Arthur Kingston
- 1634: Matthewe Rendoll
- 1635: George Chapman
- 1636: John Bigg
- 1637: Richard Chapman
- 1638: Robert Ffisher
- 1639: William Chapman
- 1640: Matthew Clift
- 1641: William Chapman
- 1642: Thomas Burford
- 1643: John Parker
- 1644: Richard Chapman
- 1645: John Bigg
- 1646: John Atwood
- 1647: Walter Chapman
- 1648: Richard Druce
- 1649: Matthew Clift
- 1650: John Pearce
- 1651: John Bigge
- 1652: John Atwood
- 1653: John Parker
- 1654: Walter Chapman (died in office 1655)
- 1655: John Bigges (elected 30 April 1655)
- 1655: John Boys
- 1656: Matthew Clift
- 1657: John Masters
- 1658: John Pearce
- 1659: John Biggs
- 1660: John Fford
- 1661: John Parker
- 1662: Robert Child
- 1663: Henry Chapman
- 1664: Walter Gibbes
- 1665: John Pearce
- 1666: John Chapman
- 1667: Thomas Gibbs
- 1668: Robert Chapman
- 1669: William Childe
- 1670: Edward White
- 1671: John Masters
- 1672: Henry Chapman
- 1673: Henry Parker
- 1674: John Reed
- 1675: John Bush
- 1676: Walter Gibbs
- 1677: Benjamin Baber
- 1678: Robert Chapman
- 1679: John Masters
- 1680: William Bush
- 1681: Edward Bushell
- 1682: Robert Hayward
- 1683: Walter Hicks
- 1684: John Bush
- 1685: John Stibbs
- 1686: John Pocock
- 1687: Benjamin Baber
- 1688: Walter Gibbs
- 1689: Robert Chapman
- 1690: John Masters
- 1691: George Colloby
- 1692: William Bush
- 1693: Edward Bushell
- 1694: Robert Hayward
- 1695: Walter Hickes
- 1696: John Axford
- 1697: John Bush
- 1698: John Stibs
- 1699: Thomas Gibbs
- 1700: Benjamin Baber

== 18th century ==
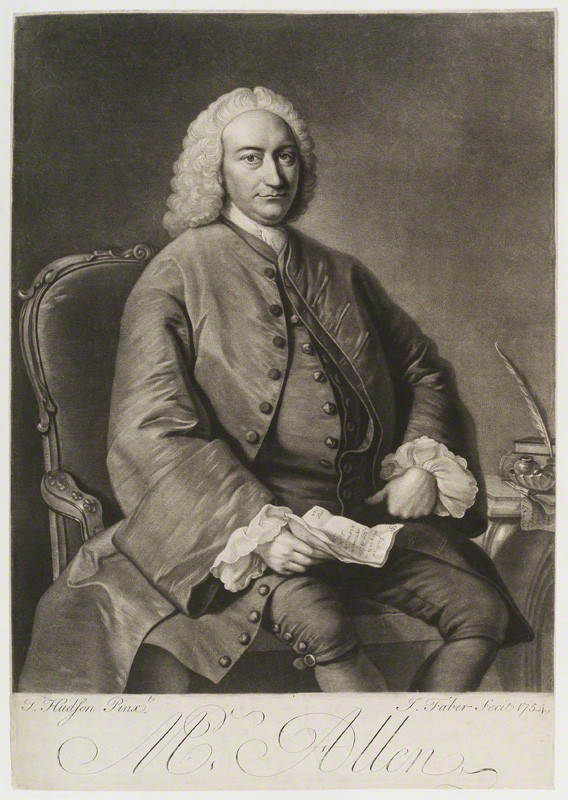
Ralph Allen, Mayor of Bath 1742

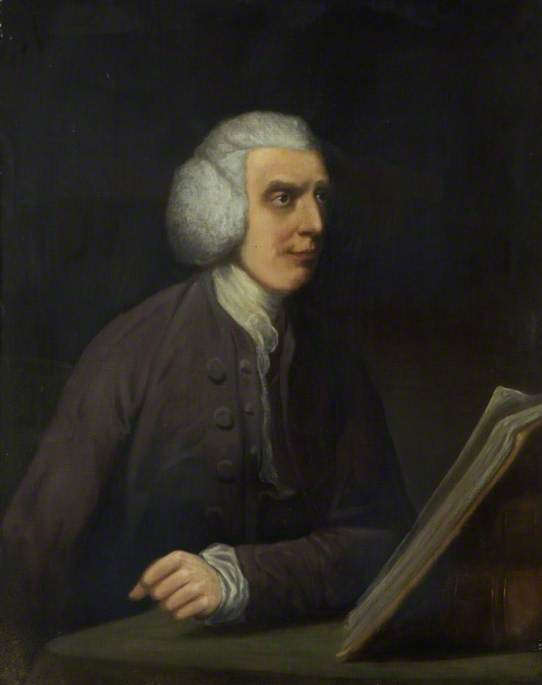
Henry Harington, Mayor of Bath 1793

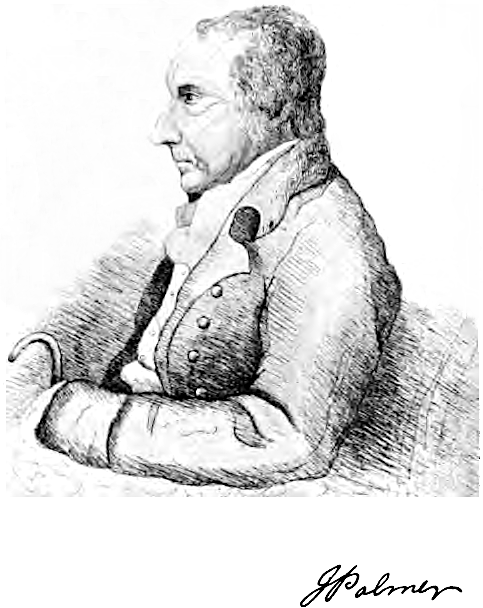
John Palmer, Mayor of Bath 1796 & 1809

- 1701: Richard Masters
- 1702: William Chapman
- 1703: John Bush
- 1704: William Bush
- 1705: Walter Hicks
- 1706: Edward Woolmer
- 1707: John Stibbs
- 1708: Edward Bushell
- 1709: Charles Child
- 1710: Walter Gibbes
- 1711: Thomas Gibbes
- 1712: Richard Morgan
- 1713: Richard Ford
- 1714: Thomas Bigges
- 1715: William Long
- 1716: John Saunder
- 1717: Richard Masters
- 1718: Thomas Bushell
- 1719: William Collibee
- 1720: Edward Woolmer
- 1721: George Tryme
- 1722: William Bush
- 1723: John Hicks
- 1724: Thomas Atwood
- 1725: Rosewell Gibbs
- 1726: Walter Chapman
- 1727: William Chapman
- 1728: John Billing
- 1729: Francis Bave
- 1730: Richard Ford
- 1731: William Horton
- 1732: Milo Smith
- 1733: Richard Morgan
- 1734: Thomas Short
- 1735: Thomas Atwood
- 1736: Richard Matravers
- 1737: James Atwood
- 1738: John Saunders
- 1739: William Bush
- 1740: Charles Stone
- 1741: Henry Atwood
- 1742: Ralph Allen
- 1743: Ambrose Bishop
- 1744: John Chapman
- 1745: John Cogswell
- 1746: Thomas Atwood
- 1747: Thursby Robinson
- 1748: James Atwood
- 1749: Charles Stone
- 1750: Henry Atwood
- 1751: Francis Hales
- 1752: Thomas Atwood, Snr
- 1753: Thomas Atwood, Jnr
- 1754: John Chapman
- 1755: Samuel Bush
- 1756: Edward B Collibee
- 1757: William Chapman
- 1758: Henry Atwood
- 1759: Francis Hales
- 1760: Thomas Attwood
- 1761: John Chapman
- 1762: Francis Hales
- 1763: Samuel Bush
- 1764: John Horton
- 1765: Edward B Collibee
- 1766: Henry Wright
- 1767: William Chapman
- 1768: Charles Biggs
- 1769: Thomas Warr Attwood
- 1770: John Chapman
- 1771: John Horton
- 1772: Walter Wiltshire
- 1773: Francis Bennet
- 1774: Philip Ditcher
- 1775: Edward B Collibee
- 1776: Henry Wright
- 1777: John Chapman
- 1778: Simon Crook
- 1779: John Chapman
- 1780: Walter Wiltshire
- 1781: Francis Bennet
- 1782: Leonard Coward
- 1783: James Leake
- 1784: William Street (died in office 26 May 1785) (brother of Ann Street Barry)
- 1785: Edward B Collibee
- 1786: William Anderdon
- 1787: Leonard Coward
- 1788: Jacob Smith
- 1789: Leonard Coward
- 1790: John Horton
- 1791: Walter Wiltshire
- 1792: Abel Moysey
- 1793: Henry Harington
- 1794: William Anderdon
- 1795: John Symons
- 1796: John Palmer
- 1797: Charles Phillott
- 1798: George Chapman
- 1799: John Horton
- 1800: Harry Atwood

== 19th century ==
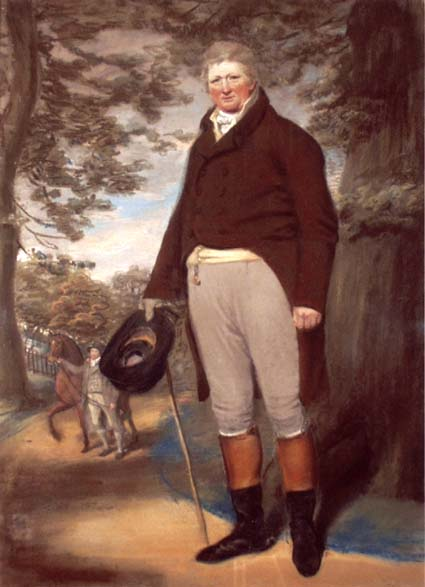
Eleazer Pickwick, Mayor of Bath 1826

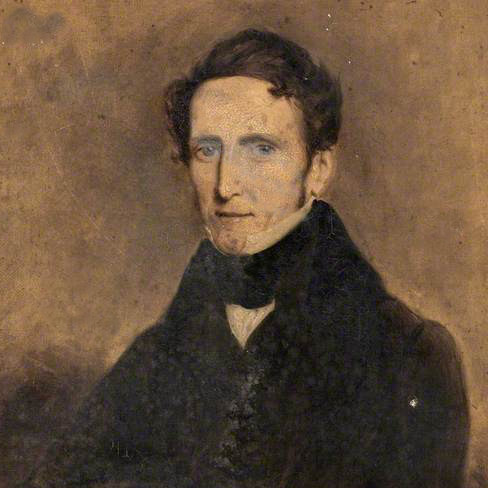
William Thomas Blair, the first Mayor of Bath elected under a new Municipal Corporations Act in 1835

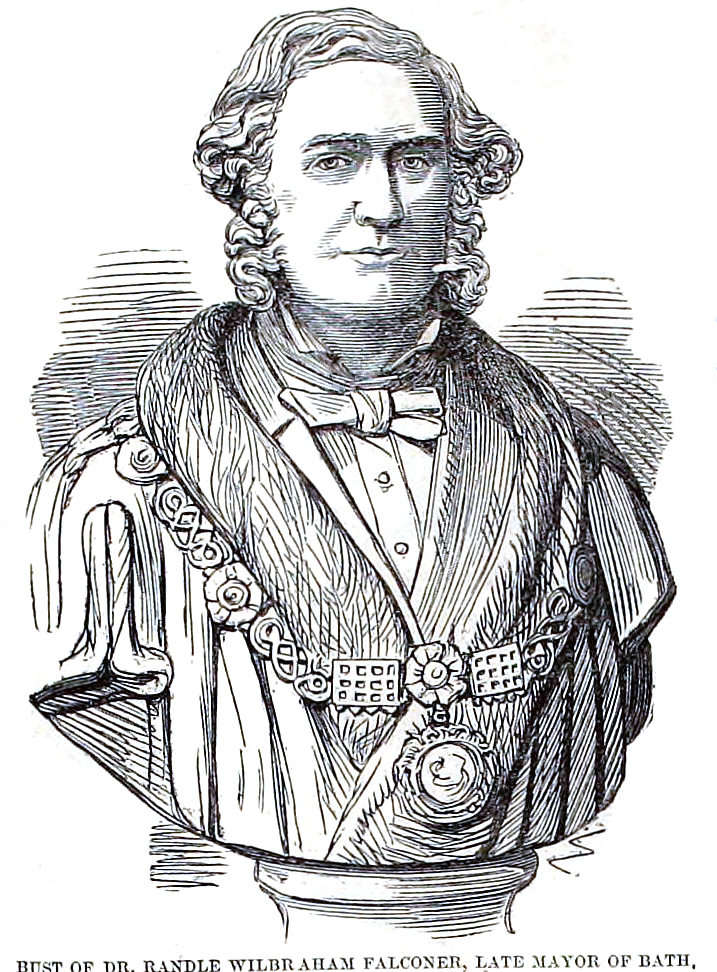
Randle Wilbraham Falconer, Mayor of Bath 1857 & 1858

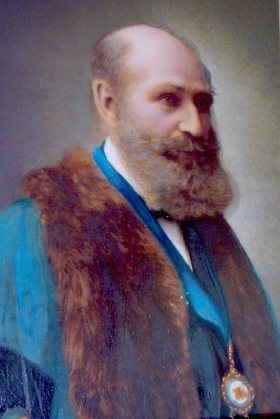
Handel Cossham, Mayor of Bath 1882 & 1884

- 1801: Sir William Watson
- 1802: Henry Parry
- 1803: John Symons
- 1804: William Anderdon
- 1805: Charles Phillott
- 1806: John Horton
- 1807: Harry Atwood
- 1808: Henry Parry
- 1809: John Palmer
- 1810: Abel Moysey
- 1811: Joseph Phillott
- 1812: Charles Crook
- 1813: William Anderdon
- 1814: Charles Phillott
- 1815: Morgan Nicols
- 1816: Edmund Anderdon
- 1817: George Tugwell
- 1818: John Kitson
- 1819: George Edward Allen
- 1820: John Wiltshire
- 1821: William Clark
- 1822: Charles Crook
- 1823: Charles Phillott
- 1824: Edmund Anderdon
- 1825: George Edward Allen
- 1826: Eleazer Pickwick
- 1827: George H Tugwell
- 1828: William Tudor
- 1829: Joseph Hume Spry
- 1830: John Ford Davis
- 1831: George Kitson
- 1832: William Clark
- 1833: Johnson Phillott
- 1834: George Norman
- 1835: William Thomas Blair
- 1836: William Thomas Blair (until 9 November 1837)
- 1837: Simon Barrow
- 1838: Henry Gordon
- 1839: Richard Shuttleworth Cruttwell
- 1840: William Hunt
- 1841: George Norman
- 1842: George Edridge
- 1843: George Moger
- 1844: Henry Gordon
- 1845: Samuel Batchellor
- 1846: Augustus George Barrette
- 1847: William Hunt
- 1848: William Sutcliffe
- 1849: Frederick Dowding
- 1850: Frederick Dowding
- 1851: William Long
- 1852: Francis Allen
- 1853: Thomas Gill
- 1854: William Hunt
- 1855: William Bush
- 1856: Robert Cook
- 1857: Randle Wilbraham Falconer
- 1858: Randle Wilbraham Falconer
- 1859: Thomas Barrett
- 1860: Thomas Jolly
- 1861: Thomas Fuller
- 1862: Thomas Barter
- 1863: Jerom Murch
- 1864: Jerom Murch
- 1865: George Moger
- 1866: William Thompson
- 1867: Edward Francis Slack (died in office 29 November 1867)
- 1867: William Hunt (elected 5 December 1867)
- 1868: Thomas Jolly
- 1869: Thomas Washbourne Gibbs
- 1870: John Hulbert
- 1871: John Hulbert
- 1872: Robert Stickney Blaine
- 1873: William Hunt
- 1874: James Aylmer Paynter
- 1875: James Aylmer Paynter
- 1876: Jerom Murch
- 1877: Jerom Murch
- 1878: James Chaffin
- 1879: James Chaffin
- 1880: James Chaffin
- 1881: John Stothert Bartrum
- 1882: Handel Cossham
- 1883: Thomas Wilton
- 1884: Handel Cossham
- 1885: Anthony Hammond
- 1886: Jerom Murch
- 1887: Anthony Hammond
- 1888: Herny William Freeman
- 1889: John Stothert Bartrum
- 1890: Jerom Murch
- 1891: John Sylvanus Turner
- 1892: Jerom Murch
- 1893: Reginald Quintin Mainwaring
- 1894: William Crucknell Jolly
- 1895: John Rubie
- 1896: George Woodiwiss
- 1897: Charles Henry Simpson, Major
- 1898: John Ricketts (died in office 13 July 1899)
- 1899: George Woodiwiss (elected 1 August 1899)
- 1899: Robert Edmund Dickinson
- 1900: Thomas Ball Silcock

== 20th century ==
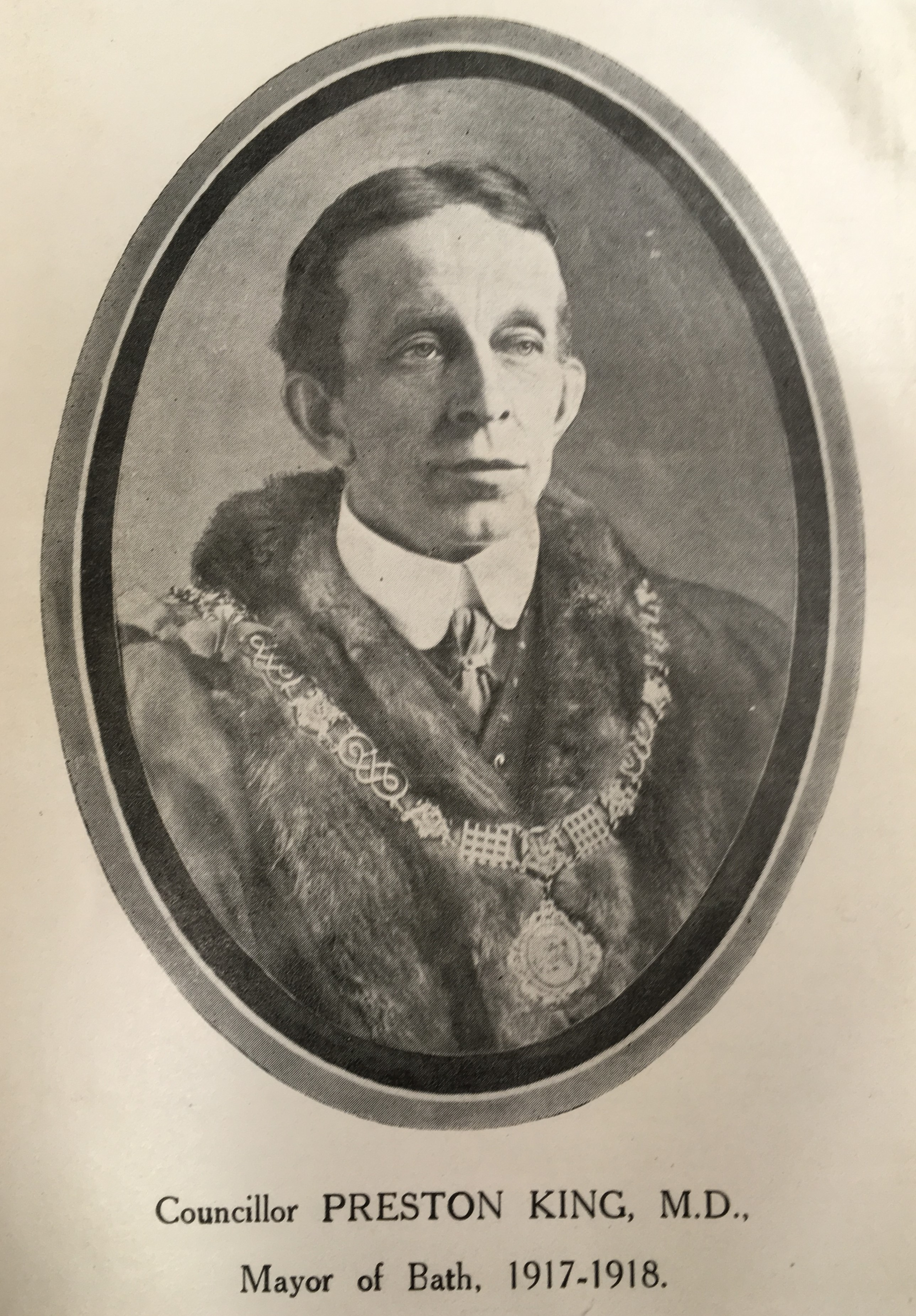
Preston King, Mayor of Bath 1913 & 1917

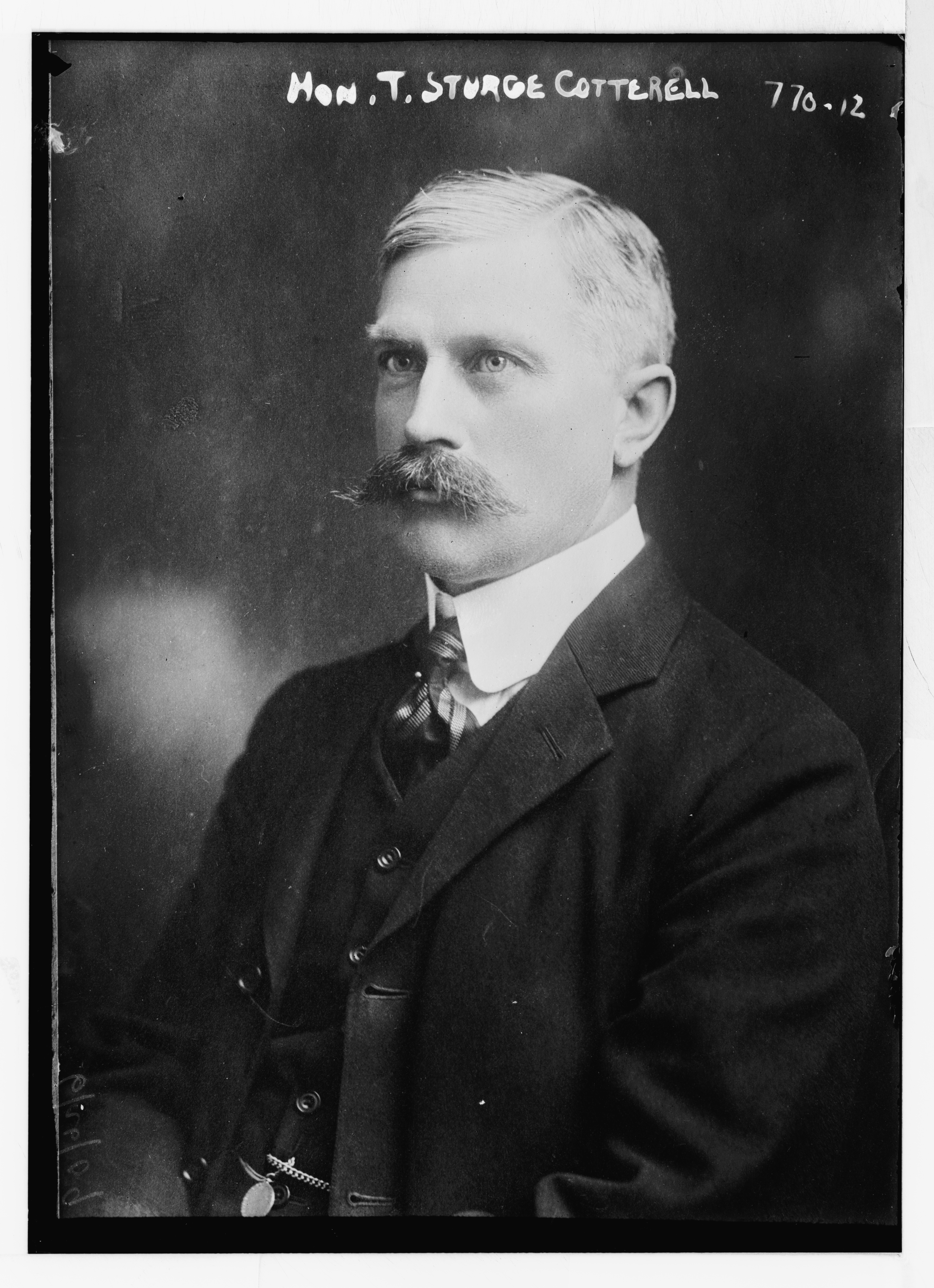
Thomas Sturge Cotterell, Mayor of Bath 1930

- 1901: Edward England Phillips
- 1902: James Edward Henshaw
- 1903: Charles Henry Simpson, Major
- 1904: Benjamin John
- 1905: Charles Bryan Oliver
- 1906: Sydney William Bush
- 1907: Thomas Hodgson Miller
- 1908: John William Knight
- 1909: Charles Henry Simpson, Major
- 1910: Thomas Ball Silcock
- 1911: Thomas Forder Plowman
- 1912: George Thomas Cooke
- 1913: Preston King
- 1914: Frederick William Spear
- 1915: Harry Thomas Hatt
- 1916: Charles Henry Long
- 1917: Preston King
- 1918: Alfred William Wills
- 1919: Percy Jackman
- 1920: James Henry Colmer
- 1921: Ernest John White
- 1922: Cedric Chivers
- 1923: Charles Henry Hacker
- 1924: Cedric Chivers
- 1925: Cedric Chivers
- 1926: Cedric Chivers
- 1927: Cedric Chivers
- 1928: Cedric Chivers (died in office 30 January 1929)
- 1929: Aubrey Bateman (elected 26 February 1929)
- 1930: Thomas Sturge Cotterell
- 1931: Herbert Chivers
- 1932: Rhodes G Cook
- 1933: Lieutenant Colonel Horace Scott Davey
- 1934: Aubrey Bateman
- 1935: James Sidney Carpenter
- 1936: Walter Farley Long
- 1937: Leonard Graham Abraham Adams (resigned 6 December 1937)
- 1937: Adrian Edmund Hopkins (elected 23 December 1937)
- 1938: Adrian Edmund Hopkins
- 1939: James Sidney Carpenter
- 1940: Aubrey Bateman
- 1941: Aubrey Bateman
- 1942: Aubrey Bateman
- 1943: Joseph Plowman
- 1944: Edgard Clements
- 1945: Herbert Chivers (died in office 23 June 1946)
- 1946: Edgar Clements (elected 5 July 1946)
- 1946: Edward Taylor
- 1947: Sam Day
- 1948: Sam Day
- 1949: Leslie Newby Punter
- 1950: Kathleen Agnes Mabel Harper
- 1951: Reginald Wilfrid Pearson
- 1952: Alleyne William Steward Berry (father of Mary Berry)
- 1953: Adrian Edmund Hopkins
- 1954: William Henry Gallop
- 1955: Alfred Norman Dix
- 1956: Sydney Arthur Smith
- 1957: Tom Jones
- 1958: Hugh Duckworth Roberts
- 1959: Edward William Arthur Mortimer
- 1960: Arthur Cecil Knight
- 1961: William Henry Jordan Shepherd
- 1962: Gulielma Maw
- 1963: Royston Ernest Tucker
- 1964: George Emanuel de Chazal Mayer
- 1965: Ada Elsie May Hanna
- 1966: Ronald Harry Purdie
- 1967: Ronald Fred Emmerson
- 1968: Roy Gordon Hiscocks
- 1969: Alexander Stewart Polson
- 1970: Walter Gower Huggett
- 1971: Mabel Mary Grosvenor
- 1972: Alec Louis Ricketts
- 1973: Thomas John Cornish
- 1974: William Percy Johns
- 1975: Cicely Margaret Edmunds
- 1976: Mary Elizabeth Rawlings
- 1977: Raymond Charles Rosewarn
- 1978: Kenneth John Holloway (died in office 10 December 1978)
- 1979: George Durant Kersley (elected 2 January 1979)
- 1979: John Humphrey Lyons, Major
- 1980: Brian James Hamlen
- 1981: Leslie Albert William Ridd
- 1982: Laurence John Harris Coombs
- 1983: Elgar Spencer Jenkins
- 1984: Anthony John Rhymes
- 1985: Jeannette Farley Hole
- 1986: Samuel Leslie Jane
- 1987: Ian Charles Dewey
- 1988: John James Malloy, Commander
- 1989: Anne Maureen McDonagh
- 1990: Jeffrey William Higgins
- 1991: Denis Reginald Lovelace
- 1992: Eric Jack Trevor Snook
- 1993: Edwina Harding Bradley
- 1994: Howard William Routledge
- 1995: Jeffrey Stephen Manning
- 1996: Margaret Mary Feeny
- 1997: Marian Frances Hammond
- 1998: Ray David Cliffe
- 1999: John Anthony Bailey
- 2000: Angela Godfrey

== 21st century ==
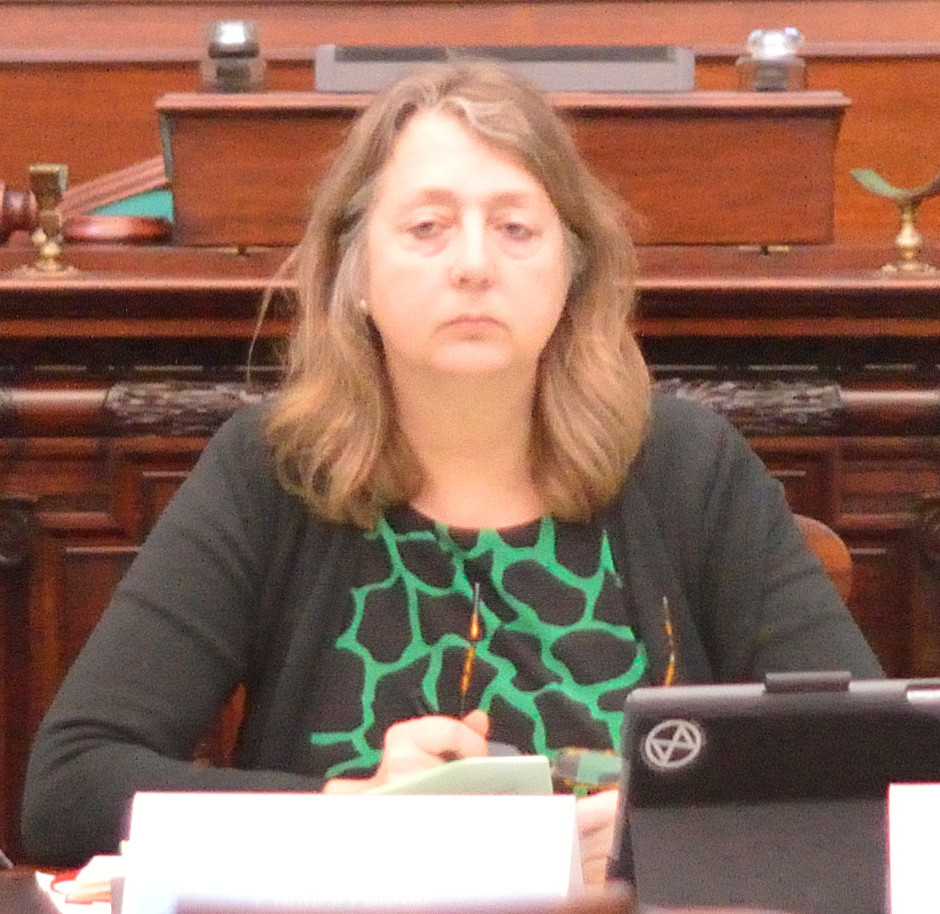
Dine Romero, Mayor of Bath 2023

- 2001: Marian McNeir
- 2002: Loraine Morgan-Brinkhurst
- 2003: David James Hawkins
- 2004: Roger Alan Symonds
- 2005: Peter John Metcalfe
- 2006: Carol Ann Paradise
- 2007: Sharon Grace Ball
- 2008: Tim Mark Ball
- 2009: Colin Vincent Barrett
- 2010: Shaun McGall
- 2011: Bryan Chalker
- 2012: Andrew Furse
- 2013: Malcolm John Henry Lees
- 2014: Cherry Beath
- 2015: William Alexander Sandry
- 2016: Paul Crossley
- 2017: Ian Gilchrist
- 2018: Patrick Anketell-Jones
- 2019: Gerry Curran
- 2020: Manda Rigby
- 2021: June Player
- 2022: Rob Appleyard
- 2023: Dine Romero
- 2024: Michelle Anne O'Doherty
- 2025: Bharat Ramji Nathoo Pankhania (resigned 31 March 2026)
- 2026: Ruth Malloy

== See also ==
- Bath, Somerset#Charter trustees
