= John Bale (MP) =

16th-century English politician

John Bale (by 1531–61/62), of Bath, Somerset, was an English politician.

He was a Member (MP) of the Parliament of England for Bath in 1558.

Parliament of England
Preceded by Henry Hodgkins ?	Member of Parliament for Bath; 1558; With: Edward Ludwell	Succeeded by Edward St Loe; William Robinson
