= John Court =

John Court may refer to:

- John Court (politician) (c. 1544–1599), English Member of Parliament
- John Court (philanthropist) (1846–1933), British-born New Zealand businessman and philanthropist
- John Court (endocrinologist) (1929–2021), Australian endocrinologist and inventor of the Court Needle
- John Court (canoeist) (born 1943), British canoeist
- John Court (filmmaker), producer of Dont Look Back
- John Court (musician), songwriter on A Certain Smile, a Certain Sadness
