= John Walley =

16th-century English politician

John Walley (died 1615) was an English politician.

== Family ==
Walley was the son of William Walley, who was Mayor of Bath in 1573 and 1582. His nephew, John Walley, was a later mayor. William Shareston, MP and Mayor, was described in Walley's will as his 'brother', presumably his brother-in-law.

== Career ==
He was a member (MP) of the parliament of England for Bath in 1589. He was Mayor of Bath in 1585 and 1586.

Parliament of England
Preceded by Thomas Ayshe; William Shareston	Member of Parliament for Bath; 1589; With: John Court	Succeeded by William Shareston; William Price
