= Richard Chapman (MP) =

16th-century English politician

Richard Chapman (c. 1504 – 1580), of Bath, Somerset, was an English politician.

He was a member (MP) of the parliament of England for Bath in October 1553. He was Mayor of Bath in 1554–55.

Parliament of England
Preceded by ? ?	Member of Parliament for Bath; 1553; With: Edward Ludwell	Succeeded by Edward Ludwell; William Crowche
