= Adrian Hopkins =

Adrian Hopkins may refer to:

- Adrian E. Hopkins (1894–1976), British philatelist
- Adrian Hopkins (arms smuggler) (1938–2015), Irish boat captain and IRA arms smuggler
