= Christopher Stone (MP) =

English politician

Christopher Stone (c. 1556 – June 1614), of Bath, Somerset, was an English politician.

He was a member (MP) of the parliament of England for Bath in 1604. He was Mayor of Bath in 1604–05.

Parliament of England
Preceded by William Shareston; William Heath	Member of Parliament for Bath; 1604; With: William Shareston	Succeeded by Sir James Ley; Nicholas Hyde
