= Henry Hodgkins =

Henry Hodgkins may refer to:

- Henry Hodgkins (cricketer) (1868–1952), English cricketer
- Henry Hodgkins (MP) (by 1522–1569/70), English politician

== See also ==
- Henry Hodgkin (1877–1933), British medical doctor and Quaker missionary
