= Henry Harington =

Henry Harington may refer to:

- Henry Harington (musician) (1727–1816), English physician, musician, and author
- Henry Harington (soldier) (died 1613), English and Irish landowner and soldier
