= Dunster (disambiguation) =

Dunster is a village, civil parish and former manor in Somerset, England.

Dunster may also refer to:

- Dunster, British Columbia, Canada
- Dunster Castle, a country house in Dunster, Somerset, England
- Dunster House, a dormitory at Harvard University, US
- Dunster, a 1992 novel by John Mortimer

== People with the Surname ==
- Bill Dunster (born 1960), British architect
- Charles Dunster (1750–1816), British writer and translator
- Chinmaya Dunster (born 1954), English musician and environmentalist
- Frank Dunster (1921–1995), Canadian ice hockey player
- Henry Dunster (1609–1658/9), Anglo-American Puritan clergyman and first president of Harvard College
- Henry Dunster (MP) (1618–1684), English merchant and politician
- Matthew Dunster, English theatre director, playwright and actor
- Robin Dunster (born 1944), Australian nurse and chief of staff of Salvation Army International
- Tomy Dunster, Argentinian actor
