= Henry Hodgkins (MP) =

16th-century English politician

Henry Hodgkins MP
- Born: 1522
- Died: 1569/1570 (aged 47–48)
- Other names: Henry Hodgkyns
- Occupation: politician
- Known for: Member of Parliament for Bath

Henry Hodgkins or Hodgkyns (by 1522 – 1569/70), of Winchcombe and Hailes, Gloucestershire, was an English politician.

He was a Member (MP) of the Parliament of England for Bath in 1555.

Parliament of England
Preceded by John Story; William Crowche	Member of Parliament for Bath; 1555; With: ?	Succeeded by Edward Ludwell; John Bale
