= Great Barton =

Village in Suffolk, England

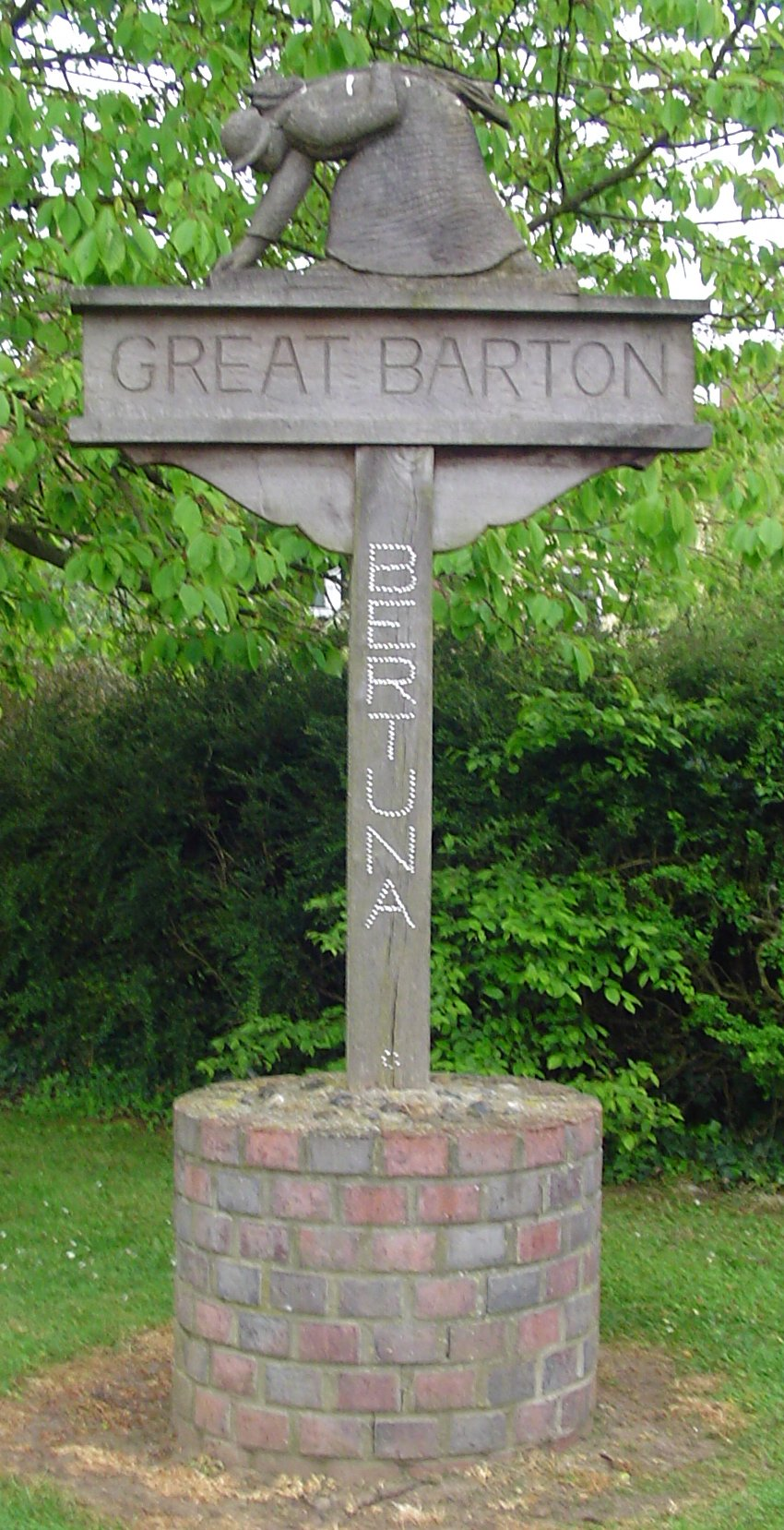
- Great Barton village sign

- Location within Suffolk
- Area: 15.05 km^{2} (5.81 sq mi)
- Population: 2,191 (Including Conyer's Green. 2011)
  - Density: 146/km^{2} (380/sq mi)
- OS grid reference: TL889670
- District: West Suffolk
- Shire county: Suffolk
- Region: East
- Country: England
- Sovereign state: United Kingdom
- Post town: Bury St Edmunds
- Postcode district: IP31
- Dialling code: 01284
- Police: Suffolk
- Fire: Suffolk
- Ambulance: East of England
- UK Parliament: Bury St Edmunds and Stowmarket

Great Barton is a large village and civil parish in the West Suffolk district of Suffolk, England, about 3 miles (5 km) East of Bury St Edmunds on the A143. At the 2011 census the village had a population of 2,191 rising to 2,236 at the 2018 mid year estimate.

All the recorded details of burials in Great Barton Churchyard from 1563 to 1992 have been transcribed from the original registers into alphabetical order, together with cross references to the 517 gravestones, as recorded by the Women's Institute Survey in 1979.

Great Barton is also home to a radio transmission site in the North of the village. The Puttocks Hill transmitter is 69m tall with a total operating power of 5.8kW, broadcasting three DAB multiplexes including BBC & local radio services.

== History ==
The village's name derives from Old English words Bere meaning barley and tūn meaning enclosure, demesne farm, or outlying grange.

The village is first recorded as Bertune in 942 in the will of Bishop Theodred granting lands to his kinsman Osgot, Eadulf's son.

The Domesday Book of 1086 records the village as being in the Theivardestreu Hundred, now known as Thedwastre, and the population was 103 households made up of 22 villagers, 70 freemen, 7 smallholders, and 4 slaves along with 4 cobs, 18 cattle, 44 pigs, 402 sheep, and 2 beehives. The lands were held by Bury Abbey before and after the Norman conquest of England

Great Barton Hall was a country house first built by Robert Audley in 1572. He was the nephew of Thomas Audley, 1st Baron Audley of Walden, who had been Lord Chancellor until his death in 1544.

Around 1783 a post mill was built North East of the main village near Mill Road, this was demolished circa 1920.

In 1816 Sir Henry Bunbury, 7th Baronet, the major land owner in the area, founded one of the earliest allotment schemes in the country. He started granting land to his labouring tenants at the end of 1816 and early 1817 shortly after the food and anti-machinery riots, commonly known as the 'Bread or Blood' riots. The allotments were situated in the land bounded by Vicarage Farm Lane, Mill Road, and Livermere Road. He wrote in his memoirs of the allotments:

My earliest trials, with mere gardens, soon showed me that, while the condition of the cottagers' families was in some degree improved, the men to whom these patches of ground were allotted became more domestic and moral in their habits.

=== Church of the Holy Innocents ===
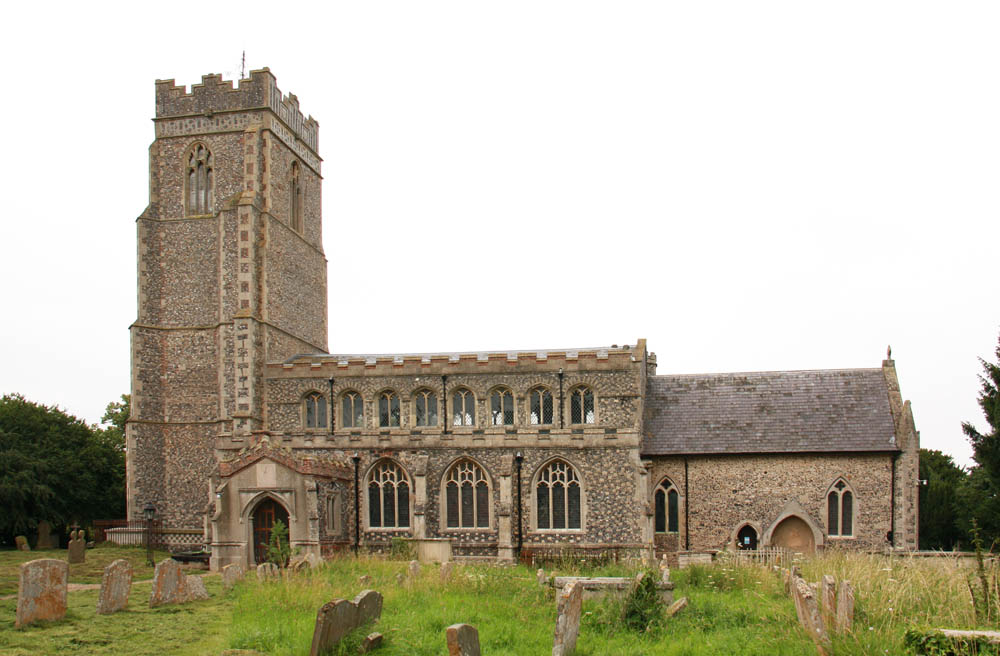
Holy Innocents' Church, Great Barton

The medieval grade I listed parish church is located to the south of the main village and is one of only five churches in the country to be dedicated to the Holy Innocents.

The tower dates from the later half of 15th century. Bequests for its construction were left in wills of Thomas Gatle of Great Livermere (10 marks) and John Stacey of Thurston (5 marks). The tower's parapets feature fine flushwork, which bears some similarities with St Mary's Church in Rougham.

Six bells from the 18th, 19th, and 20th centuries hang in the tower with the largest weighing 8.75 long hundredweight (445 kg; 980 lb).

The chancel is the earliest part of the building, dating from the late 13th century, with hexagonal buttresses at the East end. Four windows with plate tracery featuring a quatrefoil above two trefoil-cusped lancets feature on the North and South sides, two on each all with 19th-century stained glass. The East window mixes plate with bar tracery and has three lancets with the central one cusped and ogee-pointed and three encircled quatrefoils at the top.

== Conyer's Green ==
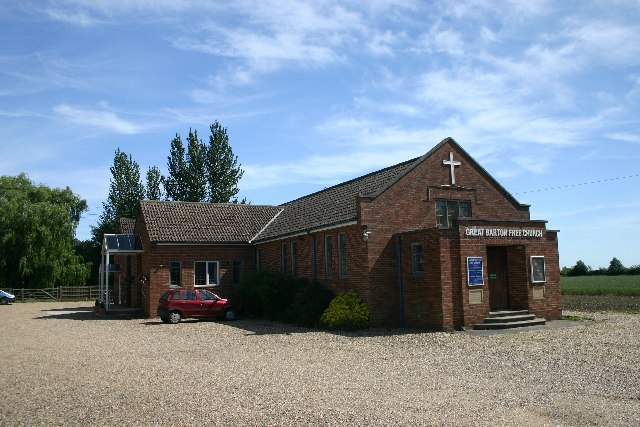
Great Barton Free Church in Conyer's Green

Conyer's Green (52.276°N 0.766°E) is a village in Great Barton.

== Notable residents ==
=== People ===
- Bunbury baronets
- Robert Evans (1899–1981), cricketer
- Preston King (1863–1943), Mayor of Bath
- John Marshall (1837–1879), clergyman and a cricketer
- Edward Adams (1824–1856), naval surgeon and naturalist

=== Horses ===
- Sorcerer (1796–1821), ran mainly at Newmarket and won fifteen of his twenty-one races.
- Smolensko (1810–1829), won the 1813 Epsom Derby and 2,000 Guineas Stakes, raced for two years and was retired to stud in 1815.
