= William Falconer (writer) =

English physician and miscellaneous writer

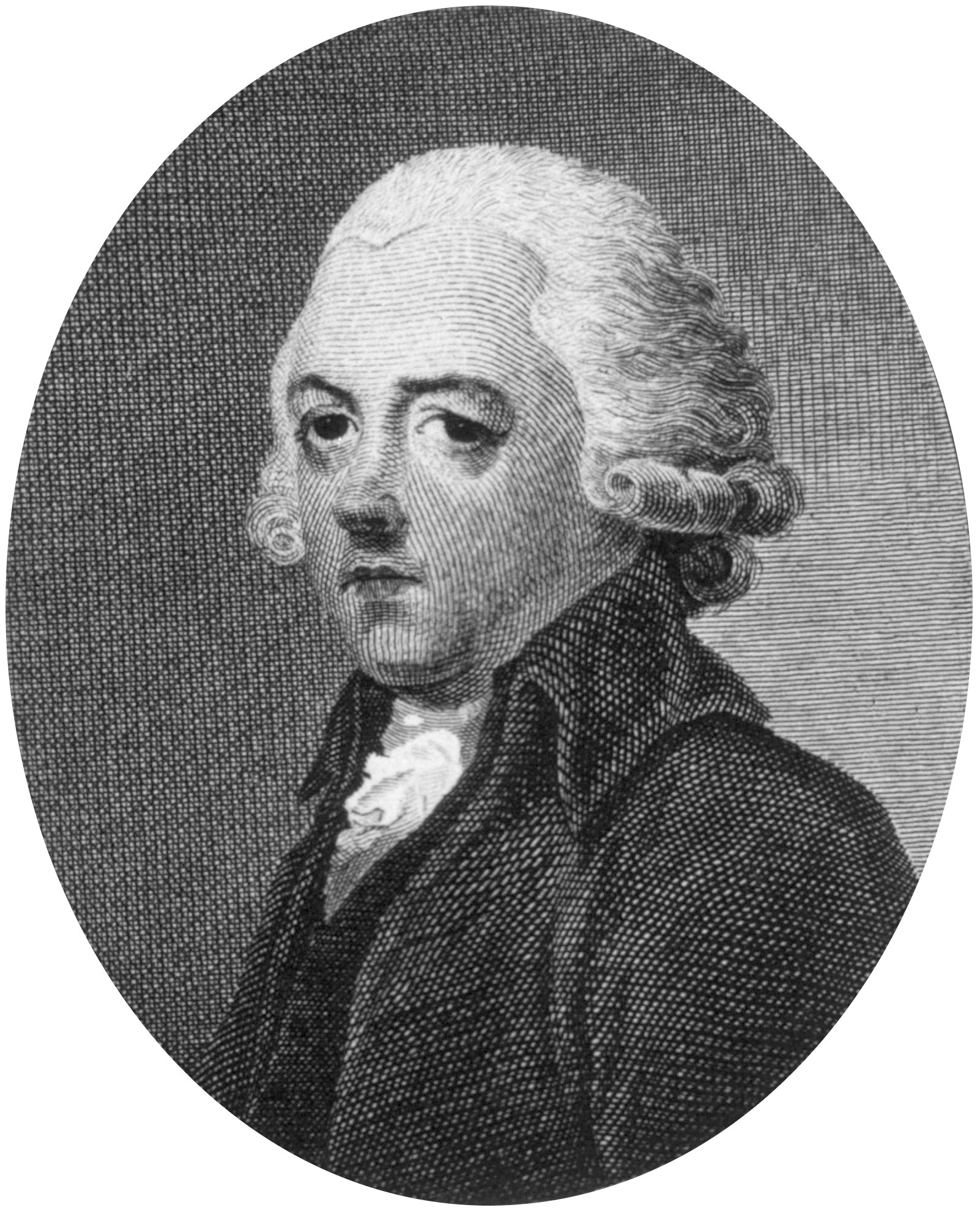
William Falconer

William Falconer (23 February 1744 – 31 August 1824) was an English physician, miscellaneous writer, and also Fellow of the Royal Society.

== Life ==
Falconer was born at Chester on 23 February 1744, the younger of two surviving sons of William Falconer of the Inner Temple, recorder of Chester, by marriage with his second cousin, Elizabeth, daughter of Randle Wilbraham Falconer of Townsend, near Nantwich, Cheshire. He studied medicine at Edinburgh, where he took the degree of M.D. in 1766. From Edinburgh he went to Leyden, where he attended the lectures of Hieronymus David Gaubius and Bernhard Siegfried Albinus, proceeding M.D. there on 28 May 1767. He had been previously admitted an extra-licentiate of the Royal College of Physicians on 12 March 1767. In the same year he was appointed physician to the Chester Infirmary.

After building up a good practice in Chester, Falconer, at the suggestion of Dr. John Fothergill, removed to Bath, Somerset in January 1770, where he was equally successful. On 18 March 1773 he became F.R.S. On 12 May 1784 he was elected physician to the Bath General Hospital, an appointment which he retained until 10 February 1819. He was elected a Foreign Honorary Member of the American Academy of Arts and Sciences in 1800. He died at his house in the Circus, Bath, on 31 August 1824, and was buried at Weston, near the city.

His wife, Henrietta, daughter of Thomas Edmunds of Worsbrough Hall, Yorkshire, had died on 10 September 1803. He left a son, Thomas Falconer. His portrait by Daniel was engraved by James Fittler.

== Works ==
Falconer was close to Samuel Parr, who procured from the Cambridge University Press the publication of his 'Miscellaneous Tracts,’ 1793, and who wrote of him in his 'Remarks on the Statement of Dr. Combe,’ pp. 71–83, as 'a man whose knowledge is various and profound, and whose discriminations upon all topics of literature are ready, vigorous, and comprehensive.' In his will Parr referred to him in most flattering terms. Edmund Burke addressed a letter to Falconer, dated 14 Nov. 1790, thanking him 'for the temperate, judicious, and reasonable paper [on the French revolution] which appeared in the Bath prints some time since.' In 1800 Charles Dunster inscribed to him his 'Considerations on Milton's Early Reading,’ besides mentioning him in his lines on Durdham, written in May 1801.

Falconer was a frequent contributor to the transactions of learned societies. His separate writings are as follows:

- 'An Essay on the Bath Waters in four parts, containing a prefatory Introduction on the Study of Mineral Waters in general,’ London, 1770; 2nd edit. 1772. This, his first work, was dedicated to Dr. John Fothergill.
- 'Observations on Dr. Cadogan's Dissertation on the Gout and all Chronic Diseases,’ London, 1772; 2nd edit., with additions, Bath, 1772.
- 'An Essay on the Bath Waters: on their External Use. In two Parts. I. On Warm Bathing in general. II. On the External Use of the Bath Waters,’ [Bath?], 1774.
- 'Observations and Experiments on the Poison of Copper,’ London, 1774.
- 'An Essay on the Water commonly used in Diet at Bath,’ London, 1776.
- 'Experiments and Observations, in three parts—I. On the dissolvent power of water, impregnated with fixible air, compared with simple water, relatively to medicinal substances. II. On the dissolvent power of water impregnated with fixible air, on the Urinary Calculus. III. On the antiseptic power of water impregnated with fixible air,’ &c., 8vo, London, 1776.
- 'Observations on some of the Articles of Diet and Regimen usually recommended to Valetudinarians,’ London, 1778.
- 'Remarks on the Influence of Climate, ... Nature of Food, and Way of Life, on ... Mankind,’ London, 1781. It was translated into German.
- 'An Account of the late Epidemic Catarrhal Fever, commonly called the Influenza, as it appeared at Bath in ... May and June 1782.'
- 'A Dissertation on the Influence of the Passions upon Disorders of the Body,’ London, 1788. To this essay was awarded the first Fothergillian gold medal. Several editions were published, the third in 1796.
- 'An Essay on the Preservation of the Health of Persons employed in Agriculture, and on the Cure of the Diseases incident to that way of Life,’ Bath, 1789. First printed in the fourth volume of the 'Letters and Papers' of the Bath and West of England Agricultural Society. It was also printed in vol. iv. 430–529 of Dr. Alexander Hunter's 'Georgical Essays,’ 1803–4. An Italian version was published in London, the third edition in 1794.
- 'A brief Account of the newly discovered Water at Middle Hill, near Box in Wiltshire,’ 1789.
- 'An Account of the Efficacy of the Aqua Mephitica Alkalina in Calculous Disorders,’ &c., 3rd edit. London, 1789; 4th edit., with additions, London, 1792; 5th edit. 1798. Translated into Italian, and published at Venice in 1790.
- 'A Practical Dissertation on the Medicinal Effects of the Bath Waters,’ Bath, 1790; 2nd edit., with additions, Bath, 1798; 3rd edit., with considerable additions respecting the 'Use of the Waters in Hip Cases,’ Bath, 1807.
- 'Miscellaneous Tracts and Collections relating to Natural History, selected from the principal writers of antiquity on that subject,’ Cambridge, 1793.
- 'An Account of the Use, Application, and Success of the Bath Waters in Rheumatic Cases,’ Bath, 1795.
- 'Observations respecting the Pulse, intended to point out ... the indications which it signifies, especially in feverish complaints,’ London, 1796. Translated into German, Leipzig, 1797.
- 'An Essay on the Plague; also a Sketch of a Plan of Internal Police,’ London, 1801.
- 'An Examination of Dr. Heberden's Observations on the Increase and Decrease of different Diseases, and particularly the Plague,’ Bath, 1802.
- 'An Account of the Epidemical Catarrhal Fever, commonly called the Influenza, as it appeared at Bath in the Winter and Spring of ... 1803.' Reprinted at p. 253 of Thompson's 'Annals of Influenza' (Sydenham Soc., London, 1852).
- 'A Remonstrance addressed to the Rev. Richard Warner on the subject of his Fast Sermon' [against war], Bath, 1804, published anonymously.
- 'A Dissertation on the Ischias; or the Diseases of the Hip Joint, commonly called a Hip Case, and on the use of the Bath Waters as a Remedy in this Complaint,’ London, 1805. To this essay the Medical Society of London awarded its silver medal (Memoirs of Med. Soc. Lond. vi. 174).
- 'Arrian's Voyage round the Euxine Sea, translated and accompanied with a Geographical Dissertation and Maps. To which are added three Discourses,’ &c. [edited by Thomas Falconer, M.D.], Oxford, 1805.
- 'Observations on the Words which the Centurion uttered at the Crucifixion of our Lord. By a Layman,’ Oxford, 1808.
- 'Dissertation on St. Paul's Voyage from Cæsarea to Puteoli; on the Wind Euroclydon; and on the Apostle's Shipwreck on the Island of Melita. By a Layman,’ Oxford, 1817. The second edition, with additional notes by his grandson, Thomas Falconer (1805–1882), London, 1870, contains a very complete list of Falconer's separate writings, as well as those contributed to serial publications, an enlargement of a list which had appeared in the 'Gentleman's Magazine' for November 1845.

Falconer also wrote an 'Appendix' for Dr. Matthew Dobson's 'Medical Commentary on Fixed Air,’ 1787. His 'Thoughts on the Style and Taste of Gardening among the Ancients,’ in the 'Transactions' of the Manchester Literary and Philosophical Society (i. 297), was enlarged and published separately. 'A Table of the Greek Names of Plants' drawn up by him is to be found in v. 552–79 of Dr. Alexander Hunter's 'Georgical Essays,’ 1803–1804.
