= Richard Gay (MP for Bath) =

English politician

Richard Gay (by 1559–1641), of Walcott Street and Westgate Street, Bath and Claverton, Somerset, was an English politician.

He was a mayor of Bath from 1614 to 1615, and a member (MP) of the parliament of England for Bath in 1626.

Parliament of England
Preceded by Ralph Hopton; Edward Hungerford	Member of Parliament for Bath; 1626; With: William Chapman	Succeeded by John Popham; Sir Walter Long
