= Preston King (mayor) =

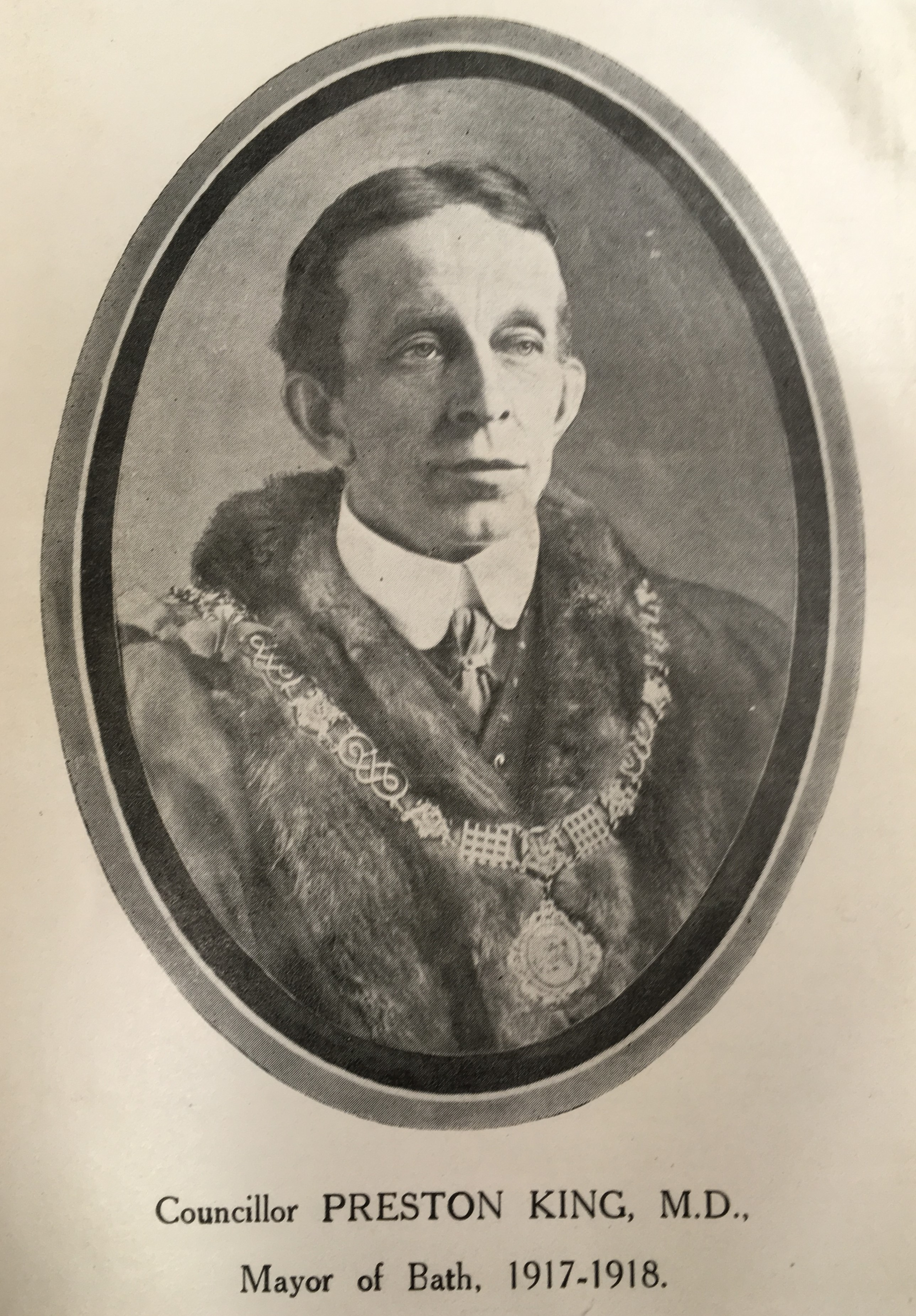
Preston King

Dr Preston King (1862-1943) was the Mayor of Bath in 1913 and again from 1917to 1918.

Dr King was born in Great Barton in Suffolk on 14 September 1862, and educated at Bury St Edmunds Grammar School. He gained entrance to Cavendish Hall, Cambridge in 1881 and after clinical training at St Thomas' Hospital London, and a brief spell as a ship's surgeon, he was appointed as the resident medical house officer (Note: "Houseman", "house officer" and "senior house officer" have all been termed foundation doctor since 2005.) at the Royal Mineral Water Hospital in Bath and assistant physician at the Royal United Hospital (RUH). He married Margaretta Bond in 1898 and served as a councillor for Bath City Council, before being appointed as Mayor in 1913.
