= Ralph Hunt (MP) =

English politician

Ralph Hunt (died c. 1432) of Bath, Somerset, was an English politician.

He was a member (MP) of the parliament of England for Bath in 1417, 1422, 1423 and 1426. He was Mayor of Bath in September 1408 – 1409, 1410–11, 1412–13, 1414–15, 1421–2, and 1429–30.
