= Thomas Welpley =

16th-century English politician

Thomas Welpley (c. 1483 – 1534 or later), of Bath, Somerset, was an English politician.

He was a member (MP) of the parliament of England for Bath in 1529. He was Mayor of Bath in 1530.
