= John Ford Davis =

English physician

- Born: 1773; Bath
- Died: 1 January 1864 (aged 90–91)
- Occupation: Physician

John Ford Davis (1773 – 1 January 1864) was an English physician. He was also mayor of Bath in 1830.

== Biography ==
Davis was born at Bath in 1773, and, after education at the school of the Rev. Edward Spencer, studied medicine, first in London and afterwards in Edinburgh, where he graduated M.D. on 24 June 1797 (Dissertation). He became a licentiate of the Royal College of Physicians of London on 30 September 1808, and soon after began practice at Bath. He was elected physician to the General Hospital there in 1817, and held the office for seventeen years. He died at Bath on 1 January 1864. His published works are his graduation thesis, ‘Tentamen Chemico-Medicum inaugurale de Contagio,’ Edinburgh, 1797, and ‘An Inquiry into the Symptoms and Treatment of Carditis or the Inflammation of the Heart,’ Bath, 1808. The thesis is based upon Isbrand van Diemerbroeck's well-known treatise on the plague, on James Carmichael Smyth's ‘Jail Distemper,’ and on several of the chemical works of that time. It contains no original observation on fever, and, excepting two or three chemical conjectures, is a mere compilation. A copy in the library of the Royal Medical and Chirurgical Society of London has an inscription to Dr. Bostock in the fine pointed handwriting of the author. The book on carditis shows a good deal of reading, but contains only three cases, the last of which alone was observed by Davis himself. The book is, however, interesting as showing what, and how very little, was known of diseases of the heart ten years before the publication of the first edition of Laennec's treatise on auscultation. The anatomical appearances of pericarditis are exactly described, and, though the passages on diagnosis are of course imperfect, it is clear that a great advance in knowledge had been made since Mead, in 1748, had written all that he knew of heart disease upon a single page.
