= John Sanders (painter) =

English painter

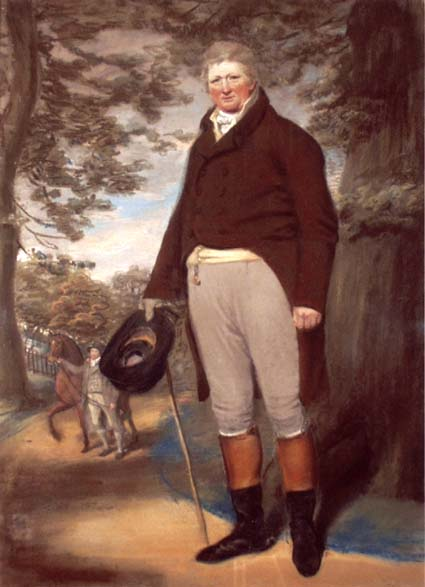
Eleazer Pickwick mayor and inn owner c. 1803 by Sanders

John Sanders (1750–1825) was an English painter.

== Biography ==
Sanders was born in London in 1750. He appears to have been the son of John Saunders, a pastel-painter of merit, who practised at Norwich, Stourbridge in Worcestershire, and elsewhere. Sanders was a student at the Royal Academy in 1769, and earned a silver medal in 1770. He first appears as an exhibitor at the Royal Academy in 1771, when he sent a portrait and A Philosopher. In 1772 he exhibited St. Sebastian and a portrait; in 1773 Jael and Sisera and three portraits; and continued to exhibit pictures in oil and crayon, and drawings, for some years. During these years he was resident in Great Ormond Street, and in 1775 appears in the catalogue of the Royal Academy as John Saunders, junior. Possibly, some works mentioned above were exhibited by his father.

In 1778 he removed to Norwich, but continued to contribute to the Royal Academy portraits, including one of Dr. Crotch the musician, and views of Norwich Cathedral. In 1790 he removed to Bath, where he practised for many years with success as a portrait-painter. A portrait of Judith, countess of Radnor (at Longford Castle), painted in 1821, is a very good example of his work. He is mentioned by Madame d'Arblay in her Journal as painting a portrait of Princess Charlotte of Wales. Sanders died at Clifton in 1825.

During his residence at Norwich, about 1780, he married Rebecca Arnold, and they had five daughters and a son, John Arnold Sanders was born at Bath about 1801 and he was a landscape-painter in London. He was popular as a drawing-master; he emigrated to Canada in 1832.

== Legacy ==
Sanders has at least five paintings in National collections in the United Kingdom.
