= John Popham (died 1638) =

John Popham (born 1603, died c. 1638) was an English politician who sat in the House of Commons from 1628 to 1629.

== Early life ==
Popham was the first son of Sir Francis Popham of Littlecote House, Wiltshire, and his wife Anne Dudley, daughter of John Dudley of Stoke Newington. One source gives his birth year as 1605, while also stating the same year for his brother Alexander.

== Career ==
In 1628, he was elected Member of Parliament for Bath and sat until 1629 when King Charles decided to rule without parliament for eleven years.

== Death ==
Popham died on 23 December 1637, predeceasing his father, and was buried at Littlecote with great pomp.

== Personal life ==
Popham married Mary Harvey, daughter of Sir Sebastian Harvey in 1621. It is said that on the restoration of Charles II, Sir Francis Popham and his son Alexander, John's brother, became so obnoxious that he excepted them both out of the general pardon. Thereupon John removed to Ireland and purchased the Bandon estates, County of Cork. His only son he significantly named Ichabod, "the glory is departed".

Parliament of England
| Preceded by Richard Gay; William Chapman | Member of Parliament for Bath; 1628–1629; With: Sir Walter Long | Parliament suspended until 1640 |
