= Walter Rich =

English politician

Walter Rich (died 1446/7) of Bath, Somerset, was an English politician.

He was a member (MP) of the parliament of England for Bath in April 1414, 1417, December 1421, 1422, 1425 and 1435. He was Mayor of Bath c. September 1416 – 1417, ?1418–19, 1424–25, ?1430–31, July 1438 – c. September 1439, and October 1442 – 1443.
