= Josuah Sylvester =

English poet (1563–1618)

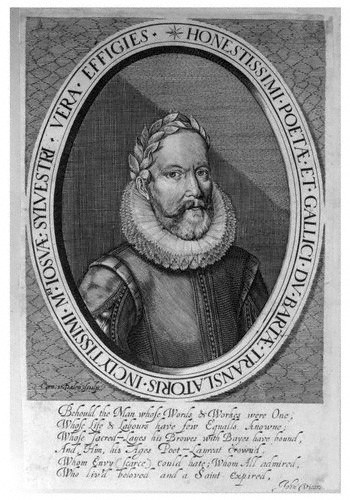
Josuah Sylvester

Josuah Sylvester (1563 – 28 September 1618) was an English poet.

== Biography ==
Sylvester was the son of a Kentish clothier. In his tenth year he was sent to school at King Edward VI School, Southampton, where he gained a knowledge of French. After about three years at school, he appears to have been put to business, and in 1591 the title-page of his Yvry states that he was in the service of the Merchant Adventurers' Company.

He was for a short time a land steward, and in 1606 Henry Frederick, Prince of Wales gave him a small pension as a kind of court poet. In 1613 he obtained a position as secretary to the Merchant Adventurers. He was stationed at Middelburg, in the Low Countries, where he died.

== Works ==
He translated into English heroic couplets the scriptural epic of Guillaume du Bartas.

Our bisexed Parents, free from sin,
In Eden did their double birth begin.

— Du Bartas his divine weekes and workes (1608)

His Essay of the Second Week was published in 1598; and in 1604 The Divine Weeks of the World's Birth. The ornate style of the original offered no difficulty to Sylvester, who was himself a disciple of the Euphuists and added many adornments of his own invention. The Sepmaines of Du Bartas appealed most to his English and German co-religionists, and the translation was immensely popular. It has often been suggested that John Milton owed something in the conception of Paradise Lost to Sylvester's translation. His popularity ceased with the Restoration, and John Dryden called his verse "abominable fustian."

His works were reprinted by A. B. Grosart (1880) in the Chertsey Worthies Library. See also Charles Dunster, Considerations on Milton's early Reading (1800).
