= William Philipps (MP for Bath) =

English politician

William Philipps (died 1444) of Bath, Somerset, was an English politician.

He was a member (MP) of the parliament of England for Bath in 1420 and 1433. He was Mayor of Bath c. Sept. 1427 – 1428, 1431–1433, 1437 – June 1438, Sept. 1441 – 1442, and 1443–44.
