= Robert Draper (MP) =

14th-century English politician

Robert Draper of Bath, Somerset (died 1395/96), was an English politician.

He was a member (MP) of the parliament of England for Bath in 1395 and Mayor of Bath c. September 1395 before May 1396.
