= Richard Widcombe =

English politician

Richard Widcombe or Wydecombe (fl. 1413–1431) of Bath, Somerset, was an English politician.

He was a member (MP) of the parliament of England for Bath in May 1413, November 1414, 1419, 1420, May 1421, 1425, 1426, 1429 and 1431. He was Mayor of Bath in 1417–18, 1426–27 and 1428–29.
