= Dušan Tuma =

Yugoslav slalom canoeist (born 1943)

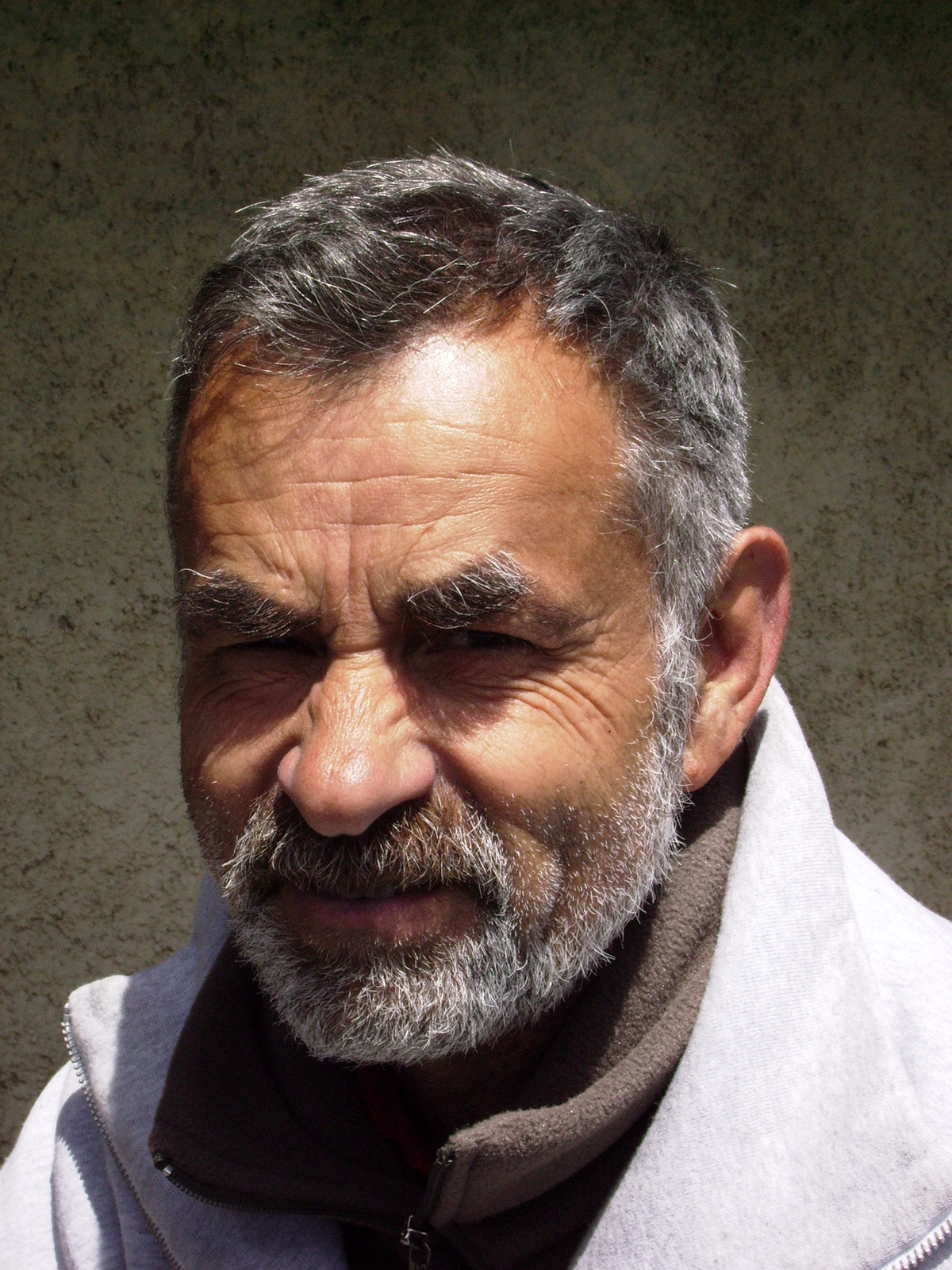
Dušan Tuma

Dušan Tuma (born 30 October 1943 in Ljubljana) is a Yugoslav retired slalom canoeist who competed from the late 1960s to the mid-1970s. He finished 19th in the C-2 event at the 1972 Summer Olympics in Munich.
