= Robert Evans (cricketer) =

English cricketer and educator

Personal information
- Full name: Robert Gordon Evans
- Born: 20 August 1899; Great Barton, Suffolk, England
- Died: 2 August 1981 (aged 81); Sidlesham, Sussex, England
- Batting: Left-handed
- Bowling: Right-arm fast-medium

Domestic team information
- Years: Team
- 1920–1921: Cambridge University
- 1935–1936: Berkshire

Career statistics
Competition	First-class
Matches	14
Runs scored	248
Batting average	22.54
100s/50s	–/–
Top score	46*
Balls bowled	2,244
Wickets	50
Bowling average	23.82
5 wickets in innings	3
10 wickets in match	–
Best bowling	6/45
Catches/stumpings	4/-
- Source: Cricinfo, 25 December 2018

Robert Gordon Evans (20 August 1899 – 2 August 1981) was an English first-class cricketer and educator.

Born at Great Barton in Suffolk, Evans was educated at King Edward VI School in Bury St Edmunds. He served in the latter part of World War I with the Suffolk Regiment as a second lieutenant. After the war he went up to Peterhouse, Cambridge in March 1919. While studying at Cambridge he made his debut in first-class cricket for Cambridge University against the Marylebone Cricket Club at Lord's in 1920. He made eleven further first-class appearances for Cambridge in 1921. Across these matches he scored a total of 197 runs at an average of 28.14, with a highest score of 46 not out. With his right-arm fast-medium bowling he took 45 wickets a bowling average of 22.77, with best innings figures of 6/45, one of three five wicket hauls he took. Evans gained a blue in 1921. He also played two first-class matches for the Free Foresters in 1922 and 1923.

After graduating from Peterhouse, Evans became a teacher. He worked as an assistant master at Dulwich College from 1921–1924, before taking up the same role at Wellington College from 1924. He played minor counties cricket for Berkshire in 1935 and 1936, making eight appearances in the Minor Counties Championship. He later taught at The Prebendal School in Chichester, and retired to nearby Sidlesham, where he died in August 1981.
