= John Clement (MP) =

16th-century English politician

John Clement (by 1502 – 1551/56), of Bath, Somerset, was an English politician.

He was a member (MP) of the parliament of England for Bath in 1539. He was Mayor of Bath in 1550–51.
