= Adrian Hopkins (arms smuggler) =

Irish boat captain and smuggler for the IRA

- Born: October 1, 1938; Dublin
- Died: August 23, 2015 (aged 76); Dublin
- Occupation: Boat captain
- Known for: Smuggling arms for the IRA

Adrian Hopkins was the Irish boat captain (skipper) of the Panamanian-registered vessel Eskund. He is most notable for smuggling arms from Libya into Ireland for the Irish Republican Army, and its offshoots, during the 1980's and The Troubles. Primarily, he operated out of the port of Wicklow.
