= Henry Hodgkins (cricketer) =

English cricketer

Personal information
- Born: 11 November 1868; Cheltenham, Gloucestershire
- Died: 24 June 1952 (aged 83); Dorchester, Dorset
- Batting: Left-handed

Domestic team information
- Years: Team
- 1900-1901: Gloucestershire
- Source: Cricinfo, 30 March 2014

Henry Hodgkins (11 November 1868 – 24 June 1952) was an English cricketer. He played for Gloucestershire between 1900 and 1901.
