= John Court (canoeist) =

British retired slalom canoeist (born 1943)

John Court (born 8 March 1943) is a British retired slalom canoeist who competed in the early 1970s. He competed in the C-2 event at the 1972 Summer Olympics in Munich.
