= Adrian E. Hopkins =

British philatelist (1894–1967)

Adrian E. Hopkins MC
- Adrian Hopkins MC
- Born: 8 October 1894
- Died: 1 March 1967 (aged 72)
- Military career
- Allegiance: United Kingdom
- Rank: Major
- Conflicts: World War I
- Other work: Philatelist

Major Adrian Edmund Hopkins MC (8 October 1894 – 1 March 1967) was a British philatelist who signed the Roll of Distinguished Philatelists in 1947. He was wounded during World War I and lost an arm. Hopkins was the President and a founder member of the Postal History Society and three times Mayor of Bath (1937, 1938 and 1953).

== Selected publications ==
- Talks about postage stamps - Philately in Bristol. 1927.
- A history of wreck covers originating at sea, on land, and in the air. 1940.
