= William Chapman (MP for Bath) =

English politician

William Chapman (fl. 1626) was an English politician.

He was a member (MP) of the parliament of England for Bath in 1626.

Parliament of England
Preceded by Ralph Hopton; Edward Hungerford	Member of Parliament for Bath; 1626; With: Richard Gay	Succeeded by John Popham; Sir Walter Long
