= Eleazer Pickwick =

Businessman

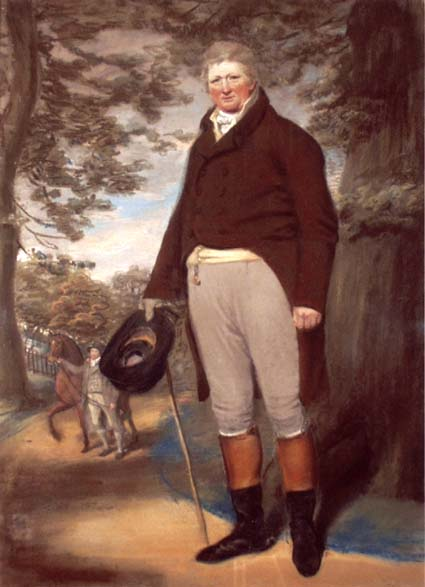
- Pickwick c.1803 by John Sanders
- Born: 1748; Somerset
- Died: 8 December 1837 (aged 88–89); Bath
- Known for: Somerset Coal Canal
- Spouse: Susanna Combs

Eleazer Pickwick (2 Feb 1748 – 8 December 1837) was a British businessman. He became very rich and funded the local canal.

== Life ==
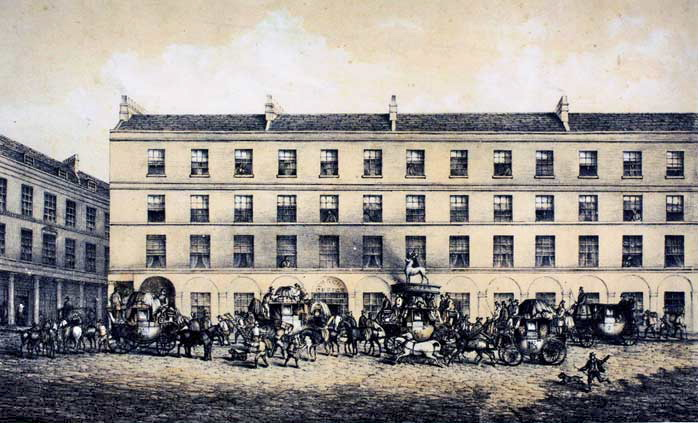
Coaches outside the White Hart Inn in Bath (demolished 1869)

Pickwick's grandfather, Moses, was a foundling who was discovered in an area of Corsham known as Pickwick. This Pickwick was baptised Feb 2, 1748 in Freshford, Bath, UK.

He started a coaching business that came to be based at The White Hart inn opposite the iconic Pump Room. Pickwick's nephew, Moses Pickwick, managed the inn.

In 1794 Pickwick was on the board of the company that was created by the Somerset Coal Canal. Pickwick invested tens of thousands of pounds in the canal business after its bankers refused to lend any more capital.

Pickwick bought Bathford Manor House in 1798.

Pickwick died in Bath in 1837 and was buried in Bathford.

== Legacy ==
The White Hart inn was demolished in 1869 but the sign was reused on another inn. There is a plaque that records the location of the inn and the Pickwicks on the corner of Stall Street and Westgate Street in Bath. The coaching business continued on very successfully under the ownership of Moses Pickwick. From the 1830s business reduced as the railways grew in importance.

It is widely believed that Dickens wrote The Pickwick Papers after visiting Bath using the surname he had seen there. His inn is also mentioned in the works of Jane Austen.

Eleazer Pickwick's nephew, Charles Henry Pickwick-Sainsbury (1829-1885), descendants changed their name to Sainsbury. It has been speculated that part of the motive may have been to discard their lowly born ancestry, favouring their mothers (Harriet Sarah Sainsbury) prestigious line; and Dickens' caricatures that bore their name.
