= Randle Wilbraham Falconer =

British medical writer

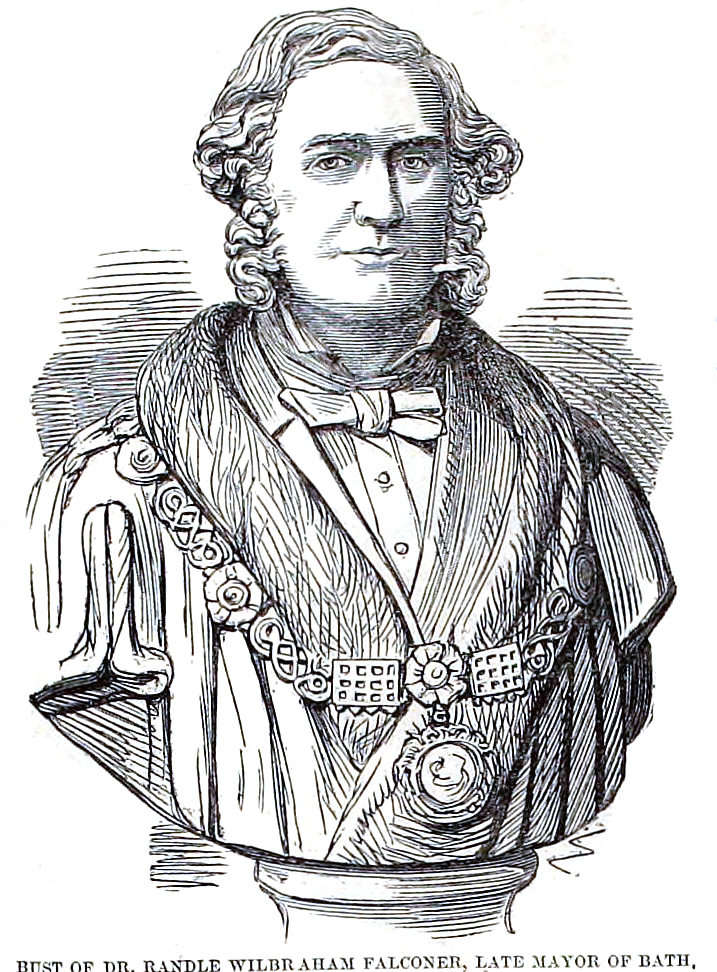

Randle Wilbraham Falconer (1816 – 6 May 1881) was a British medical writer.

== Life ==
Falconer was the fourth son of Thomas Falconer, MD (1772–1839). He was for many years one of the leading physicians of Bath, Somerset, where his grandfather, William Falconer, had also practised. He began the study of medicine at the University of Edinburgh in 1835, and graduated in 1839. At first he settled at Tenby, but in 1847 he moved to Bath, where he continued to practise till his death. He was a man of varied knowledge and accomplishments, fond of archaeology and botany, and sufficiently respected by his fellow-citizens that they elected him mayor in 1857. In addition to his Edinburgh doctorate, he held the honorary title of doctor from Queen's University of Ireland, 1879, and that of fellow from King and Queen's College, Dublin, and was a fellow of the Medico-Chirurgical Society of London. He was one of the founders of the Bath and County Club in 1858.

In 1878, when the British Medical Association met at Bath, he was elected president. He died 6 May 1881. As physician to the Bath General or Mineral Water Hospital he devoted attention to the curative virtues of the baths. He published several works on the subject, as well as contributing cases to the British Medical Journal in 1861.

== Works ==
- Reports of Cures at the Bath General Hospital, 1860
- The Bath Mineral Waters, &c., 1861
- The Baths and Mineral Waters, 5th ed., 1871
