= Charles Dunster =

British writer and translator (1750–1816)

- Born: 1750
- Died: 1816 (aged 65–66)

Charles Dunster (1750–1816) was a British writer and translator.

== Life ==
He was the only son of the Rev. Charles Dunster, prebendary of Salisbury. He was admitted at Oriel College, Oxford, as a commoner in 1767, took his B.A. degree at the end of 1770, migrated early in 1771 to Balliol, and again in 1773 to Trinity.

He was instituted to the Worcestershire rectories of Oddingley and Naunton Beauchamp in 1776, and in 1789 (Arnold, Petworth) to that of Petworth in Sussex. He became rural dean of West Sussex, and held the rectory of Petworth until his death in April 1816.

== Publications ==
He published:

1. The Frogs of Aristophanes, 1785.
2. Cider, a poem by John Philips, with notes provincial and explanatory, including the present most approved method of making cyder in Herefordshire, 1791.
3. Paradise Regained, with notes of various authors, 1795.
4. Considerations on Milton's early reading and the "prima stamina" of his Paradise Lost, 1800 (a work intended to show Milton's obligations to Joshua Sylvester).
5. A Letter on a Passage in St. Matthew, 1804.
6. Discursory Considerations on St. Luke's Gospel, 1805.
7. Discursory Observations on the evidence that St. Matthew's Gospel was the first written, 1806.
8. A Letter on the two last petitions of the Lord's Prayer, 1807.
9. A Letter on the incontrovertible Truth of Christianity, 2nd edition, 1808.
10. Considerations on the hypothesis that St. Luke's Gospel was the first written, 1808.
11. Points at issue between the Editor of Dr. Townson's Works and the Author of Considerations on the hypothesis, &c., 1811.
12. Considerations on the Holy Sacrament, 1811.
13. Tracts on St. Luke's Gospel, 1812. This is merely Nos. 6, 7, 10, and 11 bound up together with a general preface.
14. A Synopsis of the three first Gospels, 1812.
15. Psalms and Hymns adapted for the use of a Parochial Church, 1812.

There is also a sonnet by Dunster on the death of George Monck Berkeley in the Gentleman's Magazine, for April 1795 (lxv. 328).
