= George Pearman =

16th-century English politician

George Pearman of Bath, Somerset (died 1604), was an English politician.

He was a member (MP) of the parliament of England for Bath in 1571 and 1572. He was Mayor of Bath in 1572–73, 1577–78, 1578–79 and 1588–4.
