= William Heath (MP for Bath) =

English politician

William Heath (died 1607), of Bath, Somerset, was an English politician.

He was a Member (MP) of the Parliament of England for Bath in 1597 and 1601. He was Mayor of Bath in 1595–6 and 1597–8.
