= William Crowche =

16th-century English politician

William Crowche (by 1503–1586), of Englishcombe and Wellow, Somerset, was an English politician.

He was a member (MP) of the parliament of England for Calne in 1529, for Leominster in 1547, for Bath in April 1554 and November 1554 and for Melcombe Regis in 1555.
