= Henry Harington (musician) =

English physician, musician and author

Henry Harington M.D.
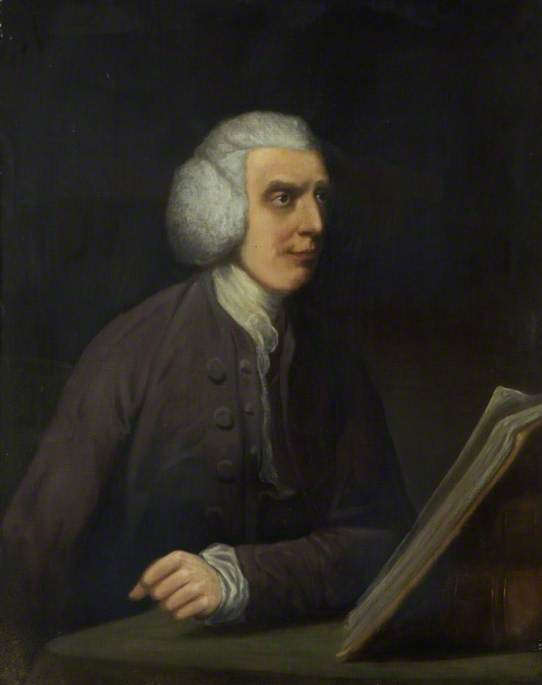
- Henry Harington, portrait c.1774

Background information
- Born: 1727; Kelston, Somerset, England
- Died: 15 January 1816 (aged 88–89) Bath, Somerset, England
- Occupations: Musician, Author, Physician

Henry Harington M.D. (1727–1816) was an English physician, musician and writer.

== Life ==
Born at Kelston, Somerset during September 1727, he was the son of Henry Harington of Kelston, and of Mary, daughter of Richard Backwell. On 17 December 1745 he matriculated at The Queen's College, Oxford, and graduated B.A. in 1749, M.A. in 1752. While at Oxford he joined a musical society set up by William Hayes, and restricted to competent sight-readers.

Dropping a plan of taking holy orders, Harington studied medicine, and in 1753 established himself as a physician at Wells, Somerset. He accumulated his degrees in medicine in 1762.

In 1771 Harington moved to Bath, Somerset, where he composed in spare time, and founded the Bath Harmonic Society. The Duke of York appointed him his physician. He was also an alderman and magistrate of Bath, and served as mayor in 1793. Bath at that time had a substantial population of French exiles caused by the French Revolution, leading to tension, and his term as mayor 1793–4 saw Harington active against radicalism, and attempting to clean up Bath's streets. His efforts went further than the Home Office desired.

A private members’ club founded in 1874, named initially as The People’s Club and Institute Ltd., voted to change the name in around 1890 to reflect the history of the building and honour former resident Dr Henry Harington, Mayor of Bath (1793). This club still operates as The Harington Club, at Harington Place; a site which had once been 14th century stables used by Sir John Harington of Kelston during the Battle of Lansdown in 1643.

Harington died on 15 January 1816, in Bath, and was buried at Kelston, in the church chancel. A monument to him was placed in Bath Abbey.

== Works ==
Harington published:

- A Favourite Collection of Songs, Glees, Elegies, and Canons;
- A second Collection of Songs, Glees, Elegies, Canons, and Catches;
- A third Collection of Trios, Duetts, single Songs, Rotas;
- Songs, Duetts, and other Compositions ... never before published, 1800, edited by his daughter Susanna Isabella Thomas.

These collections had been preceded by compositions issued separately: Eloi! Eloi! or the Death of Christ, a sacred dirge for Passion week; Old Thomas Day; Give me the Sweet Quaker's Wedding; The Stammering Song; and The Alderman's Thumb (a glee). His round How great is the pleasure, and duet How sweet in the woodlands, were once popular. The melody of the latter was taken from a duet, Innamora E poi mancar, from the second act of Giovanni Bononcini's 1720 opera Astarto.

He was also author of:

- Ode to Harmony;
- Ode to Discord;
- The Witch of Wokey (on Wookey Hole, a work that has been put forward as a source for the poem Kubla Khan by Samuel Taylor Coleridge);
- A Treatise on the Use and Abuse of Musick;
- The Geometrical Analogy of the Doctrine of the Trinity consonant to Human Reason, 1806.

== Family ==
Harington married Martha Musgrave in 1752. They had two sons, Sir Edward Harington the writer, and Henry Harington the antiquarian, who died in 1791. Their daughter Susanna Isabella (1762–1835) married Josiah Thomas, later Archdeacon of Bath, in 1794.
