= Edward Baber (barrister) =

16th-century English politician

Sir Edward Baber MP (1531/1532 – 23 September 1578), was an English barrister, judge, and Somerset landowner who twice served as a member of parliament.

== Life ==
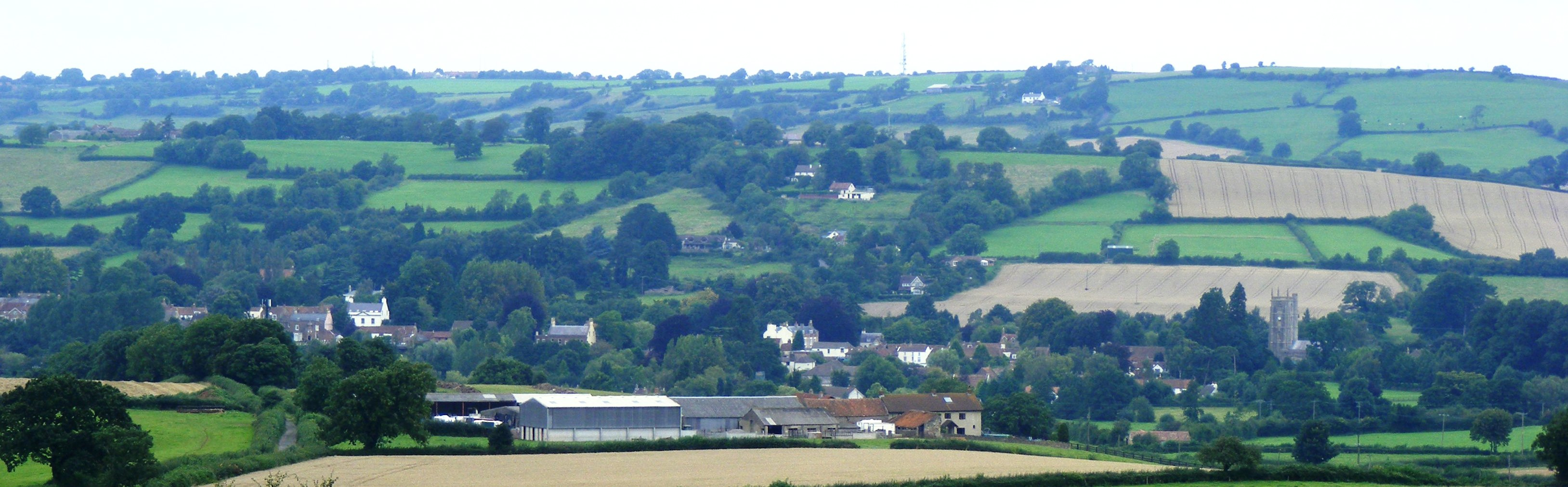
Chew Magna, home of Edward Baber's family for generations

Baber was a younger son of John Baber, who died in 1578, and Agnes Willett, who was born in Butcombe, Somerset, a daughter of John Willett. He was the paternal grandson of another John Baber, who died in 1526 in Chew Stoke, Somerset, and his wife, whom he married ca. 1500, Alice Adams, of a prominent landowning family of Chew Magna, Somerset.

Baber was educated at Lincoln's Inn and was called to the Bar. His legal practice was extremely lucrative and enabled him to become a substantial landowner in Somerset, buying the manors of Aldwick and Regilbury, Nempnett Thrubwell. He also bought a half-share of the family estate at Chew Magna from his elder brother. In addition, he owned houses in London and Bristol.

Baber became Recorder of Bath, Somerset, in about 1571 and was appointed a Serjeant-at-law in 1577. His position as Recorder led to him representing Bath in the House of Commons of England. He was a Member (MP) of the Parliament of England for Bath in the Parliament of 1571 and in that of 1572–1576. During his relatively brief Parliamentary career, he seems to have been a diligent committee man, sitting mainly on those committees where legal expertise was desirable.

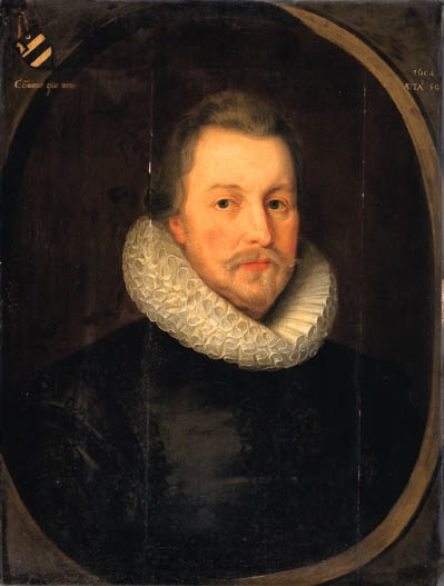
Sir Roger Wilbraham, Solicitor General for Ireland, who married Baber's daughter Mary

Baber married Katherine Leigh, born in 1557 in Stoneleigh, Warwickshire, daughter of Thomas Leigh, who much later was Lord Mayor of London for 1588–1589, and Alice Barker. They had four sons, including Francis, the eldest son and heir, and three daughters, including Mary, who married firstly Sir Roger Wilbraham, Solicitor General for Ireland, and secondly Sir Thomas Delves, 1st Baronet.

Sir Edward Baber died on 23 September 1578 and Katherine Leigh died on 10 March 1600/1601, both in Chew Magna, Somerset.

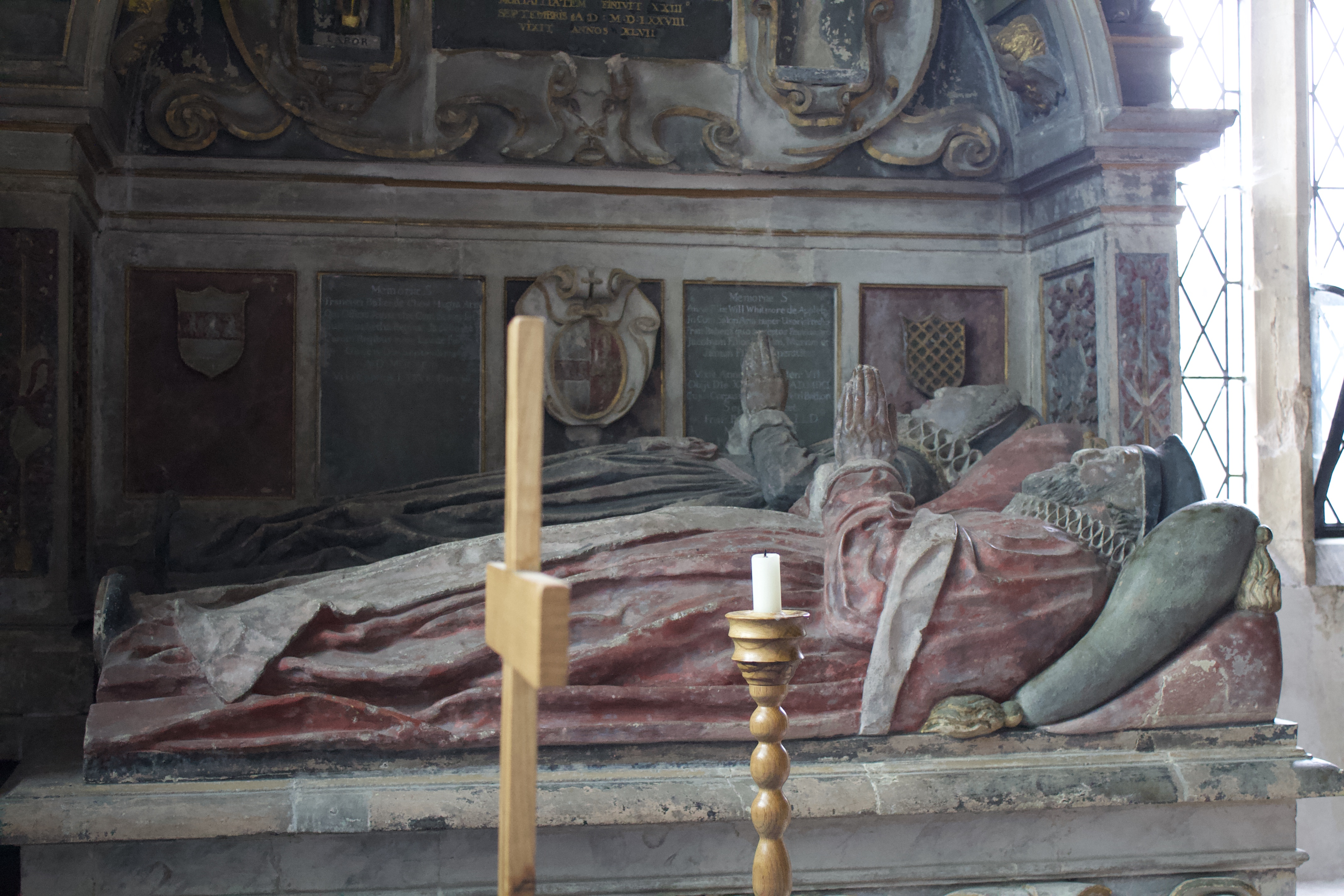
Baber Chapel, St. Andrews, Chew Magna, UK

Sir Edward Baber and his wife Katherine Leigh are entombed at Saint Andrew's Anglican Parish Church in Chew Magna in the Baber Chapel.
