= William Robinson (fl. 1559) =

English politician

William Robinson (fl. 1559) of Bath, Somerset was an English politician.

He was a member (MP) of the parliament of England for Bath in 1559.
