= Edward St. Loe =

16th-century English politician

Edward St. Loe or Seyntlowe (died 1578), of Sutton Court, Somerset and Knighton, near Ramsbury, Wiltshire, was an English politician. He was brother to Sir William St Loe.

He was a member (MP) of the parliament of England for Bath in 1559 and for Downton in 1572.
