= Edward Ludwell =

16th-century English politician

Edward Ludwell (by 1523 – 1563/66), of Bath, Somerset, was an English politician and clothmaker.

He was a member (MP) of the parliament of England for Bath in October 1553, April 1554, 1558 and 1563. He was Mayor of Bath in 1550–1.
