= John Court (politician) =

English politician

John Court (c. 1544 – 7 January 1599) was an English politician.

He was a member (MP) of the parliament of England for Bridgwater in 1586 and for Bath in 1589.
