= William Shareston =

English politician

William Shareston (died 1621) of Bath, Somerset, was an English politician.

He was a member (MP) of the parliament of England for Bath in 1584, 1586, 1593, 1597, 1601 and 1604. He was Mayor of Bath in 1581–82, 1585, 1585–86, 1590–91, 1593–94, 1599–?1600 and 1607–08.
