= William Austin Tucker =

- Born: February 3, 1850; Boston, Massachusetts
- Died: October 25, 1931 (aged 81); New York City, New York
- Spouse: Elizabeth Foster (m. 1876; died 1937)
- Children: Ethel Bethune, Countess of Lindsay; Ralph Tucker; Marion Tucker
- Parent(s): James Tucker; Rebecca Chamberlin
- Relatives: William Lindesay-Bethune, 14th Earl of Lindsay (grandson)

William Austin Tucker (1850 – 1931) was an American banker and founder of Tucker, Anthony & Co..

== Early life ==
Tucker was born in Boston, Massachusetts on February 3, 1850. He was the son of Rebecca (née Chamberlin) Tucker and James Tucker, senior member of the firm of James Tucker & Co., manufacturers. His brother, James Alfred Tucker, married Martha Hamlin Elms.

He was a descendant of Robert Tucker, who came to America from England in 1635.

== Career ==
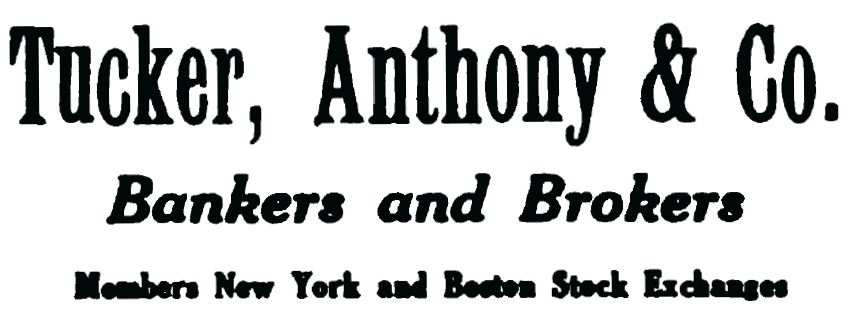
Tucker, Anthony & Company logo, c. 1910

In 1889, Tucker entered the field of banking and finance, at which time he organized the firm of Walter, Tucker & Co. Upon the death in 1892 of Walter, the firm of Tucker, Anthony & Co. was organized, with S. Reid Anthony as a member. Later Phillip L. Saltonstall, Nathan Anthony and Chauncey Eldridge joined the partnership, and the firm eventually became a leader among the banking and brokerage houses in Boston and New York. Tucker retired from active business in 1924, retaining only his interests as director in a number of corporations, including the Knickerbocker Trust Company.

== Personal life ==
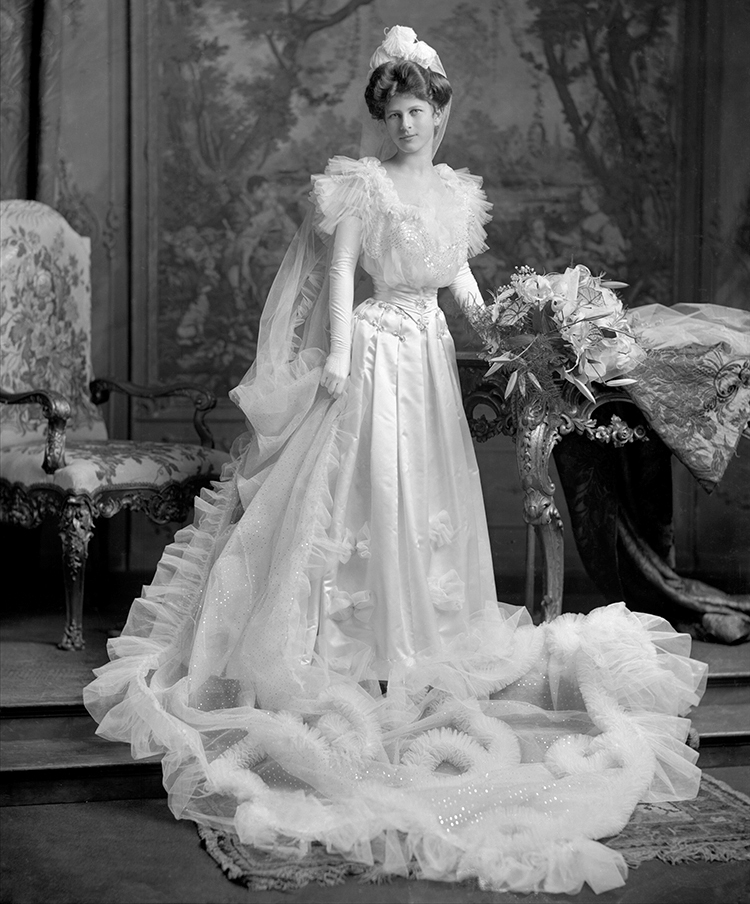
Photograph of his daughter-in-law, Mona House, when she was presented to Court by Mrs. Choate, wife of the United States Ambassador, on 22 June 1904

In 1876, Tucker married Elizabeth Foster (1856–1937), a daughter of The Right Rev. Randolph Sinks Foster, Bishop of Ohio, and Sarah Ann (née Miley) Foster. Together, they were the parents of three children:

- Ethel Tucker (1878–1942), who married Hon. Archibald Lionel Lindsay, second son of David Bethune, 11th Earl of Lindsay and Emily Marian Crosse, in 1900. They divorced in 1906, and she married Ezra C. Fitch Jr., son of Ezra Charles Fitch, president of the Waltham Watch Company, in November 1906. After Fitch's death in 1917, she remarried her first husband, Archibald, in 1921, before he inherited the earldom from his elder brother, Reginald, in 1939.
- Randolph "Ralph" Foster Tucker (1879–1971), who married Mona Louise House, a daughter of "Col" Edward M. House and Elizabeth Louisa "Loulie" (née Hunter) House. Her sister, Janet House, married Gordon Auchincloss (brother of Charles C. Auchincloss and U.S. Representative James C. Auchincloss).
- Marion Tucker (1882–1941), who died unmarried.

While spending the summer in Southampton, New York, he became ill and, after several weeks, Tucker died on October 25, 1931 at 399 Park Avenue, his home in New York. He was buried at Trinity Church Cemetery in New York. His widow died, also at 399 Park Avenue, in March 1937.

=== Descendants ===
Through his son Ralph, he was a grandfather of Jane Tucker (1907–1982), who married Hamilton Osgood Warren (a son of Fiske Warren and Gretchen Osgood Warren) and the Rev. George Prendergast (rector of an Episcopal parish in San Diego), and Randolph Foster Tucker Jr. (1914–1936), who died in a car accident.

Through his daughter Ethel, he was a grandfather of William Lindesay-Bethune, 14th Earl of Lindsay, who married Marjory Cross in 1925 and was the father of four, including David Lindesay-Bethune, 15th Earl of Lindsay.
