= Lindesay =

Lindesay is a surname, and may refer to:

- David Lindesay-Bethune, 15th Earl of Lindsay (1926–1989), British soldier
- James Lindesay-Bethune, 16th Earl of Lindsay (1955-2026), Scottish businessman and politician
- John Lindesay (died 1751), Scottish founder of Cherry Valley, New York State
- Patrick Lindesay (1778–1839), Scottish military officer
- Reginald Lindesay-Bethune, 12th Earl of Lindsay (1867–1939), Scottish nobleman
- Violet Lindesay-Bethune, Countess of Lindsay (born 1993), British socialite, businesswoman and model
- William Lindesay (born 1956), English author, runner and conservationist
- William Lindesay-Bethune, 14th Earl of Lindsay (1901–1985), British soldier
- William Lindesay-Bethune, 17th Earl of Lindsay (born 1990), Scottish nobleman
