= William Lindesay-Bethune, 14th Earl of Lindsay =

British soldier (1901–1985)

The Right Honourable The Earl of Lindsay KStJ
- Born: William Tucker Bethune; 28 April 1901
- Died: 19 October 1985 (aged 84)
- Education: Groton School
- Alma mater: Brasenose College, Oxford
- Spouse: Marjory Cross (m. 1925; died 1985)
- Children: 4, including David
- Parent(s): Archibald Bethune, 13th Earl of Lindsay; Ethel Tucker
- Relatives: David Bethune, 11th Earl of Lindsay (grandfather); William Austin Tucker (grandfather)

William Tucker Lindesay-Bethune, 14th Earl of Lindsay KStJ (28 April 1901 – 19 October 1985) was a British soldier.

== Early life ==
William Tucker Bethune was born on 28 April 1901. He was the only child of Archibald Bethune, 13th Earl of Lindsay and Ethel Tucker (1878–1942). His parents married in 1900, divorced in 1906, and then remarried in 1921.

His paternal grandparents were David Bethune, 11th Earl of Lindsay and Emily Marian (née Crosse) Barnes (the daughter of Robert Crosse and widow of Capt. Edmund Charles Barnes). His paternal uncle was Reginald Lindesay-Bethune, 12th Earl of Lindsay, upon whose 1939 death his father inherited the earldom. His maternal grandparents were Elizabeth "Bessie" (née Foster) Tucker (a daughter of Bishop Randolph Sinks Foster) and William Austin Tucker of Boston, Massachusetts, an American banker with Tucker Anthony who was a director of the Knickerbocker Trust Company.

He was educated at Groton School, in Groton, Massachusetts before attending Brasenose College, Oxford, where he obtained a Master of Arts degree.

== Career ==
A Major in the Scots Guards, he served in World War II where he was wounded. He was admitted to the Royal Company of Archers and was made Honorary Colonel in the Fife and Forfar Yeomanry and was Honorary Colonel of the Scottish Horse between 1957 and 1962. He was appointed Knight of the Most Venerable Order of the Hospital of St. John of Jerusalem.

Upon the death of his father on 15 October 1943, he succeeded as the 13th Viscount of Garnock, the 23rd Lord Lindsay of the Byres, the 13th Lord Kilbirnie, Kingsburn and Drumry, the 14th Lord Parbroath, and the 14th Earl of Lindsay, all in the Peerage of Scotland.

He was a Representative Peer for Scotland between 1947 and 1959. With the granting of seats in the House of Lords to all Scottish peers, which took effect in August 1963 (after the Peerage Act 1963), Lord Lindsay returned in the House of Lords.

He served as a member of the Fife County Council between 1956 and 1963.

== Personal life ==
On 6 January 1925, Bethune married Marjory Cross (d. 1988), a daughter of Arthur John Graham Cross and Marjory Nelson Ritchie Edwards (a daughter of W. Peacock Edwards). After her father's death, her mother married Martin Hawke, 7th Baron Hawke. Together, they were the parents of:

- David Lindesay-Bethune, 15th Earl of Lindsay (1926–1989), who married Hon. Mary-Clare Douglas-Scott-Montagu, daughter of John Douglas-Scott-Montagu, 2nd Baron Montagu of Beaulieu and Alice Pearl Crake, in 1953. They divorced in 1968 and he married Penelope Georgina Crossley, daughter of Anthony Crommelin Crossley and Clare Frances Fortescue Thomson, in 1969.
- Hon. John Martin Lindesay-Bethune (1929–2013), who married Enriqueta Mary Jeanne Koch de Gooreynd, daughter of Peter Maurice Jacques Koch de Gooreynd and Joan Margaret Douglas, in 1953. They divorced in 1976 and he married Jean Maxwell Brickman, daughter of Brig. Eric Brickman, in 1977.
- Lady Elizabeth Marjory Beatrice Lindesay-Bethune (1932–1996), who married Maj. David Laurence Greenacre, son of Brig. Walter Douglas Campbell Greenacre, in 1960. They divorced in 1971.
- Lady Mary Bethune Lindesay-Bethune (1935–2011), who married Capt. Owen Buckingham Varney of Hill House, Dedham, son of Edwin Thomas Varney and Elsie Buckingham, in 1956.

Lord Lindsay died in 1985 and Lady Lindsay died in 1988.

Peerage of Scotland
| Preceded by Archibald Lionel Bethune | Earl of Lindsay; 1943–1985 | Succeeded by David Lindesay-Bethune |
