= Frederick G. Eldridge =

Past president of the Knickerbocker Trust Company

Frederick Gideon Eldridge (May 24, 1837 – July 22, 1889) was president of the Knickerbocker Trust Company in 1884.

== Early life ==
Eldridge was born on May 24, 1837 in Marblehead, Massachusetts. He was the son of Gideon Eldridge and Phebe Ann (née White) Eldridge, a daughter of Lt. John White of the U.S. Navy.

== Career ==
When he was twenty-four years old, he went to India and became a member of the mercantile firm of Atkinson, Tilton & Co. of Calcutta, and of the Bengal Council, a governing body appointed by the governor-general of Bengal, the only American to ever held the position.

After returning to America, he became a member of the brokerage firm Wharton & Eldridge. While a member of the New York Stock Exchange, he was prominent in several large financial operations, and was conspicuous during various panics in Wall Street for his conservative council and conduct. At the time of the organization of the Knickerbocker Trust Company in 1884, he became one of the largest stockholders and its founding president.

== Personal life ==
On November 9, 1859 at St. Bartholomew's Episcopal Church in New York City, Eldridge married Alice Lee Goodrich (1838–1903). She was the daughter of Massachusetts politician Samuel Griswold Goodrich, who was well known as an author under the name "Peter Parley," sister to Emily Goodrich Smith, and niece of Abigail Goodrich Whittelsey and the Rev. Charles A. Goodrich. Together, they were the parents of four children:

- Frederick Larnac Eldridge (1860–1927), who married Elizabeth "Bettie" Barret, a daughter of William T. Barret, in 1887. After her death in 1915, he married Louisa Lee (née Andrews), Bacon, widow of painter Henry Bacon, in 1916.
- Marion Eldridge (1865–1939), a painter who never married.
- Chauncey Eldridge (1867–1924), an engineer; he married Mary Judson, a daughter of Dr. Oliver Albert Judson, in 1900. They divorced in 1911 and he married Mabel Baylis, a daughter of Joseph T. Baylis. After his suicide in 1924, she married William Crane Ivison.
- Howard St. George Eldridge (1880–1958), who married Jessie Harris Cushing, a daughter of Waldo Emerson Cushing, in 1923.

He was a member of the Union Club.

He died at the Hotel Vendome in New York, where he had lived for several years in "one of the most desirable suites of apartments in the hotel" on July 21, 1889. After a funeral at Calvary Protestant Episcopal Church, he was buried in Green-Wood Cemetery. After his death, his widow married Col. Etienne St. George of the Bengal Fusiliers in 1891 before her death in 1903.
