= David Bethune, 11th Earl of Lindsay =

Scottish aristocrat

The Right Honourable The Earl of Lindsay JP DL
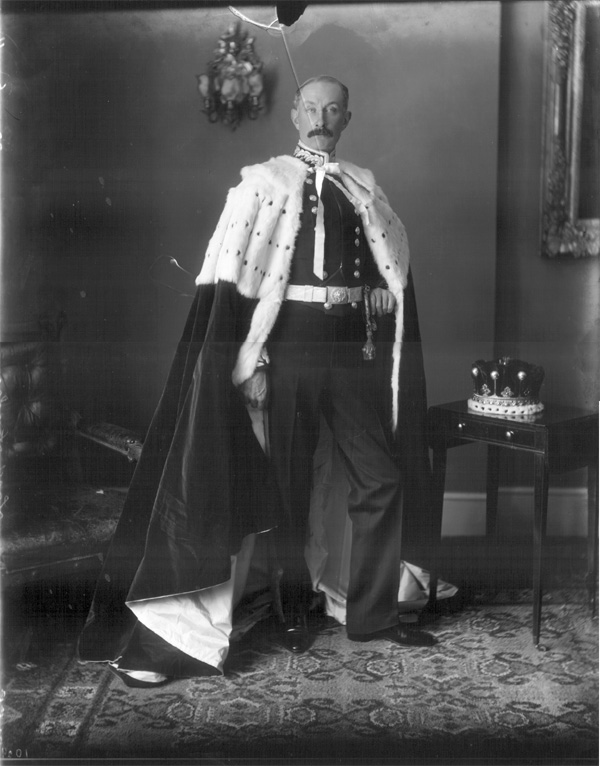
- Lord Lindsay in Peer's robes over Dress Uniform for the Coronation of George V, 1911
- Born: David Clarke Lindsay; 18 April 1832
- Died: 20 March 1917 (aged 84)
- Education: University of St Andrews; Edinburgh University
- Spouse: Emily Marian Crosse (m. 1866; died 1917)
- Children: Reginald Lindesay-Bethune, 12th Earl of Lindsay; Archibald Bethune, 13th Earl of Lindsay; Lady Muriel Kirkpatrick
- Parent(s): David Ayton-Lindsay; Jane Emilia Ayton
- Relatives: William Lindesay-Bethune, 14th Earl of Lindsay (grandson)

David Clarke Bethune, 11th Earl of Lindsay JP DL (né Lindsay; 18 April 1832 – 20 March 1917) was a Scottish aristocrat.

== Early life ==
David Clarke Lindsay was born on 18 April 1832. He was the son of David Ayton-Lindsay of Wormiston House and Jane Emilia Ayton. Among his siblings were Emilia Lindsay (wife of Eric Rudd), Elizabeth Lindsay (wife of Edward Cliff), Margaret Lindsay (wife of Archibald Rodan Hogg), and Alexander Monypenny Lindsay, a practising Advocate.

His paternal grandfather was Patrick Lindsay. His paternal uncle was Maj. Henry Bethune Lindsay of the 3rd Bengal Cavalry. His maternal grandfather was John Ayton of Kippo, Fife.

He was educated at the University of St Andrews and Edinburgh University.

== Career ==
Upon the death of his second cousin once removed John Bethune, 10th Earl of Lindsay on 12 May 1894, he succeeded as the 10th Viscount of Garnock, the 11th Lord Parbroath, the 11th Earl of Lindsay, the 10th Lord Kilbirnie, Kingsburn and Drumry, and the 20th Lord Lindsay of the Byres, all in the Peerage of Scotland. He legally changed to David Clarke Bethune. He served as a Deputy Lieutenant and Justice of the Peace for Fife.

In 1911, Lord and Lady Lindsay attended the coronation of King George V.

== Personal life ==
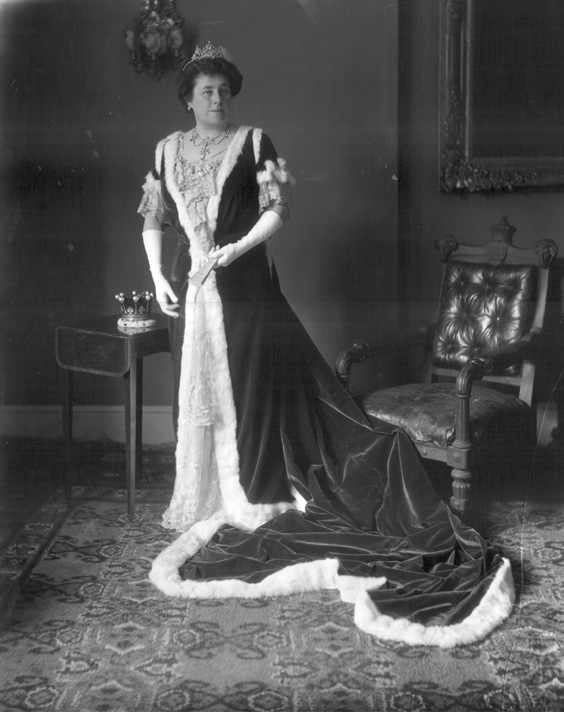
Photograph of his wife, Lady Lindsay, in Peeress's robe for the Coronation of George V, 1911

On 15 August 1866, he married Emily Marian Jennings (née Crosse) Barnes (1836–1920), a daughter of Robert Crosse of Doctors' Commons, London and widow of Capt. Edmund Charles Barnes. Together, they were the parents of:

- Reginald Lindesay-Bethune, 12th Earl of Lindsay (1867–1939), who married Beatrice Mary Shaw, daughter of John Shaw of Welburn Hall, Yorkshire, in 1892.
- Archibald Lionel Bethune, 13th Earl of Lindsay (1872–1943), who married Ethel Tucker, daughter of William Austin Tucker, in 1900. They divorced in 1906, and then remarried in 1921.
- Lady Muriel Maud Stuart Bethune (1874–1936), who married Watkin James Yuille Strang Watkins of Shotton Hall, Shropshire, in 1893. After his death in 1921, she married Joseph Alexander Drummond Kirkpatrick, son of Lt.-Col. T. D. Kirkpatrick of Locksley Hall, Torquay, in 1929.

Lord Lindsay died on 20 March 1917 at age 84. He was succeeded in his titles by his eldest son, Reginald. His widow, the dowager Lady Lindsay, died on 17 October 1920.

=== Descendants ===
Through his second son, he was a grandfather of William Lindesay-Bethune, 14th Earl of Lindsay, who married Marjory Cross in 1925 and was the father of four, including David Lindesay-Bethune, 15th Earl of Lindsay.

Peerage of Scotland
Preceded by John Trotter Bethune	Earl of Lindsay; 1894–1917	Succeeded by Reginald Lindesay-Bethune
