= Merry's Museum =

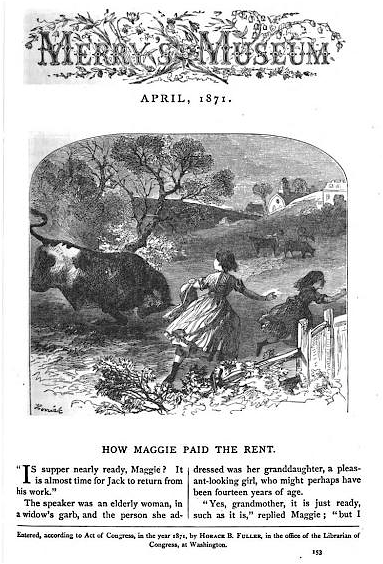
"How Maggie Paid the Rent," Merry's Museum, April 1871

Merry's Museum (1841–1872) was an illustrated children's magazine established by Samuel Griswold Goodrich in Boston, Massachusetts, United States, in 1841. Louisa May Alcott served as editor for a year or so, and also contributed stories, as did Lucretia Peabody Hale, Caroline Hewins, Rebecca Sophia Clarke, Helen W. Pierson, and others. For some time it was published in New York.

== Overview ==
Samuel Griswold Goodrich established the magazine in Boston in 1841. He continued to oversee the magazine until 1854. Goodrich had previously written books for children under the guise of a character named Peter Parley. For his new project, he created a similar figure named Robert Merry who "narrated" the contents of the magazine.

In 1868 Boston's Horace B. Fuller bought the enterprise, and remained as publisher until 1872, when the magazine ceased. At the departure of John N. Stearns, Fuller invited Louisa May Alcott to serve as editor for an annual salary of $500. She found the offer more attractive than another that came around the same time from publisher Thomas Niles suggesting she write a girls' book (which eventually became the novel Little Women), though she had never written juvenile fiction. Alcott hoped to improve the magazine with content that was not only entertaining but also instructive.

Editors included Goodrich (1841–1850); Rev. S.T. Allen (ca.1850); and Alcott (ca.1868–1870). Among the many contributors were Mary Bedford, Katherine Bertha, Emer Birdsey, Kitty Carroll, Margaret Field, Lilian Louise Gilbert, E.B. Greene, Mary B. Harris, Annie Moore, Anna North, Annie Phillips, Mary N. Prescott, Rose Scott, M.G. Sleeper, Olive Thorne, and Elisabeth A. Thurston.
