= Dain Rauscher Wessels =

American brokerage and investment banking firm

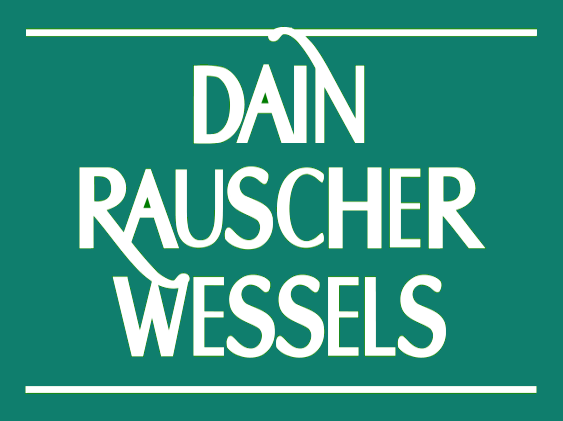
- Company type: Acquired
- Industry: Investment bank, Brokerage
- Predecessor: J.M. Dain & Co. (1929); Dain, Kalman & Quail, Inc. (1967); Dain Bosworth (1979); Dain Rauscher (1997)
- Founded: 1998
- Fate: Acquired by Royal Bank of Canada
- Successor: RBC Dain Rauscher (2000-2008), RBC Wealth Management (2008 - present)
- Headquarters: Minneapolis, Minnesota

Dain Rauscher Wessels was a brokerage and investment banking firm based in Minneapolis, Minnesota. The firm traced its origins to a number of smaller regional securities firms founded in the 1920s and 1930s.

In 2000, Dain Rauscher Wessels was acquired by Royal Bank of Canada and operated as a subsidiary under the name RBC Dain Rauscher. In 2008, RBC ended the usage of the Dain Rauscher brand. It is now known as RBC Wealth Management.

== The company ==
Dain Rauscher Wessels was one of the nation's largest full-service securities firms with 1,300 private client and institutional investment executives, 3,600 employees and in 1998 revenues of more than $740 million. The company serviced individual retail investors primarily in the western U.S., and capital markets and correspondent clients in select markets throughout the nation. The company's broker-dealer was a member of the New York Stock Exchange and other major securities exchanges, as well as the Securities Investor Protection Corp. The company was previously traded on the NYSE under the symbol DRC.

== History ==
=== Early history ===
In 1929, J.M. Dain founded J.M. Dain & Co., which would form the core of what would become Dain Rauscher Wessels, in Minneapolis. Dain had moved to Minneapolis in 1922 to represent a Chicago investment firm but by 1929 had decided to start his own firm. However, with the stock market crash of 1929, Merrill Cohen took control of Dain & Co. in 1933 and helped steer it through the Great Depression and into the 1940s. By the late 1950s, J.M. Dain had grown to 75 employees across eight offices.

Wheelock Whitney was named the head of Dain in 1963 and steered the firm through aggressive growth in the 1960s leading to its initial public offering in 1972. In 1967, Dain merged with Kalman & Co. and then Quail & Co. creating Dain, Kalman & Quail, Inc. with 17 offices across the upper-midwestern U.S. It was also at this point that the Rand Tower in Minneapolis was renamed the Dain Tower. Dain also acquired a number of regional brokerages including J. Cliff Rahal & Co. (1969), Platt, Tschudy & Co. (1970), Woodward-Elwood (1972) and Ralph W. Davis & Co. (1972). In 1972, Dain was listed on the New York Stock Exchange.

=== Dain Bosworth and Inter-Regional Financial Group ===
Rauscher Pierce logo c.1972

Rauscher Pierce Refsnes logo c.1983

In 1973, Dain, Kalman & Quail merged with Bosworth, Sullivan & Co., which itself was created through the merger of Bosworth, Chanute, Loughridge & Co. and Sullivan & Co. Following the merger, a new holding company, Inter-Regional Financial Group was formed to hold the two businesses as separate entities. In 1979 management decided to merge the two businesses creating one of the leading brokerage firms in the midwest, under the brand Dain Bosworth.

In 1981, Inter-Regional Financial Group acquired Rauscher Pierce Refsnes, which at the time was the largest brokerage firm in Texas. Rauscher was established in 1933 as a spinout from the Mercantile National Bank, based in Dallas. After the acquisition of Rauscher Pierce, the business continued to operate under its own brand until the mid-1990s.

=== Dain Rauscher Wessels and the acquisition by Royal Bank of Canada ===
RBC Dain Rauscher logo in use after the acquisition of Dain Rauscher Wessels by Royal Bank of Canada in 2000

In 1997, Dain Rauscher was formed from the merger of Dain Bosworth and Rauscher Pierce Refsnes Inc., both of which were owned by Interra Financial Inc. The combined firm had more than 1,200 brokers and institutional salespeople, focused primarily on the midwestern United States.

In 1998 Dain Rauscher acquired the investment banking firm Wessels, Arnold & Henderson and restructured its Equity Capital Markets unit to become Dain Rauscher Wessels.

Dain Rauscher was acquired by the Royal Bank of Canada in 2000. Shortly after the acquisition of Dain Rauscher, Royal Bank of Canada acquired Tucker Anthony Sutro, an independent brokerage and asset management firm, formed from the combination of Tucker Anthony, a Boston-based firm founded in 1892 and Sutro & Co., a San Francisco based firm founded in 1858. The Tucker Anthony and Sutro branches were integrated into RBC Dain Rauscher in 2002. In 2007, RBC Dain Rauscher acquired J. B. Hanauer, a brokerage firm founded in 1931.

While the Dain Rauscher name was initially used in a number of RBC businesses after the acquisition, the brand was slowly phased out over time. In 2008, RBC changed the name to RBC Wealth Management.

== See also ==
- RBC Plaza
