= George Lindsay-Crawford, 21st Earl of Crawford =

Scottish nobleman (c. 1598–1679)

The Right Honourable The Earl of Crawford and Lindsay
- Born: George Lindsay-Crawford; 14 March 1723; Kilbirnie, Ayrshire, Scotland
- Died: 11 August 1781 (aged 58)
- Spouse: Jean Hamilton (m. 1755; died 1781)
- Children: Jane Montgomerie, Countess of Eglinton; George Lindsay-Crawford, 22nd Earl of Crawford
- Parent(s): Patrick Lindsay-Crawford, 2nd Viscount of Garnock; Margaret Home
- Relatives: John Crawford, 1st Viscount of Garnock (grandfather); George Home of Kello (grandfather)

George Lindsay-Crawford, 21st Earl of Crawford (14 March 1723 – 11 August 1781), styled Lord Kilbirny and Drumry from 1723 to 1738, then 4th Viscount of Garnock from 1738 to 1749; was a Scottish aristocrat.

== Early life ==
Lindsay-Crawford was born on 14 March 1723 at Kilbirnie, Ayrshire, Scotland. He was the second son of Patrick Lindsay-Crawford, 2nd Viscount of Garnock and Margaret Home. His elder brother was John Lindsay-Crawford and his sister, Christian Graham Lindsay-Crawford, married Patrick Bogle.

His paternal grandparents were John Crawford, 1st Viscount of Garnock (son of Hon. Patrick Crawfurd (né Lindsay) and grandson of the 17th Earl of Crawford) and the former Lady Margaret Stuart (a daughter of 1st Earl of Bute). His maternal grandfather was George Home of Kello, Berwickshire.

== Career ==
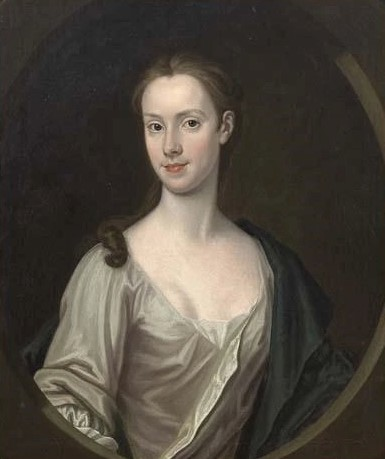
Portrait of his wife, Jean, Countess of Crawford, British School, 18th century

Upon the death of his elder brother, John at age 17, on 22 September 1739, he succeeded as the 4th Lord Kilbirnie, Kingsburn and Drumry and as the 4th Viscount of Garnock both in the Peerage of Scotland. Upon the death of his distant cousin, John Lindsay, 20th Earl of Crawford, on 24 December 1749, he succeeded as the 14th Lord Lindsay of the Byres, the 5th Lord Parbroath, the 5th Earl of Lindsay, and the 21st Earl of Crawford.

He served as a Lieutenant in the Earl of Drumlanrig's Regiment, in Holland.

== Personal life ==
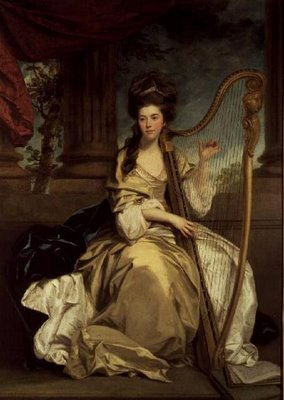
Portrait of his daughter, Jane, Countess of Eglinton, by Joshua Reynolds, 1777

On 26 December 1755, he married Jean Hamilton (c. 1735–1809), daughter of Robert Hamilton of Bourtreehill (the son of Hugh Hamilton of Clongall) and Jean Mitchell. Together, they were the parents of:

- Lady Jean "Jane" Lindsay (d. 1778), who married Archibald Montgomerie, 11th Earl of Eglinton, son of Alexander Montgomerie, 9th Earl of Eglinton and Susanna Kennedy, in 1772. After her death, without issue, he married Frances Twysden, the daughter of Sir William Twysden, 6th Baronet.
- George Lindsay-Crawford, 22nd Earl of Crawford (1758–1808), a Maj.-Gen. in the British Army who never married.

Lord Crawford died on 11 August 1781 at Crawford Lodge, Fife, Scotland. He was succeeded in his titles by his son, George. Upon his son's death in 1808 with no heir, the male line of the 17th Earl of Crawford and 1st Earl of Lindsay became extinct, and his titles passed to the male heirs of the 9th Earl of Crawford, under the regrant of 1642. His widow, the dowager Countess of Crawford, outlived George and both of their children before her death on 6 October 1809.

Peerage of Scotland
Preceded by John Lindsay-Crawford	Viscount of Garnock; 1739–1781	Succeeded by George Lindsay-Crawford
Preceded by John Lindsay	Earl of Crawford; Earl of Lindsay; 1749–1781	Succeeded by George Lindsay-Crawford
