= Gideon Louis Boissevain =

Dutch-American businessman

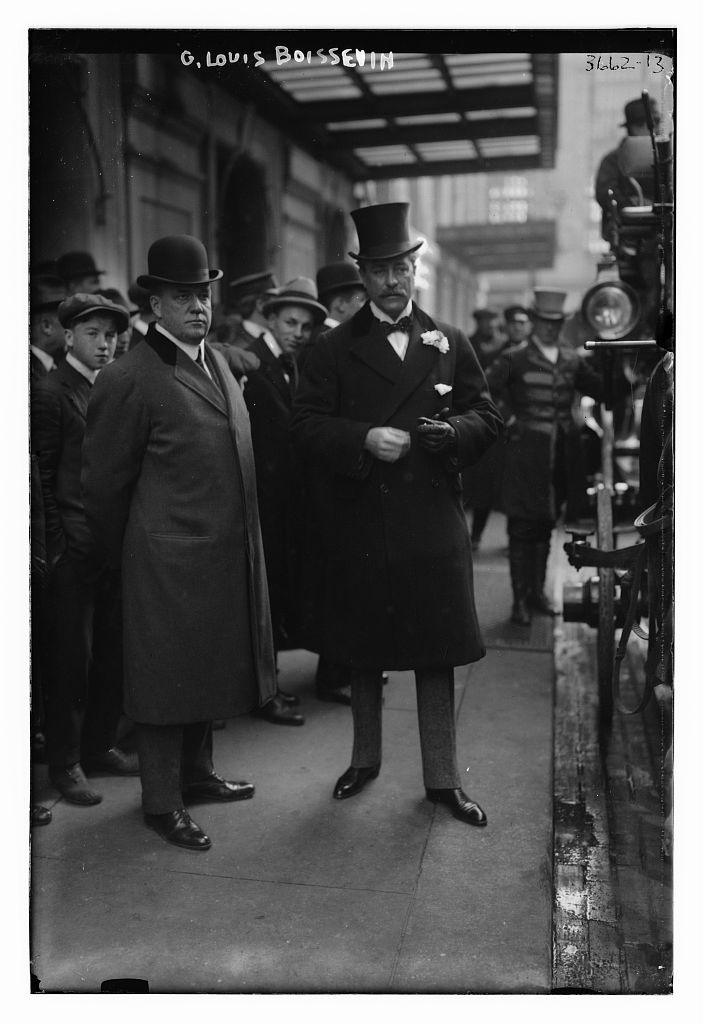
Gideon Louis Boissevain (1870-1924) in Manhattan at the Hotel Biltmore on November 17, 1915

Gideon Louis Boissevain (October 4, 1870 - April 25, 1924) was president of the Hilliard Hotel Company and on the board of directors for the Knickerbocker Trust Company.

== Biography ==
He was born on October 4, 1870, in Amsterdam to Johannes Boissevain and Johanna Juliane Hoek.

He married Arabella Helen Magee in 1899. She was the daughter Emma S. and George J. Magee.

In 1906 their house in New Castle, New York, was robbed and $10,000 worth of jewelry was taken.

He died on April 25, 1924, in Manhattan.

He was buried on Berkeley Memorial Cemetery in Middletown, Rhode Island.
