= Earl of Lindsay =

Title in the Peerage of Scotland

Earldom of Lindsay
- Quarterly, 1st & 4th: Gules, a fess chequy argent and azure, in chief three mullets argent (Lindsay); 2nd & 3rd grand-quarter: counter-quarterly I & IV: Azure, a fess between three lozenges or (Bethune); II & III: Argent, on a chevron sable, an otter's head erased argent (Balfour) all within a bordure embattled or
- Creation date: 8 May 1633
- Created by: King Charles I
- Peerage: Peerage of Scotland
- First holder: John Lindsay, 10th Lord Lindsay
- Present holder: William Lindesay-Bethune, 17th Earl of Lindsay
- Heir apparent: John Reggie James Lindesay-Bethune
- Remainder to: the 1st Earl's heirs male
- Subsidiary titles: Viscount of Garnock; Lord Lindsay of the Byres; Lord Parbroath; Lord Kilbirny and Drumry
- Status: Extant
- Motto: Above the crest: Je ayme ("I love"); Below shield: "Live but Dreid"

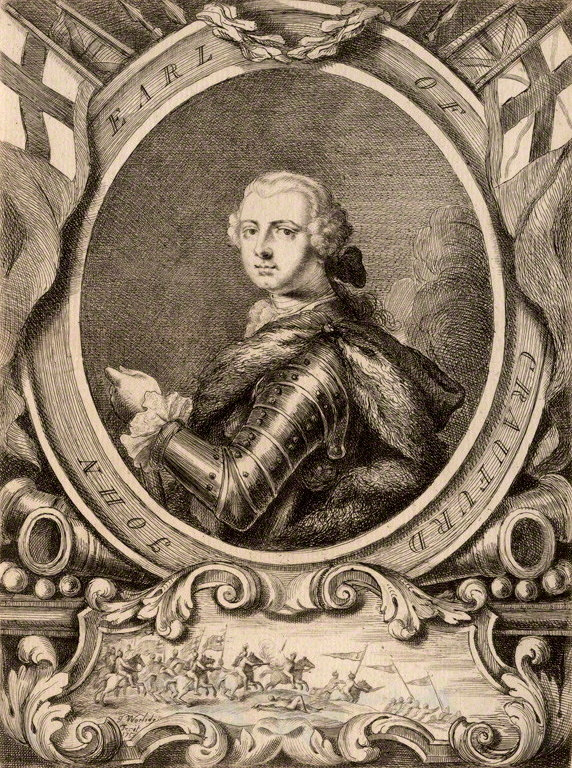
John Lindsay, 20th Earl of Crawford and 4th Earl of Lindsay.

Earl of Lindsay is a title in the Peerage of Scotland. It was created in 1633 for John Lindsay, 10th Lord Lindsay, who later inherited the ancient Earldom of Crawford. The two earldoms remained united until the death of the 22nd Earl of Crawford, also sixth Earl of Lindsay, in 1808. Then the earldom of Lindsay passed to David Lindsay, while the earldom of Crawford became dormant because no-one could prove a claim to the title until 1848. Both David, 7th Earl of Lindsay, and his successor Patrick, 8th Earl of Lindsay, died without sons, and the disputed claim over the earldom was resolved by the House of Lords in 1878 in favour of Sir John Trotter Bethune, 2nd Baronet.

The subsidiary titles of the Earl are: Viscount of Garnock (created 1703), Lord Lindsay of the Byres (1445), Lord Parbroath (1633) and Lord Kilbirny and Drumry (1703), all in the Peerage of Scotland. The title Viscount of Garnock is used as the courtesy title for the eldest son and heir to the Earl.

The family seat is Lahill House, near Upper Largo, Fife.

== Lords Lindsay of the Byres (1445) ==
- John Lindsay, 1st Lord Lindsay (d. 1482)
- David Lindsay, 2nd Lord Lindsay (d. 1490)
- John Lindsay, 3rd Lord Lindsay (d. 1497)
- Patrick Lindsay, 4th Lord Lindsay (d. 1526)
- John Lindsay, 5th Lord Lindsay (d. 1563)
- Patrick Lindsay, 6th Lord Lindsay (1521–1589)
- James Lindsay, 7th Lord Lindsay (1554–1601)
- John Lindsay, 8th Lord Lindsay (d. 1609)
- Robert Lindsay, 9th Lord Lindsay (d. 1616)
- John Lindsay, 10th Lord Lindsay (1611–1676) (created Earl of Lindsay in 1633)

== Earls of Lindsay (1633) ==
- John Lindsay, 1st Earl of Lindsay, 17th Earl of Crawford (1611–1676)
- William Lindsay, 2nd Earl of Lindsay, 18th Earl of Crawford (1644–1698)
- John Lindsay, 3rd Earl of Lindsay, 19th Earl of Crawford (d. 1713)
- John Lindsay, 4th Earl of Lindsay, 20th Earl of Crawford (1702–1749)
- George Lindsay-Crawford, 5th Earl of Lindsay, 21st Earl of Crawford, 4th Viscount of Garnock (1723–1781)
- George Lindsay-Crawford, 6th Earl of Lindsay, 22nd Earl of Crawford, 5th Viscount of Garnock (1758–1808)
- David Lindsay, de jure 7th Earl of Lindsay (d. 1809)
- Patrick Lindsay, de jure 8th Earl of Lindsay (1778–1839)
- Henry Lindsay Bethune, de jure 9th Earl of Lindsay (1787–1851)
- John Trotter Bethune, 10th Earl of Lindsay (1827–1894)
- David Clarke Bethune, 11th Earl of Lindsay (1832–1917)
- Reginald Lindesay-Bethune, 12th Earl of Lindsay (1867–1939)
- Archibald Lionel Bethune, 13th Earl of Lindsay (1872–1943)
- William Tucker Lindesay-Bethune, 14th Earl of Lindsay (1901–1985)
- David Lindesay-Bethune, 15th Earl of Lindsay (1926–1989)
- James Randolph Lindesay-Bethune, 16th Earl of Lindsay (1955−2026)
- William Lindesay-Bethune, 17th Earl of Lindsay (b. 1990)

The heir apparent is the present holder's son John Reggie James Lindesay-Bethune, Viscount Garnock (b. 2026).

== Viscounts of Garnock (1703) ==
- John Lindsay-Crawford, 1st Viscount of Garnock (1669–1708) (grandson of 1st Earl of Lindsay)
- Patrick Lindsay-Crawford, 2nd Viscount of Garnock (1697–1735)
- John Lindsay-Crawford, 3rd Viscount of Garnock (1722–1738)
- George Lindsay-Crawford, 4th Viscount of Garnock (1723–1781) (succeeded as 21st Earl of Crawford and 5th of Lindsay in 1749)

== Bethune Baronets, of Kilconquhar (1836) ==
- Sir Henry Lindsay Bethune, 1st Baronet (1787–1851) (male line descendant of 4th Lord Byres)
- Sir John Trotter Bethune, 2nd Baronet (1827–1894) (recognized as 10th Earl of Lindsay in 1878)

Baronetage of the United Kingdom
Preceded by Brisbane baronets	Bethune baronets of Kilconquhar; 7 March 1836	Succeeded by Campbell baronets of Dunstaffnage
