= John P. Townsend =

American financier (1832–1898)

- A sketch of John P. Townsend, 1894
- Born: John Pomeroy Townsend; 1832; Middlebury, Vermont, U.S.
- Died: 10 September 1898 (aged 65–66); Tarrytown, New York, U.S.
- Occupation: banker
- Title: President of the Knickerbocker Trust; President of the Bowery Savings Bank
- Spouse: Elizabeth A. Baldwin (1853)
- Children: 3

John Pomeroy Townsend (1832–1898) was an American financier of the Gilded Age. He proudly claimed descent from "old Puritan stock", tracing his ancestry to a Thomas Townsend who settled at Lynn, Massachusetts in 1637.

== Business career ==
Townsend was born in Middlebury, Vermont. He began his business career in New York City in 1850. He became Second Vice-President of the Bowery Savings Bank from 1875 to 1883, First Vice-President from 1883 to 1894, and President from 1894 to his death in 1898; he was also President of the Maritime Exchange from 1883 to 1888, Treasurer of the New York Produce Exchange in 1887, a member of the Chamber of Commerce, and from 1889 President of the Knickerbocker Trust Company. Other positions included president of the Municipal Gas-Light Company of Rochester; director of the Long Island Railroad Company; and secretary and manager of the Hospital for the Ruptured and Crippled.

== Writings ==
Townsend was also a writer on economic matters, his publications including the chapters on U.S. Savings Banks in volume 2 of A History of Banking in all the Leading Nations (1896), as well as writings on the Free Silver controversy.

== Death ==
On 10 September 1898, Townsend died suddenly of a heart attack shortly after dinner at his summer house in Tarrytown, New York.
