= George Lindsay-Crawford, 22nd Earl of Crawford =

British Army general

Major-General George Lindsay-Crawford, 22nd Earl of Crawford (31 January 1758 – 30 January 1808) was a Scottish peer and soldier. He served in the British Army and was Lord Lieutenant of Fife.

He was born on 31 January 1758 at Bourtreehill House, Ayrshire, Scotland. He was the son of George Lindsay-Crawford, 21st Earl of Crawford and Jean Hamilton.

== Education ==
He was educated in 1765 at Eton College, Eton, Berkshire, England.

== Titles and offices ==
He succeeded to the titles of 22nd Earl of Crawford, 6th Earl of Lindsay, and 6th Lord Parbroath on 11 August 1781.

He held the office of Lord Lieutenant of Fife between 1794 and March 1807 and again between 20 May 1807 and 30 June 1808.

== Military service ==
His military service included time in both the infantry and the cavalry:

- Commissioned in 1776 into British Army
- Colonel of the 2nd Battalion, 71st Regiment of Foot, Fraser's Highlanders from 1782 to 1783
- Colonel of the 63rd (The West Suffolk) Regiment of Foot between 1789 and 1808.
- Colonel of the Fife Light Horse between 1798 and 1803
- Colonel of the Fifeshire Militia from 18 August 1802
- Gained the rank of Major-General in 1805.

He was influential in the raising of a cavalry regiment in Fife in 1793 and 1794. His correspondence on the subject are held in the British National Archives.

== Death ==
He died on 30 January 1808 at age 49 at Rosel, Ayrshire, Scotland, unmarried.

He was buried at Crawford Lodge, Fife, Scotland.

He died intestate, and his estate was administered in June 1811.

On his death, the male line of the 17th Earl of Crawford became extinct, and his titles passed to the male heirs of the 9th Earl of Crawford, under the re-grant of 1642.

Military offices
Preceded by Sir William Erskine	Colonel of the Fife Light Horse; 1798–1803	Succeeded by Colonel Morison of Naughton
Peerage of Scotland
Preceded by George Lindsay-Crawford	Earl of Crawford; 1752–1825	Dormant de jure successor Alexander Lindsay
Preceded by George Lindsay-Crawford	Earl of Lindsay; 1752–1825	Dormant de jure successor David Lindsay
