= Archibald Bethune, 13th Earl of Lindsay =

Scottish aristocrat (1872–1943)

The Right Honourable The Earl of Lindsay
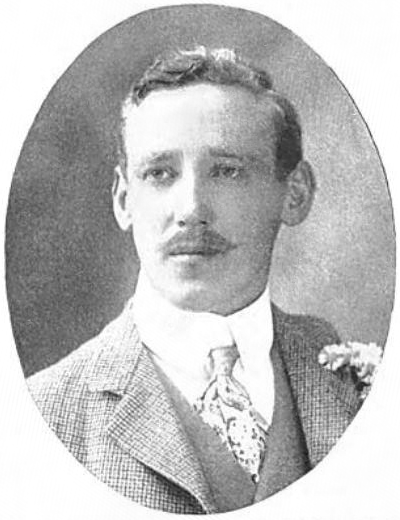
- Born: Archibald Lionel Bethune; 14 August 1872; Frenchay, Gloucestershire, England
- Died: 14 October 1943 (aged 71); Manchester-by-the-Sea, Massachusetts, US
- Spouse(s): Ethel Tucker (m. 1900; div. 1906) Ethel Tucker (m. 1921; died 1942)
- Children: William Lindesay-Bethune, 14th Earl of Lindsay
- Parent(s): David Bethune, 11th Earl of Lindsay; Emily Marian Crosse
- Relatives: Reginald Lindesay-Bethune, 12th Earl of Lindsay (brother)

Archibald Lionel Bethune, 13th Earl of Lindsay (14 August 1872 – 14 October 1943) was a Scottish aristocrat.

== Early life ==
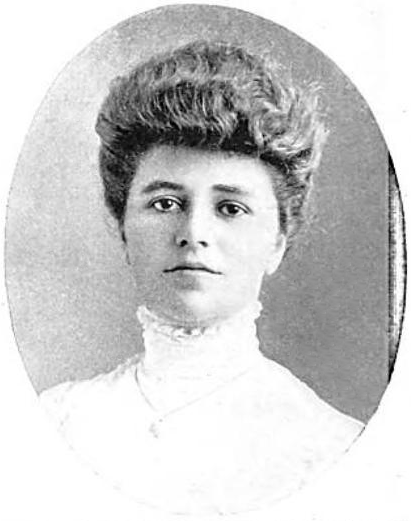
Ethel Tucker

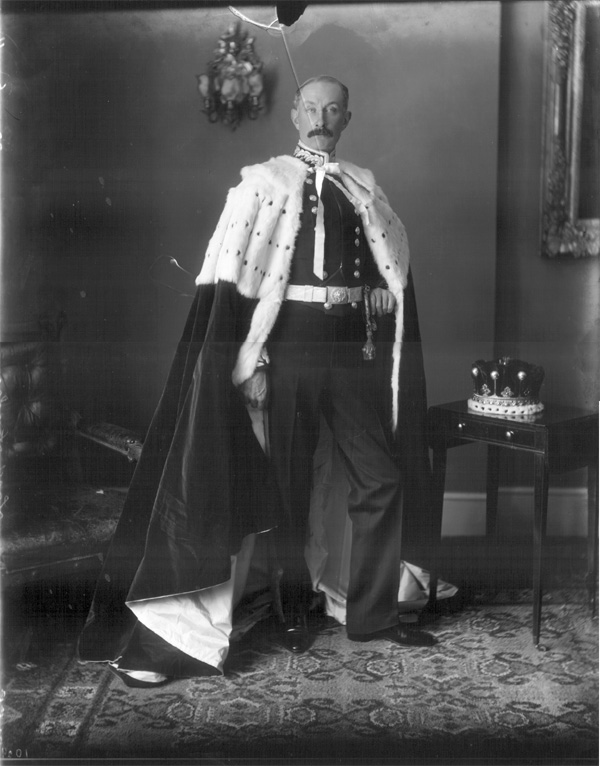
Photograph of his father in Peer's robes over Dress Uniform for the Coronation of George V, 1911

Archibald Lionel Bethune was born on 14 August 1872 at Frenchay, Gloucestershire, England. He was the second son of David Bethune, 11th Earl of Lindsay and Emily Marian Crosse. Before his parents' marriage, his mother was widowed from Capt. Edmund Charles Barnes. His elder brother, Reginald, married Beatrice Mary Shaw (daughter of John Shaw of Welburn Hall), His younger sister, Lady Muriel Maud Stuart Bethune, married Watkin James Yuille Strang Watkins of Shotton Hall, Shropshire, and, after his death, Joseph Alexander Drummond Kirkpatrick.

His paternal grandparents were David Ayton-Lindsay and Jane Emilia Ayton. His maternal grandfather was Robert Crosse of Doctors' Commons, London.

== Career ==
Upon the death of his elder brother Reginald on 14 January 1939, he succeeded as the 22nd Lord Lindsay of the Byres, the 12th Lord Kilbirny and Drumry, the 13th Earl of Lindsay, the 13th Lord Parbroath, the 12th Viscount of Garnock, all in the Peerage of Scotland.

== Personal life ==
On 31 January 1900, Bethune married American heiress Ethel Tucker (1878–1942), daughter of New York banker William Austin Tucker and Elizabeth Foster (a daughter of The Right Rev. Randolph Sinks Foster, Bishop of Ohio). Her brother, Ralph Tucker, married Mona Louise House (a daughter of diplomat Edward M. House). An artist, Ethel had studied at the New York School of Applied Design for Women. Before their divorce in 1906, they were the parents of:

- William Tucker Lindesay-Bethune, 14th Earl of Lindsay (1901–1985), who married Marjory Cross, a daughter of Arthur John Graham Cross and Marjory (née Edwards), (Note: After her father's death in 1906, her mother married Martin Hawke, 7th Baron Hawke in 1916, becoming Baroness Hawke.) in 1925.

Eight months their divorce, she married Ezra C. Fitch Jr., son of the president of the Waltham Watch Company, and remained married to him until his death in 1917. Archibald and Ethel remarried in 1921, moved to 10 Bridge St., Manchester-by-the-Sea, Massachusetts, and remained married until her death on 31 May 1942. Ethel had another sister, Marian, who died unmarried and left half of her estate to her and their son, William, in 1941. Lord Lindsay died on 14 October 1943, aged 71, at his home in Manchester-by-the-Sea, Massachusetts.

=== Descendants ===
Through his only son, he was a grandfather of four, including David Lindesay-Bethune, 15th Earl of Lindsay.

== Notes ==
Peerage of Scotland
Preceded by Reginald Lindesay-Bethune	Earl of Lindsay; 1939–1943	Succeeded by William Tucker Lindesay-Bethune
