= Charles H. Keep =

American banker (1861–1941)

New York State Superintendent of Banks
- In office 1907–1907
- Preceded by: Frederick D. Kilburn
- Succeeded by: Luther W. Mott

Assistant Secretary of the Treasury
- In office 1903–1907
- Preceded by: Milton E. Ailes

Personal details
- Born: Charles Hallam Keep; 1861 Lockport, New York
- Died: August 30, 1941 (aged 79–80) York Harbor, Maine
- Spouse: Margaret Turner Williams (m. 1894)
- Children: Eleanor Williams Keep; Martha Gibson Keep
- Education: Harvard University; Harvard Law School
- Known for: Keep Commission

Charles Hallam Keep (1861 – August 30, 1941) was an American banker who served as Assistant Secretary of the Treasury from 1903 to 1907 where he was chairman of the Keep Commission and later served as president of the Knickerbocker Trust.

== Early life ==
Keep was born in Lockport, New York in 1861. He was a descendant of Roger Wolcott, the colonial governor of Connecticut from 1750 to 1754.

He attended Harvard University, where he graduated in 1882, followed by Harvard Law School.

== Career ==
After graduating from Harvard Law, Keep was admitted to the bar and began practicing law in Buffalo, specializing in investment and financial business. While in Buffalo, he served as a director of the Marine Bank of Buffalo (which after a series of mergers, was acquired by HSBC Bank).

In 1903, Keep was nominated to succeed Milton E. Ailes as Assistant Secretary of the Treasury under Secretary L. M. Shaw during President Theodore Roosevelt's administration. Ailes had resigned to accept the vice presidency of the Riggs National Bank. While in office, President Roosevelt appointed him chairman of the Keep Commission (formally known as the Committee on Department Methods), which revised to a large extent the methods of doing business in the Federal departments. In 1906, Keep along with Lawrence O. Murray (Comptroller of Currency) and Gifford Pinchot (Chief of the United States Forest Service), provided President Roosevelt with a detailed report of the organization and operations of the Department of the Interior. The report highlighted "grave defects" in the structure of the department such as redundant job functions, an "abuse of letter writing" that impeded public business, and rampant inefficiency. The report recommended the dissolution of several divisions.

Keep served as Assistant Secretary until 1907 when he was appointed New York State Superintendent of Banks by New York Governor Charles Evans Hughes. In 1907, he became the first prominent New Yorker to endorse then Secretary of War William Howard Taft for president to succeed Roosevelt. He was in that position for less than a year until he was appointed to the New York Public Service Commission for the Second District. Keep resigned from the Commission in 1908 to assume presidency of the Knickerbocker Trust in March 1908. Keep saw Knickerbocker through its 1912 merger by acquisition with the Columbia Trust Company. Columbia's president, Willard V. King, served as president of the new company and Keep became chairman of the board of the new company, known as the Columbia-Knickerbocker Trust Company, from 1912 to 1923.

== Personal life ==
On May 17, 1894, Keep was married to Margaret Turner Williams (1872–1954) at Trinity Episcopal Church in Buffalo, New York in what was described as "one of the largest weddings of the season". The reception was held at her parents home at 249 North Street. Margaret was a daughter of George L. Williams, (Note: George L. Williams was one of the most prominent bankers in Buffalo. Two years after the Keep wedding, her parents moved into their new home at 672 Delaware Avenue in Buffalo, which had been designed for them by Stanford White of McKim, Mead & White.) and a granddaughter of prominent banker Gibson T. Williams of Buffalo. Together, they were the parents of two daughters:

- Eleanor Williams Keep (1895–1953), (Note: Various sources list Charles' eldest daughter as Eleanor H. Keep, and indicate she died after 1959.) who died unmarried.
- Martha Gibson Keep (d. 1980), who married Morris Shotwell Shipley Jr. who was then working with the National Sugar Refining Company, in 1929.

In the mid-1920s, he bought a six-story, twenty-four-room Beaux Arts style townhouse at 9 East 89th Street in Manhattan that had been designed by Oscar Florianus Bluemner in 1901. His wife had an extensive furniture collection, including pieces by Chippendale and Colonial furniture from Philadelphia. In 1963, over 200 pieces from her collection were sold by her daughters at auction by Parke-Bernet Galleries fetching $188,240.

Keep died at his Summer home in York Harbor, Maine on August 30, 1941. Keep was buried at Forest Lawn Cemetery in Buffalo. After his death, the 89th Street house was sold it to the American Institute for Iranian Art and Archaeology in 1942. His widow died at her home, 101 East 72nd Street, in December 1954.
