= Fifeshire Militia =

Auxiliary unit of the British Army

Fifeshire Militia Fife Artillery
- Active: 1798–1909
- Country: Kingdom of Great Britain (1798–1800); United Kingdom (1801–1909)
- Branch: Militia
- Type: Infantry; Coast artillery
- Size: 1 Battalion; 6 Batteries
- Garrison/HQ: Cupar
- Mottos: Virtute et Opera; Deo Juvante

The Fifeshire Militia was an auxiliary (Note: It is incorrect to describe the British Militia as 'irregular': throughout their history they were equipped and trained exactly like the line regiments of the regular army, and once embodied in time of war they were fulltime professional soldiers for the duration of their enlistment.) regiment raised in Fife, Scotland, in 1798. It served in home defence during the Napoleonic Wars and again during the Crimean War when it was converted into an artillery unit as the Fifeshire Artillery Militia. It served in home defence again during the Indian Mutiny and the Second Boer War. It was disbanded in 1909.

== Scottish Militia ==
The universal obligation to military service in the Shire levy was long established in Scotland: all men aged from 16 to 60 were obliged to serve for a maximum of 40 days in any one year if required, and their arms and equipment were inspected at regular Wapenshaws. In time of war they would be called out by proclamation and by riders galloping through towns and villages bearing the 'Fiery Cross'.

After the restoration of Charles II, the Scottish Parliament passed an Act in 1661, ratified in 1663, creating a militia of 20,000 infantry and 2000 horse, available for Crown service anywhere in Scotland, England or Ireland. These troops were called out in 1689 after the Glorious Revolution. Thereafter the militia in Scotland, as in England, was allowed to decline. After the Jacobite Rising of 1715 a Disarming Act was passed in Scotland and although some militia served in the Government forces against the Jacobite Rising of 1745 there was a reluctance to leave weapons in the hands of those who might rebel.

The English Militia were conscripted by ballot, and this was revived in 1757 during the Seven Years' War. However, there were residual fears of Jacobitism in Scotland, so rather than embody the moribund militia, full-time regiments of 'Fencibles' were raised for the duration of the war by means of normal recruitment. Scotland relied on Fencibles again during the War of American Independence and the early stages of the French Revolutionary War.

== Fifeshire Militia ==
Finally, in 1797 Parliament passed an Act introducing the militia ballot in Scotland. This measure was unpopular and there were anti-ballot riots in the west of the country, but volunteers and paid substitutes were accepted. Ten regiments of Scottish militia were raised in 1798 under the 1797 Act, including the Fifeshire Militia, ranked 5th out of the 10. It was under the command of Colonel James Graham, 3rd Duke of Montrose, given the rank of Brevet Colonel in the army while the regiment was embodied.

During the French Revolutionary and Napoleonic Wars the militia were embodied for a whole generation, and became regiments of full-time professional soldiers (though restricted to service in the British Isles), which the regular army increasingly saw as a prime source of recruits. They served in coast defences, manning garrisons, guarding prisoners of war, and for internal security, while their traditional local defence duties were taken over by the Volunteers and mounted Yeomanry.

During its first embodiment the regiment served in Ireland. The militia were called out again in 1803 after the brief Peace of Amiens. By now the Earl of Crawford (soon to be a major-general) had been appointed colonel of the regiment, with James Wemyss, another regular officer, as his lieutenant-colonel. The regiment served until the end of the Napoleonic Wars. During the summer of 1805, when Napoleon was massing his 'Army of England' at Boulogne for a projected invasion, the regiment with 546 men in 8 companies, under Lt-Col Wemyss, was stationed with the Denbighshire Militia at Chatham Camp in Kent, forming part of Major-General the Hon Edward Finch's Brigade of Guards. In 1806 and 1807 it was guarding Dymchurch Redoubt on the invasion-threatened south coast of England.

After Waterloo the militia were allowed to decline, and were rarely called out for annual training. The militia ballot was not employed after 1831. The regiments were kept in being by a small and declining cadre of staff and non-commissioned officers (who were occasionally used to maintain public order). The adjutant of the Fifeshire Militia from 1833 to 1855 was Capt W. Scott, a veteran of the Peninsular War and the Waterloo who had served in the Scots Fusilier Guards. By the 1830s the Regimental Headquarters (HQ) was at Cupar. Lord lieutenants continued to commission officers into the disembodied regiments: both the colonel of the Fifeshire Militia (James Lindsay, appointed in 1835) and his lieutenant-colonel (John Balfour, appointed in 1843) had served in the Grenadier Guards. From 1842 to 1895 the regiment used the Old Gaol (built in 1814) at Cupar as its HQ.

== Fife Artillery ==
=== Background ===
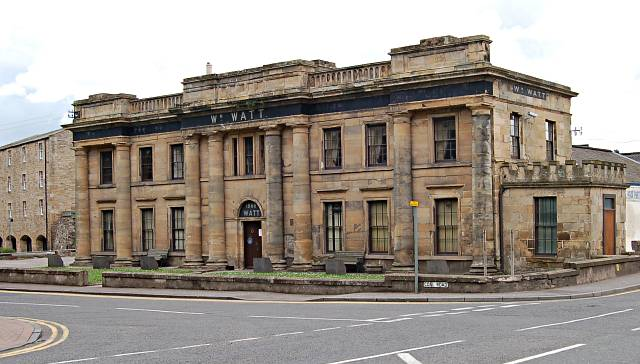
The Old Gaol at Cupar, HQ of the Fifeshire Militia 1842–95.

The Militia of the United Kingdom was revived by the Militia Act 1852, enacted during a period of international tension. As before, units were raised and administered on a county basis, and filled by voluntary enlistment (although conscription by means of the Militia Ballot might be used if the counties failed to meet their quotas). Training was for 56 days on enlistment, then for 21–28 days per year, during which the men received full army pay. Under the Act, Militia units could be embodied by Royal Proclamation for full-time service in three circumstances:

1. 'Whenever a state of war exists between Her Majesty and any foreign power'.
2. 'In all cases of invasion or upon imminent danger thereof'.
3. 'In all cases of rebellion or insurrection'.

The traditional Regimental Colonels were replaced by an Honorary Colonel and a Lieutenant-Colonel Commandant.

The 1852 Act introduced Militia Artillery units in addition to the traditional infantry regiments. Their role was to man coastal defences and fortifications, relieving the Royal Artillery (RA) for active service.

=== Crimean War ===
The Fifeshire Militia was embodied for service during the Crimean War, during which it was converted on or after 18 November 1854 into the Fifeshire Artillery Militia (usually referred to simply as the Fife Artillery). All the officers and most of the other ranks transferred to the new unit. The unit's headquarters remained at Cupar. The Hon Colonel (John Balfour, late of the Grenadier Guards) and Lt-Col Commandant (Brevet Major (retired) Charles Robert Wynne, RA) were both appointed on 23 February 1855. Other officers appointed included two unattached captains to be majors, a former captain in the 79th Foot (Cameron Highlanders) and a captain in the 2nd Bengal Light Cavalry. The adjutant and quartermaster were both former RA. The unit was disembodied in May 1856 at the end of the war.

=== Indian Mutiny ===
Some of the artillery militia were embodied during the Indian Mutiny to relieve Regular RA units for service in India. The Fife Artillery was embodied at Cupar on 25 April 1859 and in May it went to do coastal garrison duty in South West England, first at Devonport, then at Pendennis Castle in June, moving to Falmouth during August. It moved back to Devonport in November where it remained until it was disembodied on 1 September 1860.

Sir Peter Halkett of Pitfirrane, 8th Baronet, was appointed as one of the unit's majors on 12 June 1868. A former captain in the 3rd Light Dragoons, he had served with the Black Watch during the Crimean War. He became Lt-Col Commandant on 30 April 1873 in succession to Lt-Col Wynne.

=== Higher organisation ===
Following the Cardwell Reforms a mobilisation scheme began to appear in the Army List from December 1875. This assigned places in an order of battle of the 'Garrison Army' to artillery militia units: the Fife Artillery's war station was in the Plymouth defences.

Under General Order 72 of 4 April 1882 the RA grouped its batteries into 11 new territorial divisions. These divisions were purely administrative and recruiting organisations, not field formations. Most were formed within the existing military districts into which the United Kingdom was divided, and for the first time associated the artillery militia with the regulars. The regular batteries formed the first brigade, (Note: In contemporary RA terminology, a 'brigade' was a group of independent batteries grouped together for administrative rather than tactical purposes, the officer in command being usually a lieutenant-colonel rather than a brigadier-general or major-general, the ranks usually associated with command of an infantry or cavalry brigade.) in each division, followed by the militia units in order of precedence. As the third-ranking among Scottish artillery militia, the Fife Artillery became the 4th Brigade, Scottish Division, RA. When the Scottish Division was abolished in 1889 the title was altered to Fife Artillery (Southern Division) RA. The brigade had six batteries and 26 permanent staff.

=== Second Boer War ===
Most of the militia was embodied at the time of the Second Boer War to release regular units for service in South Africa. The Fife Artillery was embodied from 4 May to 12 October 1900.

In 1899 all coastal artillery units formally became part of the Royal Garrison Artillery (RGA). When the RGA abandoned its divisional structure in 1902 the militia units changed their titles, the Fife Artillery becoming the Fife Royal Garrison Artillery (Militia) (not to be confused with the 1st Fifeshire Royal Garrison Artillery (Volunteers)).

=== Disbandment ===
After the Boer War, the future of the militia was called into question. There were moves to reform the Auxiliary Forces (Militia, Yeomanry and Volunteers) to take their place in the six Army Corps proposed by St John Brodrick as Secretary of State for War. Some batteries of Militia Artillery were to be converted to field artillery. However, little of Brodrick's scheme was carried out.

Under the sweeping Haldane Reforms of 1908, the Militia was replaced by the Special Reserve, a semi-professional force whose role was to provide reinforcement drafts for Regular units serving overseas in wartime. Although the majority of the officers and men of the Fife RGA (M) accepted transfer to the Special Reserve Royal Field Artillery, becoming the Fife Royal Field Reserve Artillery on 30 August 1908, all these units were scrapped in 1909, the Fife Artillery disbanding on 31 October. Instead the men of the RFA Special Reserve would form Brigade Ammunition Columns for the Regular RFA brigades on the outbreak of war.

=== Commanders ===
Commanders of the Fife Militia included:

Colonel

- Colonel James Graham, 3rd Duke of Montrose, appointed 17 July 1798
- Colonel (Major-General from 1805) George Lindsay-Crawford, 22nd Earl of Crawford, appointed 18 August 1802
- Colonel (|Major-General from 1851) James Lindsay, appointed 11 June 1835

Honorary Colonel

- John Balfour, late of the Grenadier Guards, appointed 23 February 1855, continued in the role into the 1890s
- Sir Peter Arthur Halkett of Pitfirrane, 8th Baronet, former Lt-Col Commandant appointed 28 August 1898, died 1904
- W. Baird, former Lt-Col Commandant, appointed 16 April 1904

Lieutenant-Colonel Commandant

- Charles Robert Wynne, late Brevet Major, RA, appointed 23 February 1855
- Sir Peter Halkett of Pitfirrane, 8th Baronet, late Captain, 3rd Light Dragoons, appointed 30 April 1873
- W. Baird appointed 19 May 1888
- George M. Boothby, late Captain RA, appointed 2 January 1897
- Arthur Moubray 5 June 1905

=== Precedence ===
During the later 18th century the order of precedence for British militia regiments was decided by ballot at the start of each campaigning season. However, The order balloted for at the start of the French Revolutionary War in 1793 remained in force throughout the war. The 10 Scottish regiments raise after that had their own order of precedence, in which the Fifeshire was 5th. On the renewal of war in 1803 a new ballot was held for all the militia regiments in the United Kingdom, in which the Fifeshire was 34th. Although most militia regiments paid little attention to this number, the Fifeshires incorporated the '34' into the design of their buttons. This order of precedence remained in force until 1833. In that year the King drew the lots and the resulting list remained in force with minor amendments until the end of the militia. The regiments raised before the peace of 1783 took the first 69 places, those from the French Wars followed, with Fifeshire being allocated 78th. For a short while after converting to artillery it retained its infantry precedence of 78th, changing to 12th in the artillery militia in September 1855.

=== Uniforms and insignia ===
The uniform of the Fifeshire Militia in 1798 was scarlet with yellow facings, and this was retained until the conversion to artillery. About 1820 the officers' silver Coatee buttons carried the number '34' with a crown above and 'M' below, all within a circle.

On conversion the Fife Artillery adopted the blue uniform with red facings of the Royal Artillery. The officers' Shako plate had a silver figure of the 'Thane of Fife' (an armoured knight riding a caparisoned horse similar to the cap badge of the Fife and Forfar Yeomanry) above the RA 'gun' badge, both superimposed on a gilt eight-pointed star with rays. Across the top of the star there was a scroll inscribed with the Earl of Fife's motto 'DEO JUVANTE' ('By God's assistance'); a scroll bearing the Order of the Thistle's motto, 'NEMO ME IMPUNE LACESSIT' ('No man provokes me with impunity') beneath the Thane was obscured by the gun; a third scroll at the bottom of the star was inscribed 'FIFESHIRE ARTILLERY'. When the unit took the RA's brown fur Busby into use, the plume holder was a flaming grenade, on the ball of which was a crowned circlet carrying the Earl of Fife's secondary motto 'VIRTUTE ET OPERA' ('Courage and Effort') with the Thane of Fife in the centre, the circlet being surrounded by a wreath of thistles. Beneath the wreath was the 'FIFESHIRE ARTILLERY' scroll above a small gun. The undress cap and waistbelt clasp design were similar but without the gun.

When the RA adopted the blue cloth Home Service helmet in 1878, the Fife Artillery was one of the few units to have a special helmet plate. In this version the crown above the Royal Arms of the white metal plate was replaced by the Thane of Fife surmounted by the 'VIRTUTE ET OPERA' scroll in gilt. The gun beneath the Royal Arms was above a scroll bearing 'FIFE ARTILLERY MILITIA'. The Sabretache badge of the same period had the Thane of Fife within a strap with the 'VIRTUTE ET OPERA' motto, above which was a crown surmounted by the Scottish Lion rampant, the whole surrounded by a wreath. However, the unique helmet plate was replaced in 1882 by a standard Scottish Division plate with 'FIFE ARTILLERY' in the lower scroll.

== See also ==
- Militia (Great Britain)
- Militia (United Kingdom)
- Militia Artillery units of the United Kingdom and Colonies
- 1st Fife Artillery Volunteers
- Militia Artillery units of the United Kingdom and Colonies
