= Randolph Sinks Foster =

American bishop

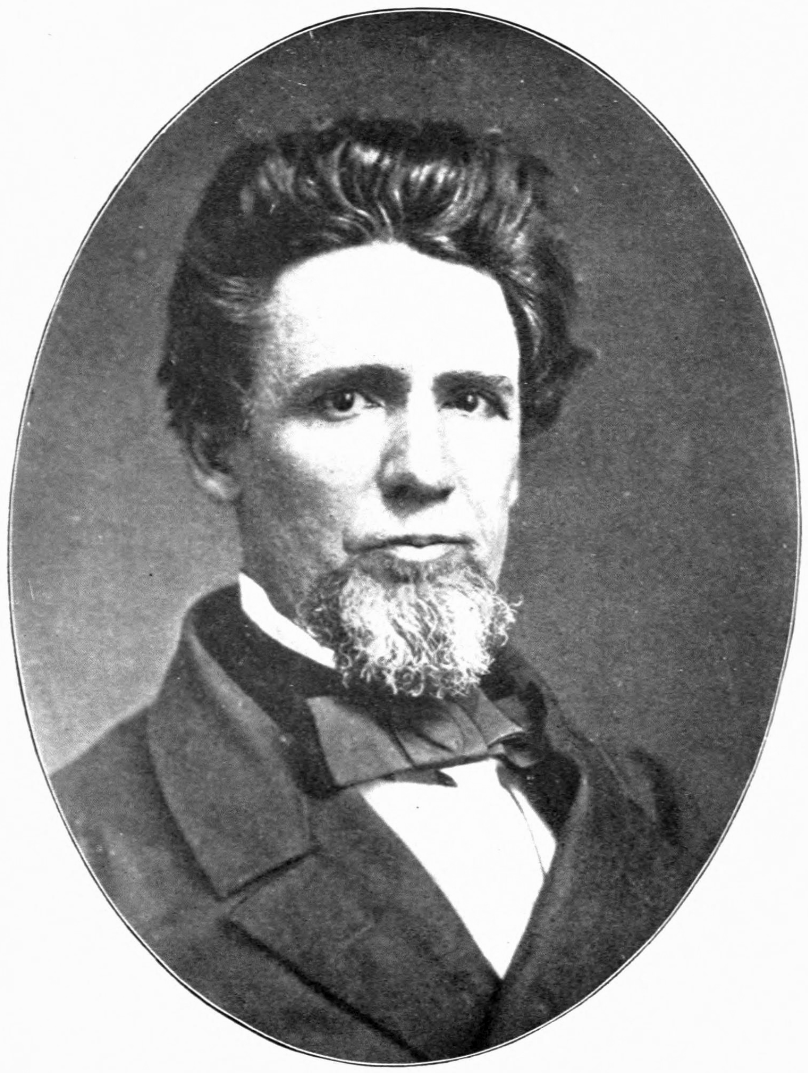

2nd President of Northwestern University
- In office 1856–1860
- Preceded by: Clark T. Hinman; Henry Sanborn Noyes (interim)
- Succeeded by: Erastus Otis Haven; David H. Wheeler (interim); Henry Sanborn Noyes (interim)

Personal details
- Born: February 22, 1820 Williamsburg, Ohio
- Died: May 1, 1903 (aged 83) Newton, Massachusetts
- Resting place: Green-Wood Cemetery
- Spouse: Sarah Miley Foster
- Parent(s): Israel Foster; Mary "Polly" Kain
- Education: Augusta College (Kentucky); Ohio Wesleyan University (honorary); Northwestern University (honorary)
- Profession: Educator

Randolph Sinks Foster (February 22, 1820 – May 1, 1903) was an American bishop of the Methodist Episcopal Church, elected in 1872.

== Early life ==
Foster was born on February 22, 1820, at Williamsburg, Ohio. He was the son of Israel Foster and Mary "Polly" Kain. His father was the youngest son of Nancy (née Trigg) Foster an dThomas Foster, an English emigrant to Virginia. His mother was the only daughter of Daniel Kain and Mary (née Hutchinson) Kain.

Foster attended Augusta College in Kentucky, but left to become a Preacher in the Ohio Conference of the Methodist Episcopal Church when he was only seventeen.

== Career ==
Foster was ordained to the Traveling Ministry by Bishops Waugh and Hedding. He went on to become the pastor of the Mulberry Street M.E. Church in New York City, where he met Daniel Drew, the financier who provided the original funding for the Drew Theological Seminary in Madison, New Jersey.

Prior to his election to the episcopacy, Foster served in pastoral appointments and in educational work. He was president of Northwestern University, Evanston, Illinois, 1857–1860. He also accepted John McClintock's invitation to become Professor of Systematic Theology at Drew. After the death of Drew's first President in 1870, Foster was elected to that post, remaining there until becoming a bishop in 1872, when he was assigned to the Cincinnati, Ohio area.

=== Works ===
Foster wrote the book Objections to Calvinism as it is: in a series of letters addressed to N.L. Rice in 1849. Also "Christian Purity or the Heritage of Faith" in 1872

== Personal life ==
In 1840, Foster was married to Sarah Ann Miley (1821–1871). Together, they were the parents of:

- Anna Florence Foster (1841–1868), who died unmarried.
- John Miley Foster (1843–1893)
- Randolph Israel Foster (1846–1881), who married Helms Pitman.
- Tallmadge W. Foster (1849–1925), who married Minnie Pritchard.
- Sarah Miley "Sallie" Foster (1854–1854)
- Elizabeth Foster (1856–1937), who married William Austin Tucker, in 1876.
- Eva Kilbreth Foster (1860–1940)

He died at Newton Centre, Massachusetts on May 1, 1903. He was buried in Green-Wood Cemetery, Brooklyn, New York.

=== Descendants ===
Through his daughter Elizabeth, he was a grandfather of Ethel (née Tucker) Bethune, Countess of Lindsay, who married Archibald Bethune, 13th Earl of Lindsay (parents of William Lindesay-Bethune, 14th Earl of Lindsay).

== See also ==
- List of bishops of the United Methodist Church

Preceded by Edward Raymond Ames	Ohio United Methodist Bishops; 1872	Succeeded by Stephen Mason Merrill
