= Stephen Mason Merrill =

American bishop

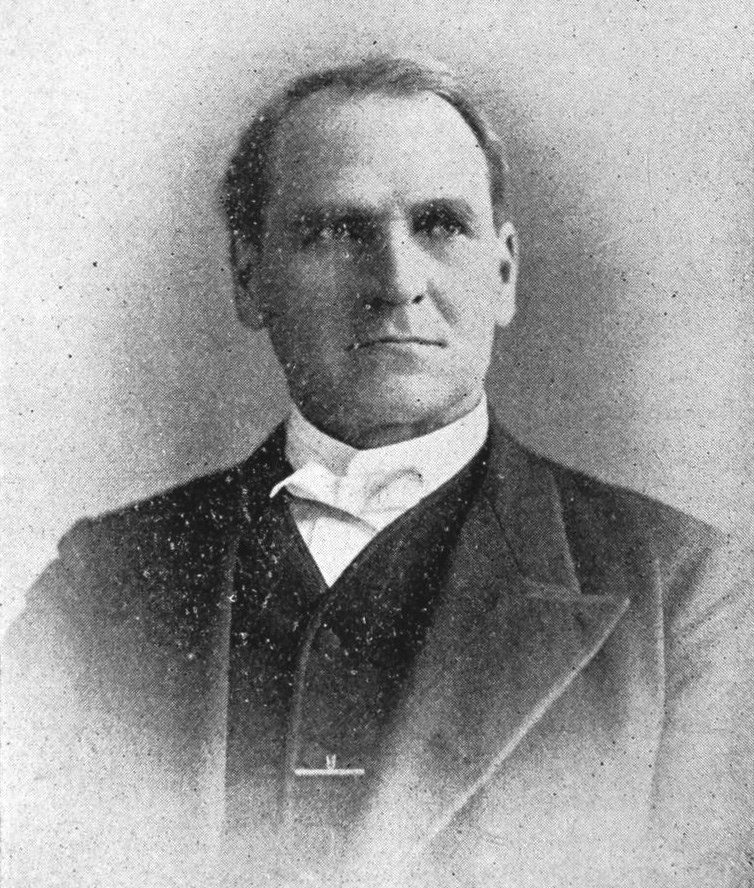

Stephen Mason Merrill (September 16, 1825 – November 12, 1905) was an American bishop of the Methodist Episcopal Church, elected in 1872.

== Early life ==
Stephen Mason Merrill was born in Mount Pleasant, Ohio on September 16, 1825. He was the fifth of eleven children and as a child the family moved to Clemont County in southwest Ohio, the birthplace of Ulysses S. Grant. It was here that he spent his growing years. While growing up, Merrill learned the trade of shoemaking and by the time he was 17 years old (1842) he had moved to Greenfield, Ohio in Highland County. It was here that he joined the local Methodist Society. The society was one of three important components of the early Methodist system. Methodism had the society, composed of all who met regularly for prayer and fellowship; the class, a dozen or so believers that met to share religious experiences; and the band, which numbered four or five persons for intimate study and conversation.

== Ordained ministry ==
Merrill was the grandson of a Minute-Man of the American Revolution. By 1845, when Merrill was 20 years old, he had been licensed to preach and was teaching school. The next year he was admitted to the Ohio Conference on trial and received the Georgetown circuit, which had 22 stops. After spending three years on the circuit Merrill married Anna Bellmire. A year after his marriage (1849) at 24 years of age, Merrill was ordained a deacon in the Methodist Episcopal Church, North (In 1844 the Methodist Episcopal Church had split along geographical lines because of slavery and slave-holding) From 1844 to 1848, Methodism declined in membership from over one million to nearly half that number and this fractured Methodism needed additional leadership. He served with distinction as a pastor and presiding elder in the Ohio Annual Conference. He was the Editor of the Western Christian Advocate (an official publication of his denomination) when elected Bishop.

== Episcopal ministry ==
By 1851 Merrill was ordained an elder. It was during this time of crisis in the Methodist movement that Merrill shown brightly. Once he was appointed to the pastorate he rose from pastor to district captain to presiding elder. By the end of the decade, at age 34, Merrill was transferred to the Kentucky Conference. He later returned to the Ohio Conference in 1863 at the age of 38.

Merrill attended his first General Conference in 1868. This national convention of the Methodist Church was strategic for Merrill as he was chosen to succeeded John M. Reid as editor of the Methodist newspaper, Western Christian Advocate, a post he held until 1872. Merrill brought more politics to the editorials of the Advocate than some of his predecessors. He openly disapproved of the candidacy of U.S. Grant for President and printed a front-page editorial denouncing the Supreme Court's decision in the case of Lambdin P. Milligan, an Indiana man arrested and tried by military officials for treason. The Milligan case revolved around the issue of civil liberties, where the Supreme Court in its ruling stated that civil liberties were guaranteed in times of war and peace and that civil courts could call to account the decisions of other tribunals. Other issues that Merrill advocated were the disenfranchisement of the former Confederates and the pursuit of holiness. Merrill, like Reid, thought that black Methodists wanted churches of their own, probably because of cruelty received from whites. Merrill, surprisingly, eventually played a role in extending fraternal relations with the Methodist Episcopal Church, South and in furthering the "Plan of Union" with his work on denominational unity, Organic Union, published in 1892. Merrill eventually left his post to assume the position of bishop. The Advocate seems to have been a proving ground for the bishopric within American Methodism.

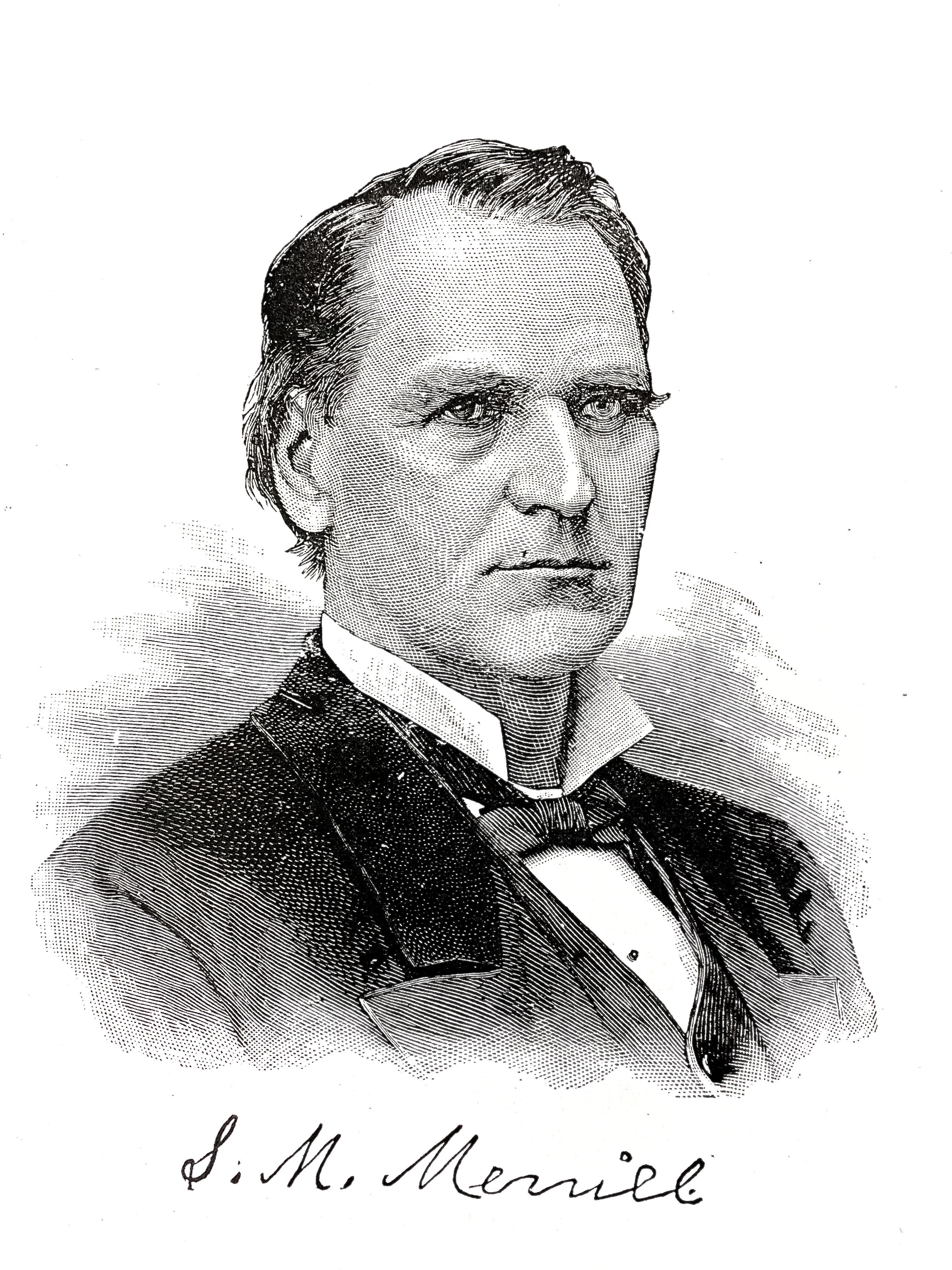

After his election as bishop, Merrill moved to St. Paul, Minnesota where he spent the next 8 years. It was during this time that Merrill began to expand his writing career. The books that he authored during this time were of a theological nature. In 1876 his Christian Baptism was published. 1878 saw his work The New Testament Idea of Hell published which was followed by The Second Coming of Christ in 1879 and Aspects of Christian Experience in 1882. These theological works had been preceded by two other works, Recollections of a Superannuate (1857), a book edited by Merrill and An Oral Discussion of Justification (1858). The writings that followed this period were focused on issues of ecclesiology and polity. This change corresponds to his movement from Minnesota to the thriving metropolis of Chicago in 1880. His most significant works were A Digest of Methodist Law (1885) and The Doctrines and Disciplines of the Methodist Episcopal Church (1888). His time in Chicago brought more involvement in the administration and government of his denomination. It was said that Merrill’s knowledge of Methodist Law was encyclopedic and was seconded only by that of Joshua Soule, a prolific author and leader in early American Methodism. Soule was the author of earlier versions of The Doctrines and Disciplines of the Methodist Episcopal Church.

Additional writings that Merrill published were also of a religious nature, either devotional or theological. In 1886 he published Outline Thoughts on Probation. Mary of Nazareth and Her Family was released in 1895 and followed by The Crisis of This World in 1896. In 1899 Merrill published a work of family history titled Joshua Merrill and Family: a family record. This diversion was ended with three other books before his death. After the turn of the century, Merrill wrote Sanctification and Atonement in 1901. 1902 saw the publication of Discourses on Miracles.

Merill was elected to the episcopacy the same year as another Ohio-born M.E. Bishop, Randolph Sinks Foster. Bishop Merrill became an acknowledged authority on Methodist law.

== Death ==
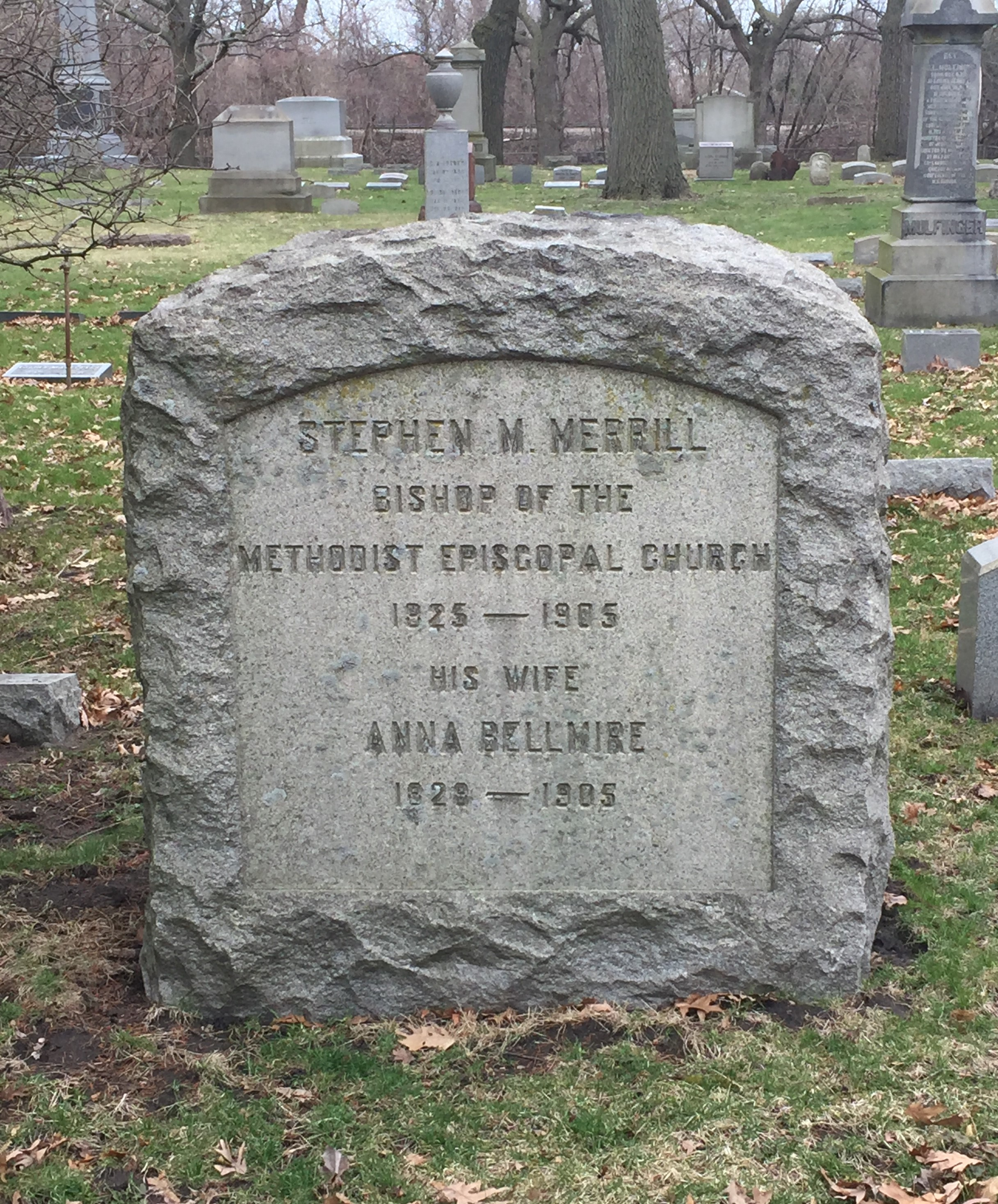

As his life slowed and neared its end Merrill sought to retire. At the age of 79 he requested and received retirement. This retirement brought needed rest. Merrill died in Keyport, New Jersey on November 12, 1905. He is buried in Rosehill Cemetery in Chicago.

== See also ==
- List of bishops of the United Methodist Church

Cook, R. J. "Bishop Stephen Mason Merrill, D.D., LL.D.," Methodist Review, vol. 23 (May 1907). pp. 345–359. Merrill, S. M. "To the General Conferences." Journal of the 24th Delegated General Council. 1904. pp. 191–193.
