= Tucker Anthony =

Former investment banking and brokerage firm based in Boston, Massachusetts

- Type: Acquired
- Industry: Financial services
- Founded: 1892; 134 years ago
- Founder: William Austin Tucker; S. Reed Anthony
- Fate: Acquired by Royal Bank of Canada
- Successor: RBC Dain Rauscher (2000-2008)
- Headquarters: Boston, Massachusetts
- Products: Brokerage, Investment banking
- Total assets: $48 billion
- Subsidiaries: Sutro & Co. R.L. Day & Co. Cleary Gull & Co. Branch Cabell

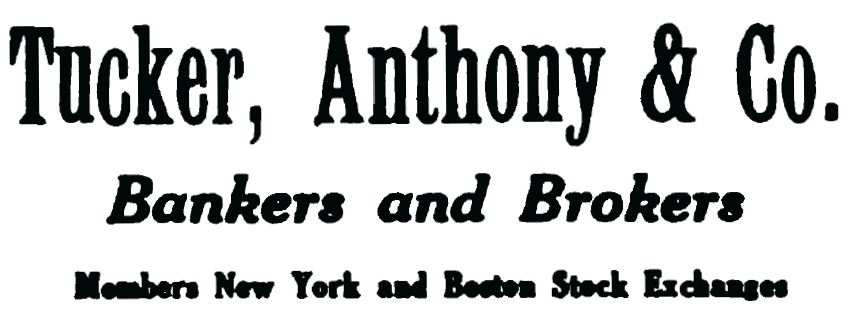
Tucker, Anthony & Company logo c. 1910

Tucker Anthony was an independent investment banking and brokerage firm based in Boston, Massachusetts. In 2001, the firm was acquired by Royal Bank of Canada and was then merged with the bank's Dain Rauscher Wessels subsidiary to create RBC Dain Rauscher.

== Overview ==
At the time of its acquisition, Tucker Anthony was 14th largest brokerage firm in the U.S. with 990 account executives working from more than 80 offices across the country. The firm had a particular presence in the Northeast and Mid-Atlantic including New York, Massachusetts, Pennsylvania and Virginia as well as a strong presence in California.

== History ==
The firm was founded in 1892 as Tucker & Anthony Bankers by William Austin Tucker and S. Reed Anthony with offices at 50 State Street. Other early partners included Phillip L. Saltonstall, Nathan Anthony and Chauncey Eldridge.

In 1942, the firm merged with Burr, Gannett & Co., an old Boston-based firm. In 1956, Tucker Anthony merged with R.L. Day & Co.

In 1982, the firm was acquired by John Hancock Financial. During its ownership by John Hancock, the firm was operated as a division of John Hancock Freedom Securities Corporation, a holding company that also owned Sutro & Company, a San-Francisco investment management and brokerage firm founded in 1858.

In 1996, the management of the firm led a leveraged buyout of what was then known as Tucker Anthony Sutro from John Hancock with the support of the private equity firm Thomas H. Lee Partners. In 1998, Tucker Anthony completed a $120 million IPO, going public on the New York Stock Exchange.

In 2001, after operating as an independent firm for five years, the firm was acquired sold to the Royal Bank of Canada and merged with the Canadian bank's recently acquired subsidiary Dain Rauscher Wessels.

Tucker Anthony was the predecessor of TA Associates, the private equity firm which was established in 1968 and spun-out in 1978.
