= Charles A. Goodrich =

American author and Congregational minister

The Reverend Charles A. Goodrich
- Born: Charles Augustus Goodrich; 1790
- Died: June 4, 1862 (aged 71–72)
- Occupation: Author

Reverend Charles Augustus Goodrich (1790 – June 4, 1862) was an American writer and Congregational minister, who popularized the motto "a place for everything and everything in its place". His uncle was Chauncey Goodrich; his siblings included a brother Samuel Griswold Goodrich, and a sister, Abigail Goodrich Whittlesey.

== Life and works ==
Goodrich graduated from Yale University in 1812, studied theology and was ordained in 1816 and became pastor of the 1st Congregational Church in Worcester, Massachusetts. In 1820 he moved to Berlin, Connecticut, and in 1848 to Hartford, where he held a pastorate. He was also a member of the Connecticut Senate. Goodrich was associated with his brother Samuel (who published as Peter Parley) in writing books for the young. He was the author of several books: View of Religions (1829); Lives of the Signers of the Declaration of independence (1829); History of the United States of America (1822); Family Tourist (1848); Family Sabbath-Day Miscellany (1855); Geography of the Chief Places mentioned in the Bible (1855); Greek Grammar (1855); Child's History of the United States (1855); Bible History of Prayer (1855); Great Events of American History; Outlines of Geography; and Universal Traveller.

== Epigram ==
Goodrich is known for having the first printed citation of the epigram: "Have a place for every thing, and keep every thing in its proper place. The phrase was published in an article called "Neatness" which Goodrich published in The Ohio Repository (Canton, Ohio), in December 1827. The idea that everything should have a place, and that everything should be returned to this place subsequently appeared in later texts:

- In 1841 the phrase was used in a modified version in an item headed "Brother Jonathan's Wife's Advice to her Daughter on her Marriage", in the Hagerstown Mail, Maryland: "A place for everything and everything in time are good family mottos."
- In Masterman Ready, or the Wreck of the Pacific, in 1842, Frederick Marryat wrote, "In a well-conducted man-of-war every thing is in its place, and there is a place for every thing."
- It appears also in a book printed in 1857 by D. Appleton & Co. of New York with the same title: A Place for Everything and Everything In Its Place".

== Honors and memberships ==
Elected a member of the American Antiquarian Society in 1820.
