= Abigail Goodrich Whittelsey =

American businessman

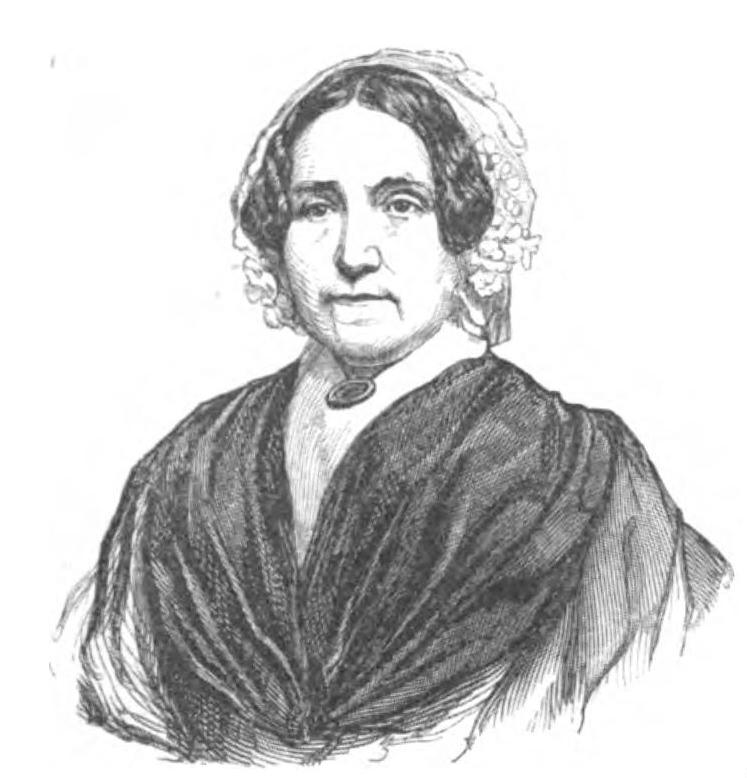
- Born: November 29, 1788; Ridgefield
- Died: July 16, 1858 (aged 69)
- Occupation: Magazine editor
- Relatives: Samuel Griswold Goodrich, Charles A. Goodrich

Abigail Goodrich Whittelsey (née, Goodrich; married surname, Whittelsey, and sometimes spelled Whittlesey; November 29, 1788 – July 16, 1858) was an American educator, magazine founder, and editor from Connecticut. A teacher and a matron at a female seminary in her early career, she helped to establish a female seminary in Utica, New York. Whittelsey was actively involved with the Maternal Association. She also founded two periodicals, Mother’s Magazine and Mrs. Whittelsey’s Magazine for Mothers.

== Early life and education ==
Abigail Goodrich was born in Ridgefield, Connecticut, the daughter of Samuel and Elizabeth Ely Goodrich. She was the elder sister of Samuel Griswold Goodrich. She was also sister to Charles A. Goodrich who became a Congregational minister. Her father served as pastor over the Congregational Church. The family removed to Berlin, Connecticut, where Whittlesey was chiefly educated.

== Career ==
In 1808, she married Rev. Samuel Whittlesey, a Congregational minister, who served at New Preston, Connecticut for a decade, beginning in 1807. After Mr. Whittlesey, at his own request, received a dismission from his pastoral position at New Preston, he took charge of the "Deaf and Dumb Asylum", at Hartford, Connecticut, on April 30, 1817.

They lived from 1824 till 1828 in Canandaigua, New York, where Abigail worked as matron of the Ontario Female Seminary, managed by her husband, the principal. In 1828, they moved to Utica, New York to establish their own girls’ seminary. There, she saw the necessity for the development of female character and influence.

In January 1833, in Utica, she founded Mother's Magazine, which was affiliated with the Maternal Association, and published by her husband. She moved it to New York City in December of that year, after the Whittelseys moved there, with Abigail continuing as the editor. Through Whittlesey's influence and correspondence, the Maternal Associations grew in number in the United States, in Europe, and other areas. The magazine reached a circulation of 10,000 in 1837. Her husband died in 1842 and Abigail was assisted by Reverend Darius Mead, her brother-in-law, who was an editor of Christian Parlor Magazine. After Mother's Magazine was merged with the rival Mother's Journal and Family Visitant in 1848, Abigail resigned. In 1850, aided by her son, Henry, she launched Mrs. Whittelsey’s Magazine for Mothers which she kept up for two years. This magazine was limited to language of theology.

== Personal life and death ==
The Whittleseys had seven children. Abigail Whittelsey died in Colchester, Connecticut, on July 16, 1858.
