= Knickerbocker Trust Company =

Bank based in New York City (1884–1912)

Knickerbocker Trust
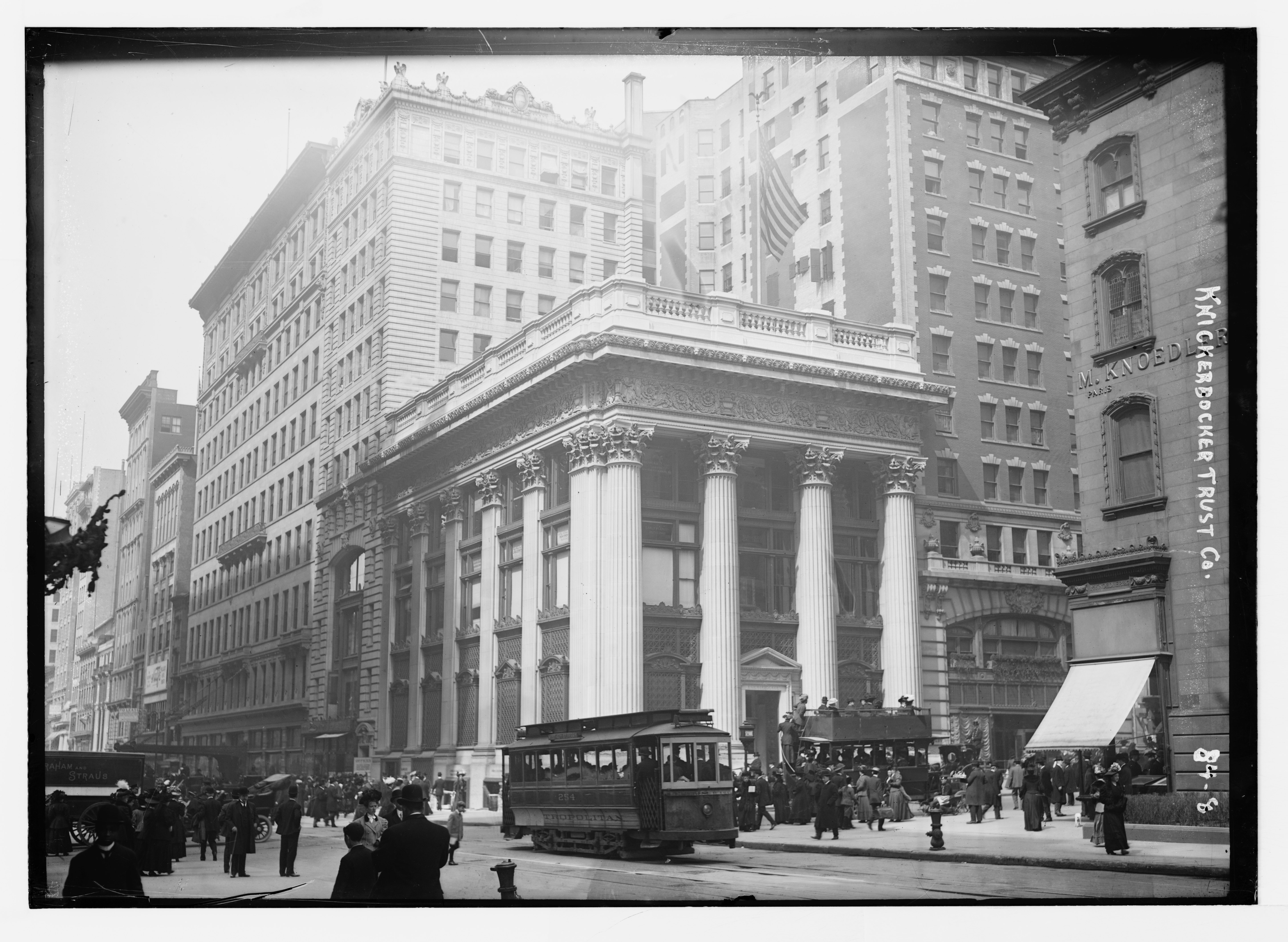
- Industry: Investment banking
- Founded: 1884
- Defunct: 1912
- Fate: Acquired
- Successor: Bank of New York
- Headquarters: New York City, United States
- Key people: Frederick G. Eldridge; John P. Townsend; Charles T. Barney; Charles H. Keep

The Knickerbocker Trust was a bank based in New York City that was, at one time, among the largest banks in the United States. It was a central player in the Panic of 1907.

== History ==
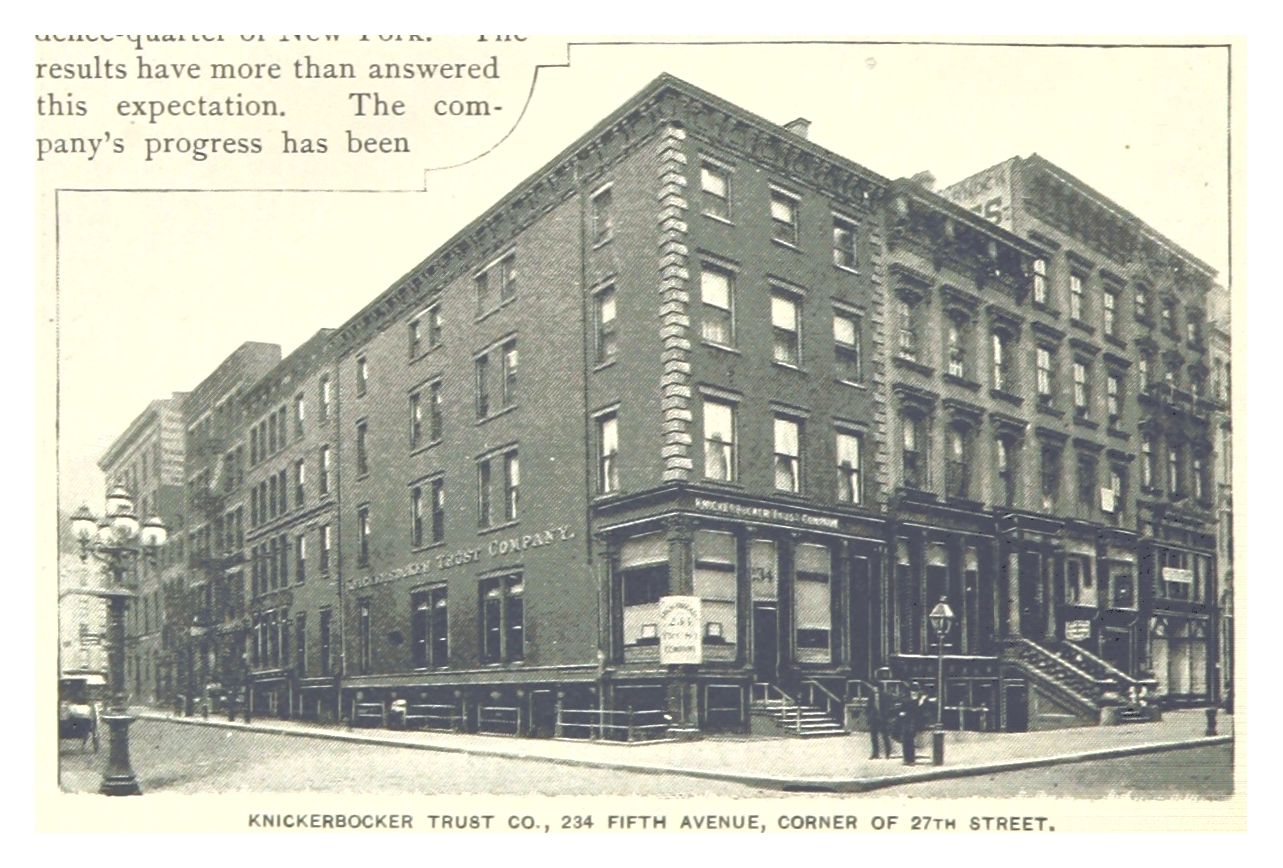
The original Knickerbocker Trust office, 1893.

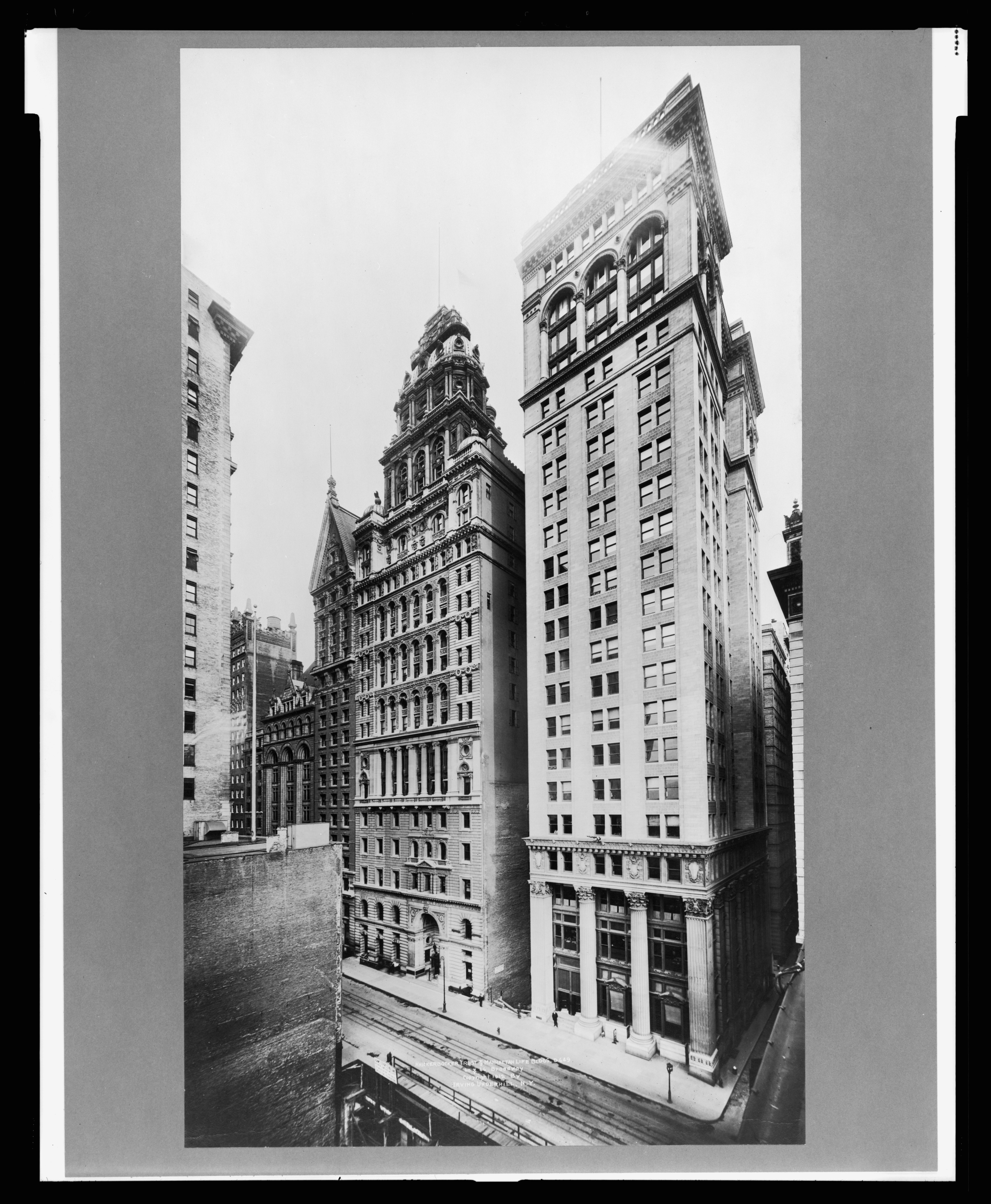
Knickerbocker Trust (right, built 1909) and Manhattan Life Bldgs., 60 & 66 Broadway

The bank was chartered in 1884 by Frederick G. Eldridge, a friend and classmate of financier J.P. Morgan. As a trust company, its main business was serving as trustee for individuals, corporations and estates. Eldridge was the founding president serving until his death in 1889. Eldridge was succeeded by John P. Townsend, who served as president for five years until he resigned to become president of the Bowery Savings Bank. After Townsend's resignation, Robert Maclay was unanimously chosen to be the new president, with Charles Tracy Barney as vice president. When Maclay retired in 1897, Barney was elected president.

=== Panic of 1907 ===
In 1907, its funds were being used by then-president Charles T. Barney in a plan to drive up the cost of copper by cornering the market. This gamble came undone due to the dumping of millions of dollars in copper into the market to stop a hostile takeover in an unrelated organization. Barney requested a meeting with J.P. Morgan to discuss financial assistance for the bank, but was rejected. The board of Knickerbocker Trust asked Barney to resign after he admitted involvement in the F. Augustus Heinze and Charles W. Morse speculations.

That afternoon, the National Bank of Commerce announced it would no longer clear checks for the Knickerbocker, triggering a run of depositors demanding their funds back that forced the Knickerbocker to suspend operations. George L. Rives, Henry C. Ide and Ernst Thalmann were named receivers. The failure of the Knickerbocker was the impetus for the Panic of 1907, and exacerbated an ongoing decline in the stock market that saw the Dow Jones Industrial Average lose 48% of its value from January 1906 to November 1907. The banking crisis is also seen as the final event that led Congress to form the Federal Reserve System in 1913.

A. Foster Higgins of Greenwich, Connecticut, served as successor president of Knickerbocker (Barney shot himself on November 14, 1907). Higgins was 77 years old and quite garrulous. Foster made public statements, including one following the death of Barney, that greatly embarrassed the Rehabilitation Committee under F.G. Bourne and William A. Tucker that was trying to get the trust company on its feet again. Nevertheless, the company reopened some weeks after its forced closing and paid off all depositors in full with interest.

In March 1908, Charles H. Keep became president of the Knickerbocker Trust. He had previously served as Assistant Secretary of the Treasury from 1903 to 1907 under Secretary L. M. Shaw during President Theodore Roosevelt's administration followed by his appointment as New York State Superintendent of Banks. He served in that role for less than a year until he was appointed to the New York Public Service Commission, from which he resigned in 1908 to become president of the Knickerbocker.

=== Mergers and acquisitions ===
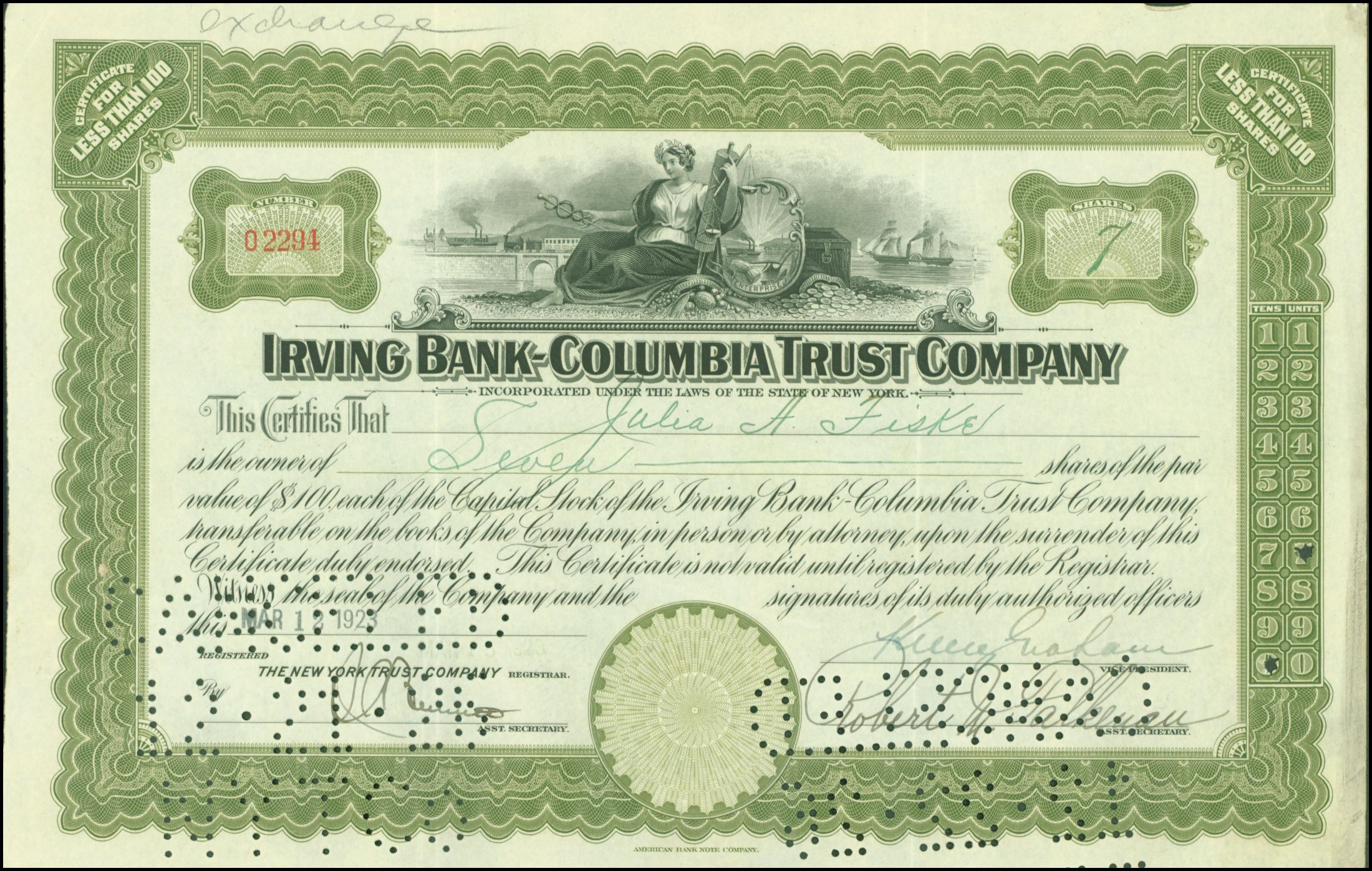
Share of the Irving Bank-Columbia Trust Company, issued 12 March 1923

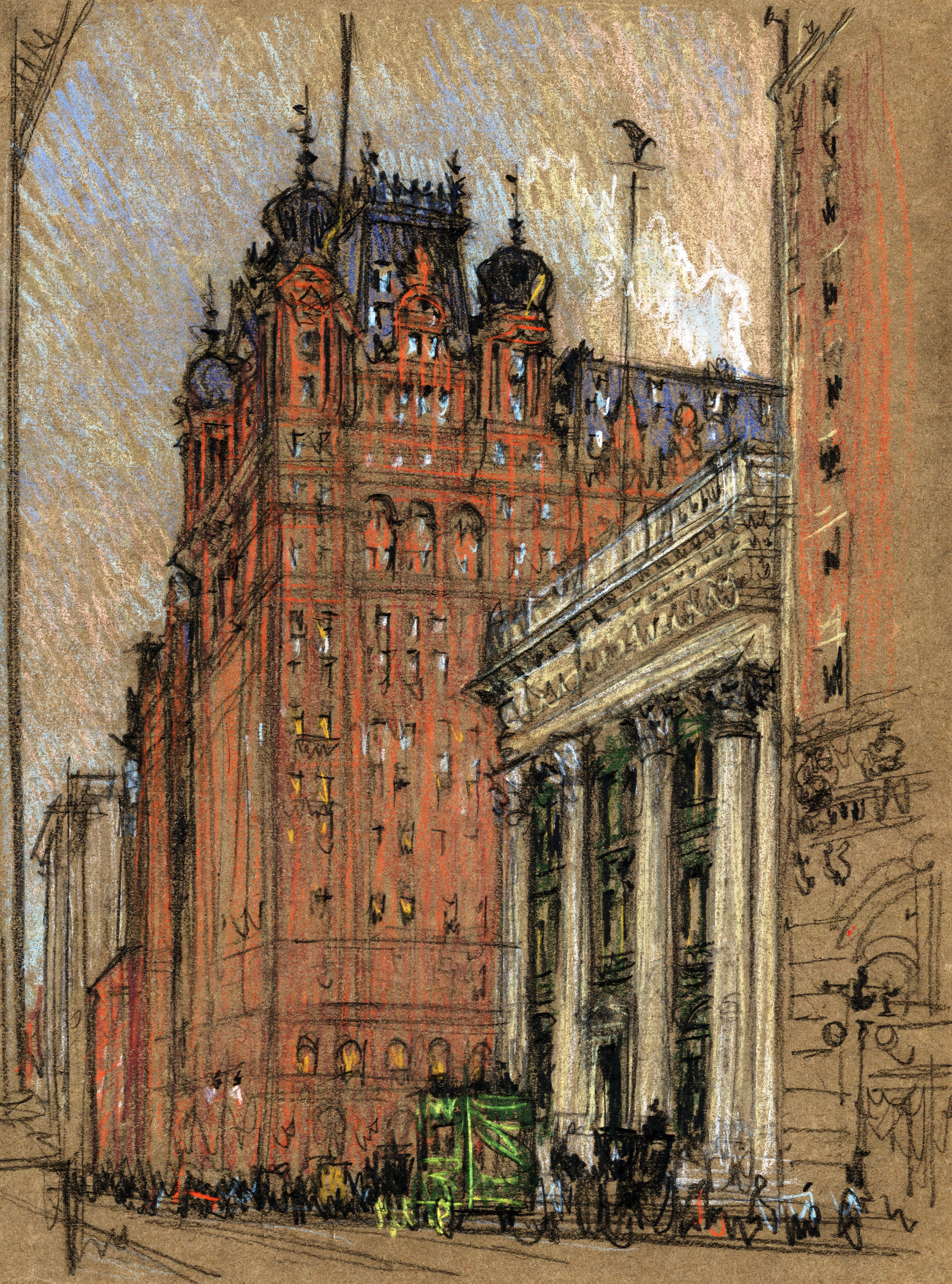
The Knickerbocker Trust and The Waldorf-Astoria Hotel, charcoal and pastel on brown paper by Joseph Pennell, ca. 1904–1908

In February 1903, Knickerbocker Trust acquired the Washington Bank, afterwards opening a branch in the seven-story Smith Building at 148th Street and Third Avenue in the Bronx Financial District. In November 1912, the company bought its Bronx branch building, which was considered the Bronx's first skyscraper when it was built in 1900.

In 1912, its assets were acquired by the Columbia Trust Company, forming the Columbia-Knickerbocker Trust Company. One of the principal shareholders of the Columbia was Hetty Green and her son, Ned Green, was a director. At the time, Columbia had deposits of more than $21,000,000 and Knickerbocker had deposits of approximately $38,000,000. Columbia's president, Willard V. King, (Note: The directors of the Columbia Trust at the time of merger were: Edward Howland Robinson Green, John D. Barrett, Samuel G. Bayne, Union N. Bethel, Robert S. Bradley, Harold B. Clark, F. H. Eaton, James M. Gifford, Henry Goldman, William N. Harte, A. Barton Hepburn, Willard V. King, G. H. Kinnicut A. R. Kuser, C. F. Mathewson, J. R. McGinley, W. H. Nichols, A. G. Paine, C. W. Seamans, Hermann Selcken, Frederick Strauss, Arthur Turnbull, M. M. Van Beuren, and F. W. White.) served as president of the new company and Knickerbocker's president, Charles H. Keep, (Note: The directors of the Knickerbocker Trust at the time of merger were: Benjamin L. Allen, Gideon Louis Boissevain, Frederick Gilbert Bourne, Franklin Quimby Brown, Edward H. Clark, Lewis L. Clarke, H. Rieman Duval, J. Horace Harding, Charles F. Hoffman, William B. Joyce, Charles H. Keep, Samuel T. Peters, William Austin Tucker, and Payne Whitney.) became chairman of the board. It was said that one of the deciding factors with the Columbia interests was Knickerbocker's hold on the uptown field. Columbia Trust had no branches and had outgrown its headquarters at 135 Broadway.

In 1914, the name was changed back to Columbia Trust Company before it was acquired by merger by the Irving Bank of New York (which had been founded in New York in 1851) in February 1923. After the merger, it was called the Irving Bank-Columbia Trust Company. In September 1926, the company was renamed Irving Bank and Trust Company before it acquired the American Exchange-Pacific Bank after which it was renamed the American Exchange Irving Trust Company. In 1929, the name was changed again to the Irving Trust Company.

On October 7, 1988, the Irving Trust board signed an agreement to merge with Bank of New York ending a yearlong battle as Bank of New York engineered a hostile takeover. At the time of the merger the combined banks became the United States' 12th largest bank with asset of $42 billion. During that year Irving had been trying to participate in a friendly merger with Banca Commerciale Italiana.

== Knickerbocker Trust Building ==
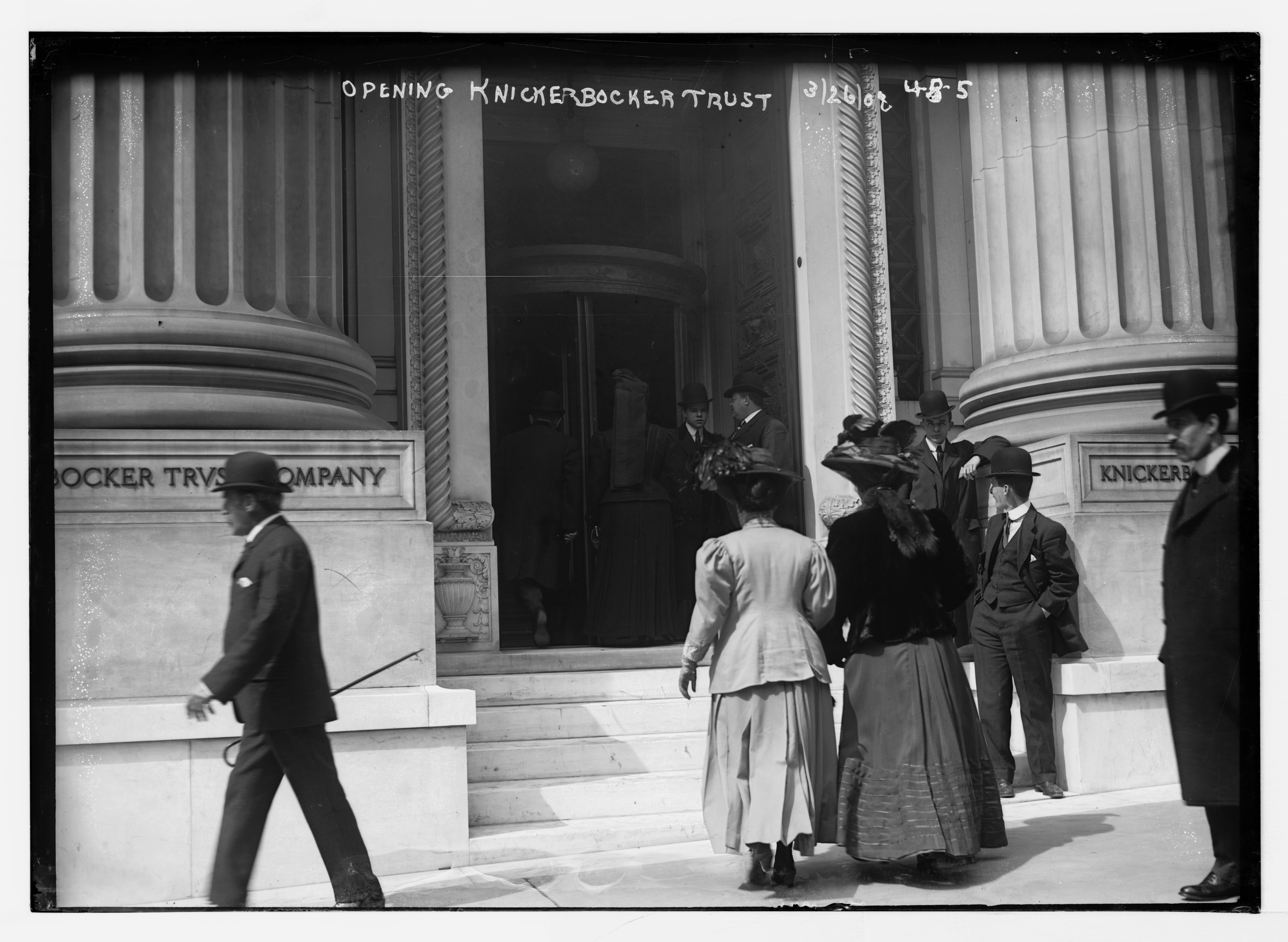
The opening of the Knickerbocker Trust office at the northwest corner of 34th Street and Fifth Avenue

The New York City bank was housed in a Roman-style temple designed by McKim, Mead, and White and erected between 1902 and 1904 (illustrated) at the northwest corner of 34th Street and Fifth Avenue. Stanford White's design allowed for the possibility of adding nine stories of offices upon the structure. It had branch offices at 60 Broadway, in Harlem and The Bronx.

The Stanford White building was enlarged by ten stories in 1921, and the façade completely redesigned in 1958, with its signature pilasters covered over; it still remains, its original form unrecognizable.

== Presidents of Knickerbocker Trust ==
- 1884–1889: Frederick G. Eldridge
- 1889–1894: John P. Townsend
- 1894–1897: Robert Maclay
- 1897–1907: Charles T. Barney
- 1907–1908: A. Foster Higgins
- 1908–1912: Charles H. Keep
