= Samuel Griswold Goodrich =

American author

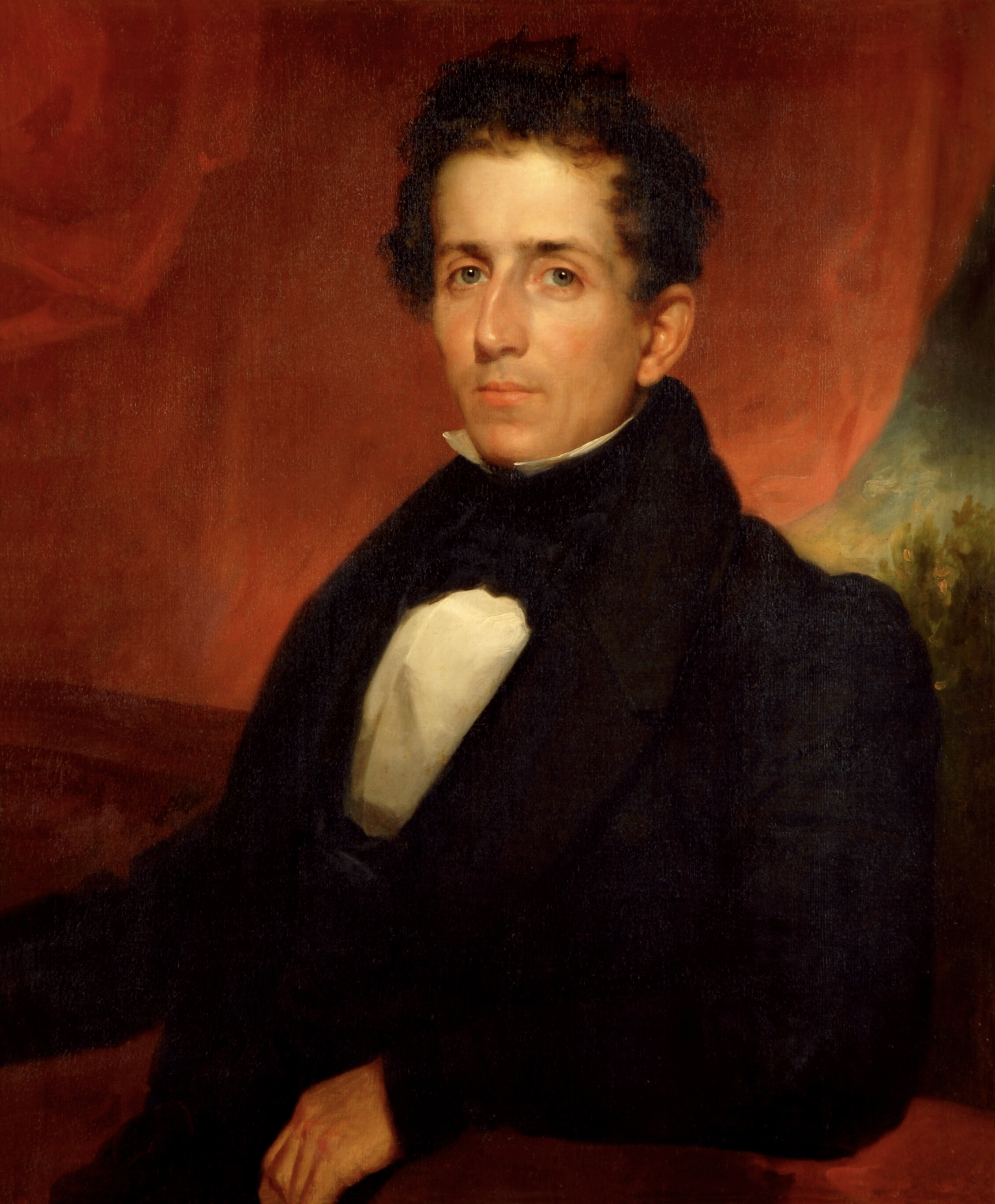
- Portrait by Rembrandt Peale, c. 1820–1830

Member of the Massachusetts State Senate
- In office 1837–1837

Member of the Massachusetts House of Representatives
- In office 1836–1836

Personal details
- Born: August 19, 1793 Ridgefield, Connecticut, US
- Died: May 9, 1860 (aged 66) New York City, US
- Relatives: Charles A. Goodrich (brother); Abigail Goodrich Whittlesey (sister); Emily Goodrich Smith (daughter)

Samuel Griswold Goodrich (August 19, 1793 – May 9, 1860), better known by his pseudonym Peter Parley, was an American author and politician who established the children's magazine Merry's Museum. He was a Massachusetts State Senator in 1837.

== Biography ==
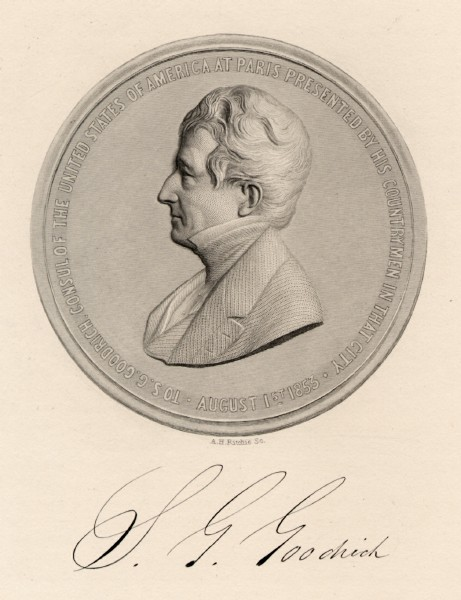
Commemorative medal given to Goodrich for his work as the American consul in Paris

Goodrich was born at Ridgefield, Connecticut, the son of a Congregational minister. Goodrich was largely self-educated, and became an assistant in a country store at Danbury, Connecticut, which he left in 1808, and later again at Hartford, Connecticut, until 1811. From 1816 to 1822 he was a bookseller and publisher in Hartford. He visited Europe from 1823 to 1824, and moved to Boston in 1826. In 1833 he bought 45 acres (180,000 m^{2}) in nearby Roxbury and built a home in what is now Jamaica Plain. There he continued in the publishing business, and from 1828 to 1842 published an illustrated annual, The Token, to which he was a frequent contributor both in prose and verse. A selection from these contributions was published in 1841 under the title Sketches from a Students Window. The Token also contained some of the earliest work of Nathaniel Hawthorne, Nathaniel Parker Willis, Henry Wadsworth Longfellow and Lydia Maria Child. In 1841 he established Merry's Museum, which he continued to edit till 1854.

Goodrich and his brother Charles wrote books for young people. His series, beginning in 1827 under the name of Peter Parley, embraced geography, biography, history, science and miscellaneous tales. Of these he was the sole author of only a few, but in 1857 he wrote that he was the author and editor of about 170 volumes, and that about seven millions had been sold. An English writer, George Mogridge, also used the name Peter Parley, raising objections from Goodrich, who had the prior claim.

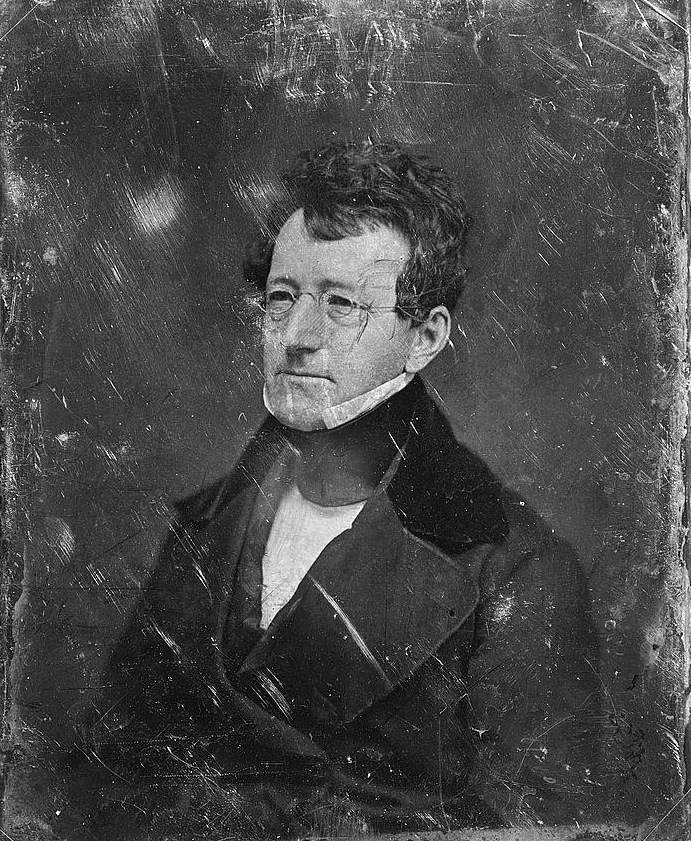
Photograph of Goodrich, c. 1844–1860

In 1857 he published Recollections of a Lifetime, which contains a list both of the works of which he was the author or editor and of the spurious works published under his name. By his writings and publications he amassed a large fortune. He was active in Whig politics, and was elected a member of the Massachusetts House of Representatives in 1836, and of the state Senate in 1837, his competitor in the last election being Alexander Hill Everett, and in 1851-1853 he was consul at Paris, where he remained until 1855, taking advantage of his stay to have several of his works translated into French. At the end of his consulship, he was presented with a commemorative medal.

He returned to the United States, and, in 1859, he published Illustrated Natural History of the Animal Kingdom. He died in New York and was buried in Southbury, Connecticut where he lived for a short time. His funeral was widely attended by a vast concourse of persons. Two hundred Sunday School children headed the procession to the cemetery.

== Legacy ==
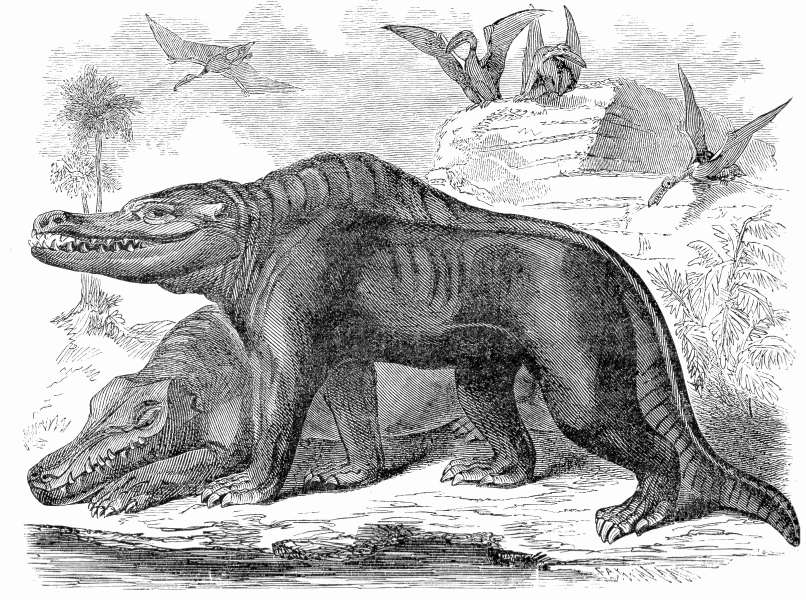
Reconstruction of Megalosaurus by Samuel Griswold Goodrich from Illustrated Natural History of the Animal Kingdom

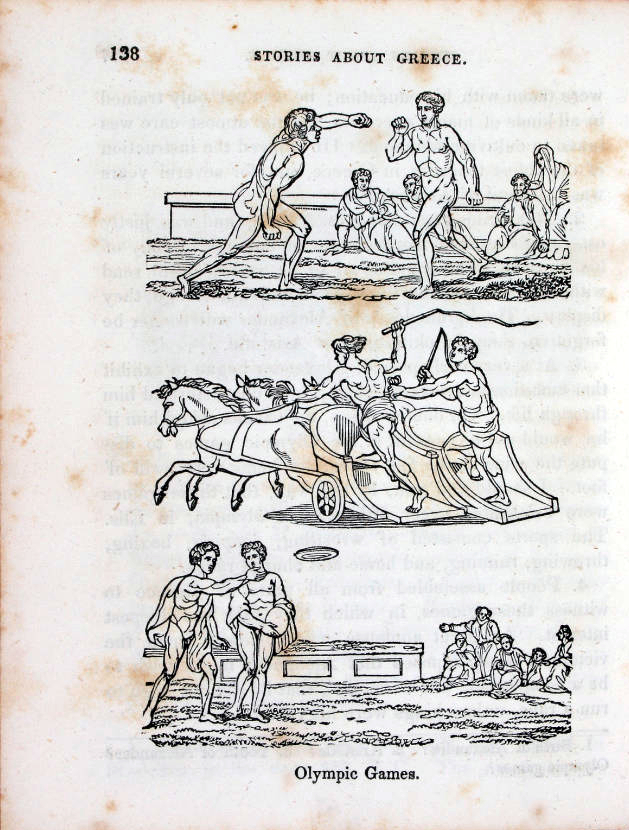
An engraving illustrating the Olympic games from Peter Parley's tales about ancient and modern Greece

- Goodrich's land in Jamaica Plain was subdivided into residential streets, among them Peter Parley Road, Parley Avenue and Parley Vale.
- There is a street called Peter Parley Row in Berlin, CT, presumably honoring the author's Connecticut birthplace.
- There are three streets bearing his name in Ridgefield, CT, Parley Road, Parley Lane, and Peter Parley Lane.
- James Joyce mentions the name of Peter Parley in his novel A Portrait of the Artist as a Young Man at the end of chapter I.
- One room Schoolhouse in Ridgefield, CT, was named after Peter Parley.
- George du Maurier mentions "Peter Parleys Natural History" in his first novel "Peter Ibbetson" (Part One).
- Emily Dickinson mentions "Peter Parley" in two of her poems: ("Hurrah for Peter Parley! / Hurrah for Daniel Boone! / Three cheers, sir, for the gentleman / Who first observed the moon!" and "Rather - Heaven's 'Peter Parley'! / By which Children slow / To sublimer Recitation / Are prepared to go!")
- James Abbott McNeill Whistler refers dismissively to Peter Parley in his book The Gentle Art of Making Enemies.
