= David Lindesay-Bethune, 15th Earl of Lindsay =

British noble (1926–1989)

The Right Honourable The Earl of Lindsay

Personal details
- Born: 9 February 1926 London, England
- Died: 1 October 1989 (aged 63) Congleton, Cheshire, England
- Spouses: The Hon. Mary-Clare Douglas-Scott-Montagu (m. 1953; div. 1968) Penelope Crossley (m. 1969)
- Parent(s): William Lindesay-Bethune, 14th Earl of Lindsay; Marjory Cross
- Education: Eton College
- Alma mater: Magdalene College, Cambridge
- Awards: Honorary rank of colonel

Military service
- Allegiance: United Kingdom
- Branch/service: British Army
- Rank: Major
- Unit: Scots Guards, Fife and Forfar Yeomanry/Scottish Horse

David Lindesay-Bethune, 15th Earl of Lindsay (9 February 1926 – 1 October 1989), styled Viscount Garnock between 1943 and 1985, was a British soldier.

== Early life ==
Lindsay was the son of William Lindesay-Bethune, 14th Earl of Lindsay and Marjory Cross. Among his younger siblings were Hon. John Martin Lindesay-Bethune (who married Enriqueta Mary Jeanne Koch de Gooreynd and Jean Maxwell Brickman), Lady Elizabeth Marjory Beatrice Lindesay-Bethune (who married Maj. David Laurence Greenacre), and Lady Mary Bethune Lindesay-Bethune (who married Capt. Owen Buckingham Varney).

His paternal grandparents were Archibald Bethune, 13th Earl of Lindsay and Ethel Tucker (the daughter of William Austin Tucker). His maternal grandparents were Arthur John Graham Cross and Marjory Nelson Ritchie Edwards.

He was educated at Eton and Magdalene College, Cambridge.

== Career ==
He served in the Scots Guards as a junior officer and left with the rank of Major in 1951.

He was appointed Honorary Colonel on 29 May 1957 of the Fife and Forfar Yeomanry/Scottish Horse. He held this post until 1962, when his tenure expired. He was however allowed to retain the honorary rank of Colonel.

His interest in steam railways led to his acquiring the locomotive The Great Marquess from British Railways following its withdrawal in 1962. He succeeded Sir Gerald Nabarro as chairman of the Severn Valley Railway in 1973.

=== Views on curtsying ===
He was known as a vocal proponent of traditional British protocol. He gained publicity in 1971 when he sent Martha Mitchell, wife of US Attorney General John Mitchell, some critical correspondence after Mrs. Mitchell declined to curtsy to Queen Elizabeth II.

== Personal life ==
On 31 October 1953, Lord Lindsay married the Honourable Mary-Clare Douglas-Scott-Montagu, daughter of John Douglas-Scott-Montagu, 2nd Baron Montagu of Beaulieu and Alice Pearl Crake. Before their divorce in 1968, they had one son and one daughter:

- James Randolph Lindesay-Bethune, 16th Earl of Lindsay (1955−2026), who married Diana Mary Chamberlayne-Macdonald, daughter of Maj. Nigel Donald Peter Chamberlayne-Macdonald and Penelope Mary Alexandra Chamberlayne, in 1982.
- Lady Caroline Janet Lindesay-Bethune (b. 1957), who married Sir George Wrey, 15th Baronet, son of Sir Castel Wrey, 14th Baronet and Sybil Mabel Alice Lubke, in 1981.

He married as his second wife Penelope Crossley, daughter of Anthony Crossley and Clare Frances Fortescue Thomson, in 1969.

Lord Lindsay died in 1989 and was succeeded by his only son, James.

== Arms ==
Coat of arms of David Lindesay-Bethune, 15th Earl of Lindsay
Coronet The coronet of an Earl Crest A swan with wings expanded proper. Escutcheon Quarterly, 1st & 4th: Gules, a fess chequy Azure and Argent, in chief three mullets of the second(Lindsay); 2nd & 3rd: counter-quartered, 1st & 4th: Azure, a fess between three lozenges Or (Bethune); 2nd & 3rd: Argent, on a chevron Sable, an otter's head erased of the first (Balfour) all within a bordure embattled Or. Supporters On both dexter and sinister, a griffin Gules, armed and legged Or Motto Above the crest: Je ayme (French: "I love"); Below shield: "Live but Dreid"

== Sources ==
- Burke's Peerage, Baronetage & Knightage, 107th Edition, edited by Charles Mosley, Wilmington, Delaware, 2003, vol II, pp. 2342–45; ISBN 0-9711966-2-1

Military offices
Preceded by Colonel Robert Appleby Bartram MC TD	Honorary Colonel of the Fife and Forfar Yeomanry/Scottish Horse; 1957-1962	Succeeded by Colonel Robert Appleby Bartram MC TD
Peerage of Scotland
Preceded by William Lindesay-Bethune	Earl of Lindsay; 1985–1989	Succeeded by James Lindesay-Bethune
