= Reginald Lindesay-Bethune, 12th Earl of Lindsay =

Scottish representative peer (1867–1939)

The Right Honourable The Earl of Lindsay JP DL
- The Earl of Lindsay in 1933
- Born: Reginald Bethune Lindesay; 18 May 1867
- Died: 14 January 1939 (aged 71)
- Spouse: Beatrice Mary Shaw (m. 1892; died 1939)
- Parent(s): David Bethune, 11th Earl of Lindsay; Emily Marian Crosse
- Relatives: Archibald Bethune, 13th Earl of Lindsay (brother)

Reginald Lindesay-Bethune, 12th Earl of Lindsay JP DL (18 May 1867 – 14 January 1939), known as Viscount Garnock from 1894 to 1917, was a Scottish nobleman and British Army officer.

== Early life ==
The eldest son of David Clarke Bethune, 11th Earl of Lindsay (1832–1917) and Emily Marian Crosse, he succeeded his father as the 12th Earl of Lindsay upon his death in 1917, and assumed the additional surname of Lindesay in 1918.

== Career ==
Lord Garnock was commissioned a second lieutenant in the 8th Hussars on 16 November 1887, promoted to lieutenant on 5 June 1889, and to captain on 30 July 1894. He served with the regiment in South Africa in 1901–1902 during the Second Boer War, and was promoted major on 19 October 1901. The war ended in June 1902, and Lord Garnock stayed in South Africa until December that year, when he left on the SS Kinfauns Castle. He retired from the 8th Hussars after his return, on 11 February 1903, and later served with the East Riding of Yorkshire Yeomanry.

Lord Garnock was unsuccessful Conservative parliamentary candidate for Buckrose, East Yorkshire, in 1906. He was a Scottish representative peer in the House of Lords from 1917. He was also Master of Fife Fox Hounds.

== Personal life ==
Garnock married Beatrice Mary Shaw, daughter of John Shaw of Welburn Hall, Yorkshire, but had no issue.

Upon his death on 14 January 1939, he was succeeded by his younger brother, Archibald Lionel Bethune. His widow, the dowager Lady Lindsay, died on 9 November 1944.

== Arms ==
Coat of arms of Reginald Lindesay-Bethune, 12th Earl of Lindsay
Coronet The coronet of an Earl Crest A swan with wings expanded proper. Escutcheon Quarterly, 1st & 4th: Gules, a fess chequy Azure and Argent, in chief three mullets of the second(Lindsay); 2nd & 3rd: counter-quartered, 1st & 4th: Azure, a fess between three lozenges Or (Bethune); 2nd & 3rd: Argent, on a chevron Sable, an otter's head erased of the first (Balfour) all within a bordure embattled Or. Supporters On both dexter and sinister, a griffin Gules, armed and legged Or Motto Above the crest: Je ayme (French: "I love"); Below shield: "Live but Dreid"

Peerage of Scotland
Preceded by David Clarke Bethune	Earl of Lindsay; 1917–1939	Succeeded by Archibald Lionel Bethune
