= Charles Manners, Marquess of Granby =

British aristocrat born 1999

Charles Manners Marquess of Granby
- Born: Charles John Montague Manners; 3 July 1999 (age 27); Nottingham, England
- Education: Newcastle University
- Occupation: Business manager
- Parents: David Manners, 11th Duke of Rutland (father); Emma Watkins (mother)
- Relatives: Lady Violet Manners (sister); Lady Alice Manners (sister); Lady Eliza Manners (sister); Lord Hugo Manners (brother); Charles Manners, 10th Duke of Rutland (paternal grandfather); Frances Manners, Duchess of Rutland (paternal grandmother)

Charles John Montague Manners, Marquess of Granby (born 3 July 1999) is a British aristocrat who is the fourth child and elder son of David Manners, 11th Duke of Rutland, and Emma Manners, Duchess of Rutland.

== Biography ==
Charles Manners is a member of the Manners family, which holds the family seat at Belvoir Castle in Leicestershire, known for its use as a filming location in the Netflix series The Crown. He studied business management at Newcastle University.

He grew up at Belvoir Castle with his older sisters (Lady Violet, Lady Alice, and Lady Eliza), as well as his younger brother, Lord Hugo. At his sister Lady Alice's 18th birthday celebration in 2013, Charles and his brother arrived on camels.

It was reported in 2022 that Charles was working at an insurance company in the City.

Upon the death in early 2024 of his grandmother Frances Manners, Duchess of Rutland, he was bequeathed the vast majority of her estate, which was to be held in a trust.

In April 2024, he hosted the annual Belvoir Boxing Ball in support of the mental health charity James' Place. In addition to his fundraising efforts, he plays the guitar and participates in shooting activities. It was previously reported that he was in a relationship with the model Ella Ross, but they are no longer together.

In November 2024, he and his siblings – among other individuals, including members of the aristocracy – took part in a demonstration in London opposing proposed changes to inheritance tax. The event involved a march on Whitehall in support of British farmers. Other participants included Stella Boden and Viscount Garnock. Protesters expressed concern that the proposed tax reforms could negatively affect the future of family-run farms and rural estates.

In 2025, he attended a launch event hosted by Alice Chawner at Stanley's for her toffee vodka. The event featured a 1980s ski-themed aesthetic and was attended by various members of young London society, including his brother, Lord Hugo.

As of 2025, Charles is 26 years old and currently not publicly known to be in a relationship. He resides in Fulham in South West London and participates in cycling.

== Succession ==
As his father's eldest son, he stands to inherit the dukedom of Rutland and the family seat of Belvoir Castle, along with its 16,000 acres of farmland, with his mother, the Duchess, having expressed support for the tradition of male primogeniture. She has indicated that Charles is the one she believes is best suited to take on the responsibilities of managing the title and estate.
