= Violet Lindesay-Bethune, Countess of Lindsay =

British socialite (born 1993)

The Right Honourable The Countess of Lindsay
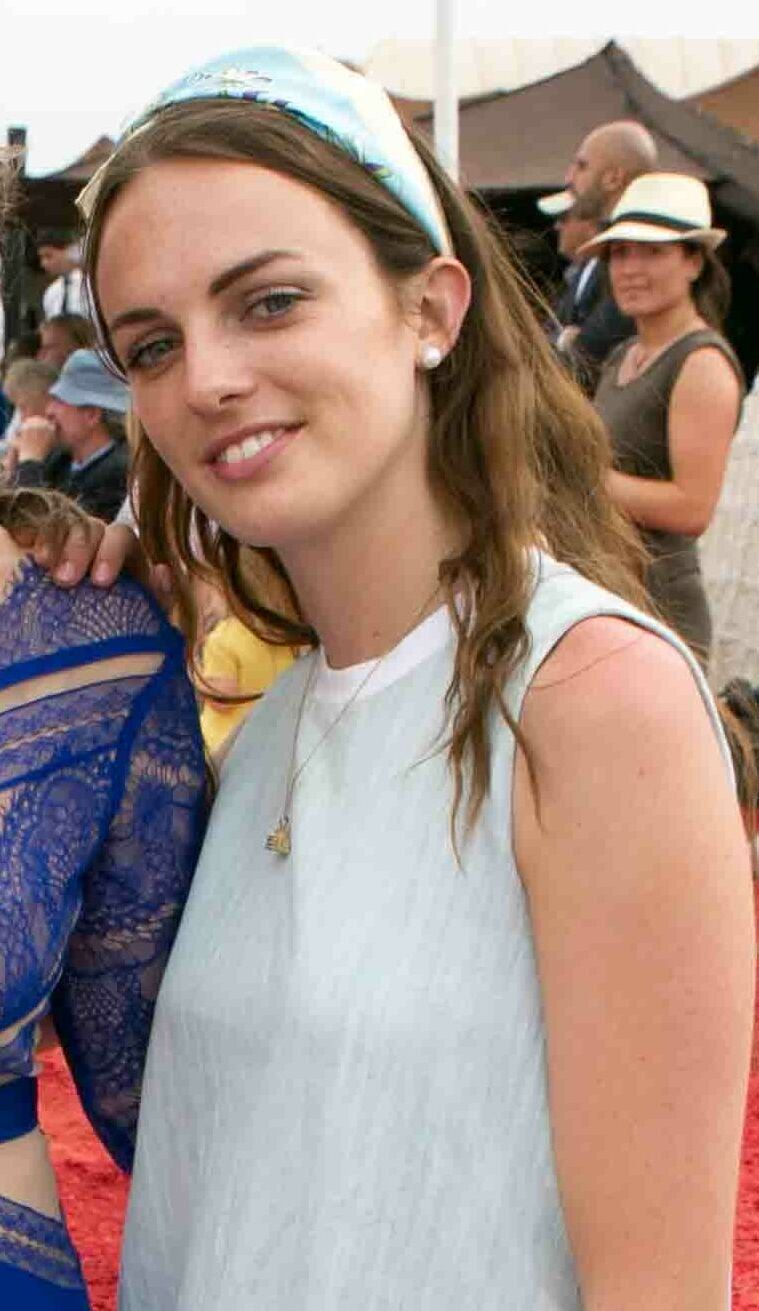
- Manners at British Polo Day Morocco 2014
- Born: Violet Diana Louise Manners; 18 August 1993 (age 33); Nottingham, England
- Education: Queen Margaret's School, York
- Occupations: Model; businesswoman
- Spouse: William Lindesay-Bethune, 17th Earl of Lindsay (m. 2025)
- Children: 1
- Parents: David Manners, 11th Duke of Rutland (father); Emma Watkins (mother)
- Relatives: Lady Alice Manners (sister); Lady Eliza Manners (sister); Charles Manners, Marquess of Granby (brother); Lord Hugo Manners (brother); Charles Manners, 10th Duke of Rutland (paternal grandfather); Frances Manners, Duchess of Rutland (paternal grandmother)

Violet Diana Louise Lindesay-Bethune, Countess of Lindsay (née Lady Violet Manners; 18 August 1993) is a British socialite, businesswoman, and model. She began her career in fashion modelling for Tatler and Dolce & Gabbana. She then went into historic preservation and heritage, co-producing the podcast Duchess with her mother, Emma Manners, Duchess of Rutland, and organizing overnight stays at her family home, Belvoir Castle, as part of a curated English Heritage tour.

She is the founder and CEO of HeritageXplore, a digital listings and ticketing platform for independently owned historic castles, palaces, and country houses in the United Kingdom. She is married to William Lindesay-Bethune, 17th Earl of Lindsay, the son of James Lindesay-Bethune, 16th Earl of Lindsay.

== Early life ==
Born in Nottingham, she is the eldest child of David Manners, 11th Duke of Rutland, and Emma Manners, Duchess of Rutland. She has two younger sisters, Lady Alice and Lady Eliza, and two younger brothers, Charles Manners, Marquess of Granby, and Lord Hugo Manners.

She was raised at Belvoir Castle, the official residence of her family, having moved there in 2000 with her siblings following the death of her grandfather, the 10th Duke of Rutland.

Manners studied at Queen Margaret's School, York.

== Education and career ==
Along with her sisters, Lady Alice and Lady Eliza, Lady Violet is known for her activities within the London social scene. She and her sisters have received national press for their outlandish behaviour, being dubbed the "bad-Manners girls." She has worked as a model, having been featured in Tatler and walking the runway for Dolce & Gabbana.

She worked for My Beautiful City, a creative agency in Soho, before starting her own marketing and brand-strategy consultant company. She also has worked for Robin Birley, in public relations for Gleneagles, and a geopolitical consultant firm called Etoile.

In 2021, Manners was leading a creative marketing agency called Akana Collective.

She is credited by her mother, Emma Manners, with inspiring Duchess, the podcast launched in 2021 which ran for four seasons. The idea for the podcast originated during her time studying for a business and finance diploma at UCLA in Los Angeles. Inspired by observing American perceptions of the British aristocracy, she proposed the concept to her mother, the Duchess of Rutland, aiming to present a more authentic account of life in historic estates from the perspective of those who manage them in the 21st century. In preparation, she explored over fifty historic houses.

In 2021, Manners proposed the idea of offering overnight stays at Belvoir Castle as part of a curated heritage tour. The initiative was inspired by feedback from a listener of the Duchess podcast, which she co-produced. Responding to interest in visiting the historic estates featured in the series, Manners developed the concept to provide guests with a structured experience of British country houses, including Belvoir Castle.

In 2024, she launched HeritageXplore, a digital listings and ticketing platform focused on independently owned historic castles, palaces, and manor houses in the United Kingdom. She serves as the platform's founder and CEO, with the aim of supporting public engagement with the country's heritage sites.

In 2023, Manners announced her candidacy for the National Trust's advisory council. Motivated by concerns over what she viewed as the politicisation of the organisation, she aimed to contribute to its strategic direction and governance.

== Personal life ==
In 2015, Manners and her sisters received complaints from neighbours about noise from parties at their Fulham home. One neighbour contacted the Duke of Rutland and the council, and police were reportedly called on one occasion. She later referenced the complaints on social media.

In November 2024, Manners participated in a demonstration in London, alongside her siblings and other individuals, including members of the aristocracy, opposing proposed changes to inheritance tax. The event included a march on Whitehall in support of British farmers that voiced concerns that the proposed reforms could impact the viability of family-run farms and rural estates. In December, the same year, she attended the annual Claridge's Christmas Tree unveiling in Mayfair. The event was also attended by Olivia Buckingham, Lady Victoria Hervey, Alice Naylor-Leyland, and Emma, Marchioness of Bath.

=== Marriage ===
Manners met then-William, Viscount Garnock in late 2023, at his family home in Scotland.

In July 2024, after six months of long-distance dating, her engagement to William, Viscount Garnock, son and heir of James Lindesay-Bethune, 16th Earl of Lindsay, was announced. It was reported that the ceremony would happen at Belvoir Castle and would be a private event, not open to the public.

On 21 June 2025, she married Viscount Garnock at Belvoir Castle, in a wedding attended by several members of the British aristocracy. They were married at the church of St Mary the Virgin, Bottesford, Leicestershire. The bride wore a couture gown by Phillipa Lepley inspired by the design of a gown worn by Manners great-grandmother, Margaret, Duchess of Argyll, and the historic Rutland tiara, an item passed down through the family since the 18th century.

Upon marriage, she was styled Viscountess Garnock by courtesy until her husband succeeded to his father's titles in 2026, thus making Manners the Countess of Lindsay.

In March 2026, the couple announced that they are expecting their first child. Their son John Reggie James Lindesay-Bethune, Viscount Garnock, was born 4 July 2026.
