= Duchess of Rutland =

Duchess of Rutland is a title given to the wife of the Duke of Rutland, an extant title in the Peerage of England which was created in 1703. The family seat is Belvoir Castle in Leicestershire. Emma Manners is the current Duchess, and she is also the CEO of Belvoir Castle.

== Duchesses of Rutland ==
#	Portrait	Name	Birth	Marriage	Became Duchess of Rutland	Spouse	Ceased being Duchess of Rutland	Death	Reason ceased being Duchess
1		Catherine Noel	10 August 1657	8 January 1673	29 March 1703	John Manners, 1st Duke of Rutland	10 January 1711	24 January 1733	Husband's death
2		Catherine Russell	23 August 1676	23 August 1693	10 January 1711	John Manners, 2nd Duke of Rutland	30 October 1711		Died
3		Lucy Sherard	1685	1 January 1713		John Manners, 2nd Duke of Rutland	22 February 1721	27 October 1751	Husband's death
4		Bridget Sutton	30 November 1699	27 August 1717	22 February 1721	John Manners, 3rd Duke of Rutland	16 June 1734		Died
5		Mary Somerset	1 August 1756	26 December 1775	29 May 1779	Charles Manners, 4th Duke of Rutland	24 October 1787	2 September 1831	Husband's death
6		Elizabeth Howard	13 November 1780	22 April 1799	24 October 1787	John Manners, 5th Duke of Rutland	29 November 1825		Died
7		Janetta Hughan	8 September 1836	15 May 1862	3 March 1888	John Manners, 7th Duke of Rutland	11 July 1899		Died
8		Marion Lindsay	7 March 1856	25 November 1882	4 August 1906	Henry Manners, 8th Duke of Rutland	8 May 1925	22 December 1937	Husband's death
9		Kathleen Tennant	30 January 1894	27 January 1916		John Manners, 9th Duke of Rutland	4 December 1989		Died
10		Anne Cumming-Bell	1924	27 April 1946		Charles Manners, 10th Duke of Rutland	1956	27 December 2002	Divorce
11		Frances Sweeny	19 June 1937	15 May 1958		Charles Manners, 10th Duke of Rutland	2 January 1999	21 January 2024	Husband's death
12		Emma Watkins	2 September 1963	6 June 1992	4 January 1999	David Manners, 11th Duke of Rutland	Incumbent		

== Wives who did not become Duchess of Rutland ==
- Catherine Louisa Georgina Marley, who married John (later the 7th Duke), did not become Duchess as she died in 1854 and her husband only became the Duke in 1888.

== Ships ==
Two ships have been named Duchess of Rutland:

- Duchess of Rutland (1786 ship)
- Duchess of Rutland (1799 ship)
