= Lady Edward Manners =

British aristocrat and businesswoman

- Born: Gabrielle Elizabeth Frances Ross; 1975 (age 49–50)
- Education: Durham University
- Occupation(s): businesswoman, fashion designer
- Spouse: Lord Edward Manners (m. 2013)
- Children: 2
- Parent(s): Peter F. Ross; Marianne M. Alexander
- Family: Manners family (by marriage)

Gabrielle Elizabeth Frances Ross, known upon her marriage as Lady Edward Manners, (born 1975) is a British businesswoman, fashion designer, and aristocrat. She is the second wife of Lord Edward Manners, a younger son of Charles Manners, 10th Duke of Rutland. Lady Edward is the founder of Beau Bra, a lingerie company based in London, and the châtelaine of Haddon Hall, the former seat of the Dukes of Rutland.

== Biography ==
Lady Edward was born Gabrielle Elizabeth Frances Ross in 1975. She is the daughter of Peter F. Ross and Marianna M. Alexander. She studied archeology at Durham University. She later attended law school.

She is the founder of Beau Bra, a lingerie company headquartered in London. She began designing bras while a law student, and her work was discovered by an editor at Vogue. She set up an exclusive deal to sell at Selfridges. Lady Edward ran the company for eleven years, and had dealings with manufacturers and operated a small factory unit in Wirksworth. She later sold the company to Slimma PLC.

In 2013 she married Lord Edward Manners, a younger son of Charles Manners, 10th Duke of Rutland and Frances Helen Sweeny. She is the second wife of Lord Edward, who is also the brother of David Manners, 11th Duke of Rutland. On 20 November 2013, she gave birth to twin boys, Alfred Charles Nicholas Manners and Vesey Peter Michael Manners.

She and her husband live at Haddon Hall, a country house in Derbyshire that was the family seat of the Dukes of Rutland prior to Belvoir Castle. They are the first members of the Manners family to live at Haddon Hall since 1700. As the châtelaine of Haddon Hall, she opened up the house as a wedding venue and tourism destintation. She also manages the estate's Edwardian cutting garden.
