= Otis Ferry =

British model and fox hunting enthusiast

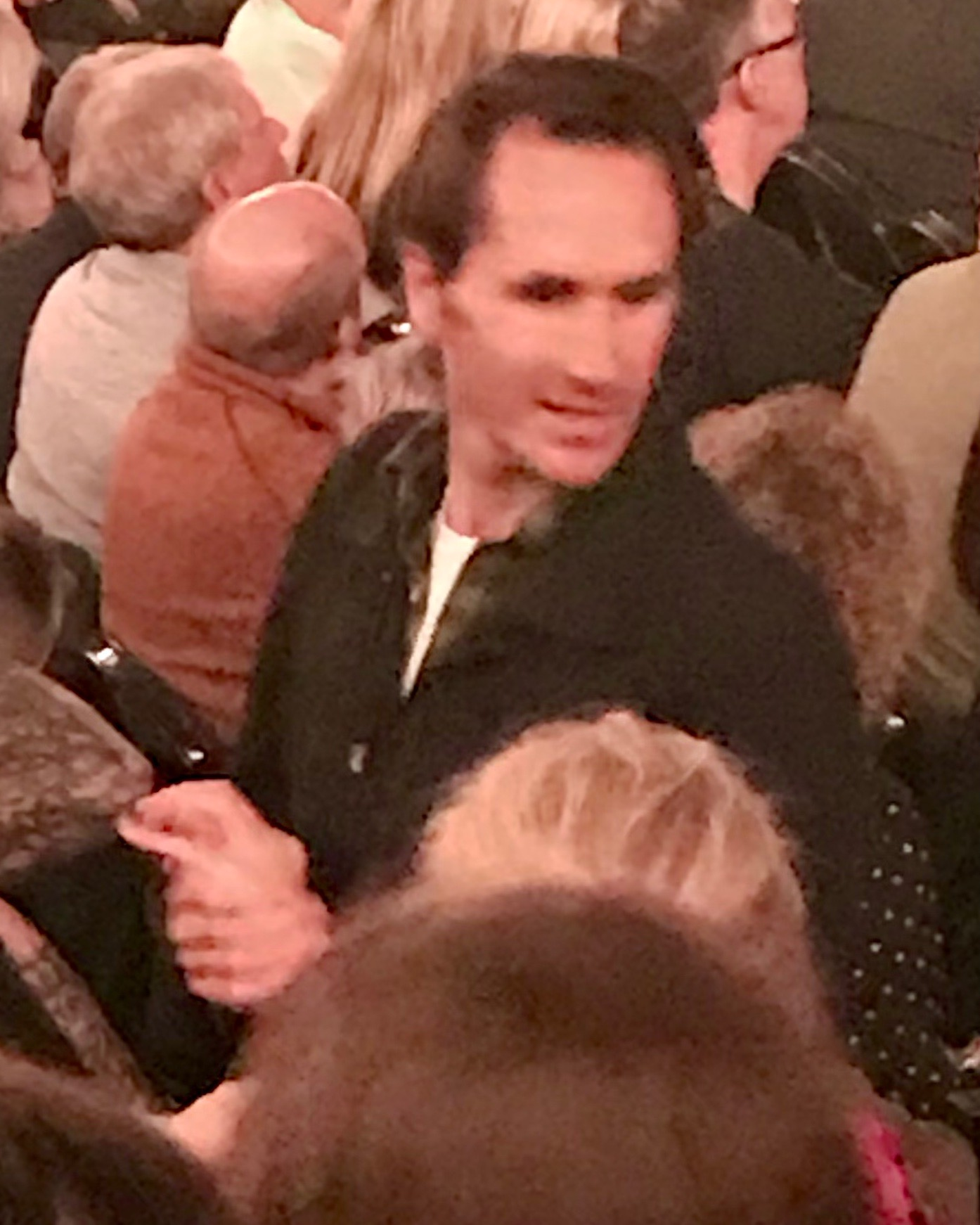
- Ferry in with the crowd at a Roxy Music concert at the Manchester Arena in 2022
- Born: Charles Frederick Otis Ferry; 1 November 1982 (age 43)
- Occupations: Model; fox hunter
- Known for: Prominent pro-fox hunting enthusiast

Charles Frederick Otis Ferry (born 1 November 1982) is a British model and pro-fox hunting enthusiast. The son of singer-songwriter Bryan Ferry, he has served as joint master of the South Shropshire hunt.

He has been arrested and charged several times for activities relating to hunting, only one of which led to a conviction.

== Early life ==
The son of Bryan Ferry, the lead vocalist of the rock band Roxy Music, and his then wife, model and socialite Lucy Ferry (née Helmore), Ferry was educated at Marlborough College.

Ferry was introduced to fox-hunting at the age of fifteen by Rory Knight Bruce, a field sports journalist, and soon developed a passion for it. Ferry's mother had begun fox-hunting at the age of twelve.

== Career ==
In 2004, Tatler magazine put Ferry at number 2 in its list of the 200 "most desirable" men. In 2007, he was modelling for Burberry.

On 15 September 2004, Ferry and seven other pro-hunting protesters entered chamber of the House of Commons in protest at anti-hunting legislation. After a short adjournment, the House then went on to approve the Hunting Bill by a majority of 356 to 166. All eight men were charged with offences under the Public Order Act 1986 and denied the charges, but they were later convicted, and each was fined £350 and given an 18-month conditional discharge.

In accepting a lifetime achievement award at the Q Awards of 2004, Bryan Ferry said he was dedicating it to his brave son.

On 20 June 2005, Ferry appeared as a member of the BBC Television Question Time panel, together with Tony Benn, Justine Greening, Lembit Opik, and June Sarpong. By then he was widely seen as the public face of the pro-hunting campaign.

In 2007, Ferry became huntsman and joint master of the South Shropshire Hunt. At the age of 25, he was believed to be the youngest master of foxhounds in three hundred years.

On 21 November 2007, after an incident with hunt protestors during a meet of the Heythrop Hunt at Lower Swell, Ferry was arrested on suspicion of common assault and robbery. It was alleged that he had taken a video camera from two hunt saboteurs who said they were investigating possible breaches of the Hunting Act 2004. He was subsequently arrested on suspicion of perverting the course of justice in connection with the common assault charge. Although he was initially granted bail, he was subsequently remanded in custody until shortly before the trial in 2009 when he was released on bail. At that point, he had spent four months in prison. The Crown Prosecution Service subsequently decided not to proceed with the charges of perverting the course of justice, and Ferry was formally acquitted of them in April 2009. In May 2009 he was convicted on a lesser charge of "causing fear and stress".

Speaking about his time in prison, Ferry claimed he had been imprisoned for his beliefs. He later added "It was a doddle compared to public school".

In the run-up to the British general election of 2015, Ferry headed Vote-OK, a campaign group which offered to supply canvassers for Conservative candidates who would support a repeal of the Hunting Act 2004.

== Personal life ==
In 2020, Ferry was reported to be the long-term partner of Lady Alice Manners, the second daughter of the 11th Duke of Rutland, and to be living with her at Belvoir Castle in Leicestershire. In 2022 it was reported they had ended their relationship.
