= Emma Manners, Duchess of Rutland =

British noblewoman and podcaster (born 1963)

Her Grace The Duchess of Rutland
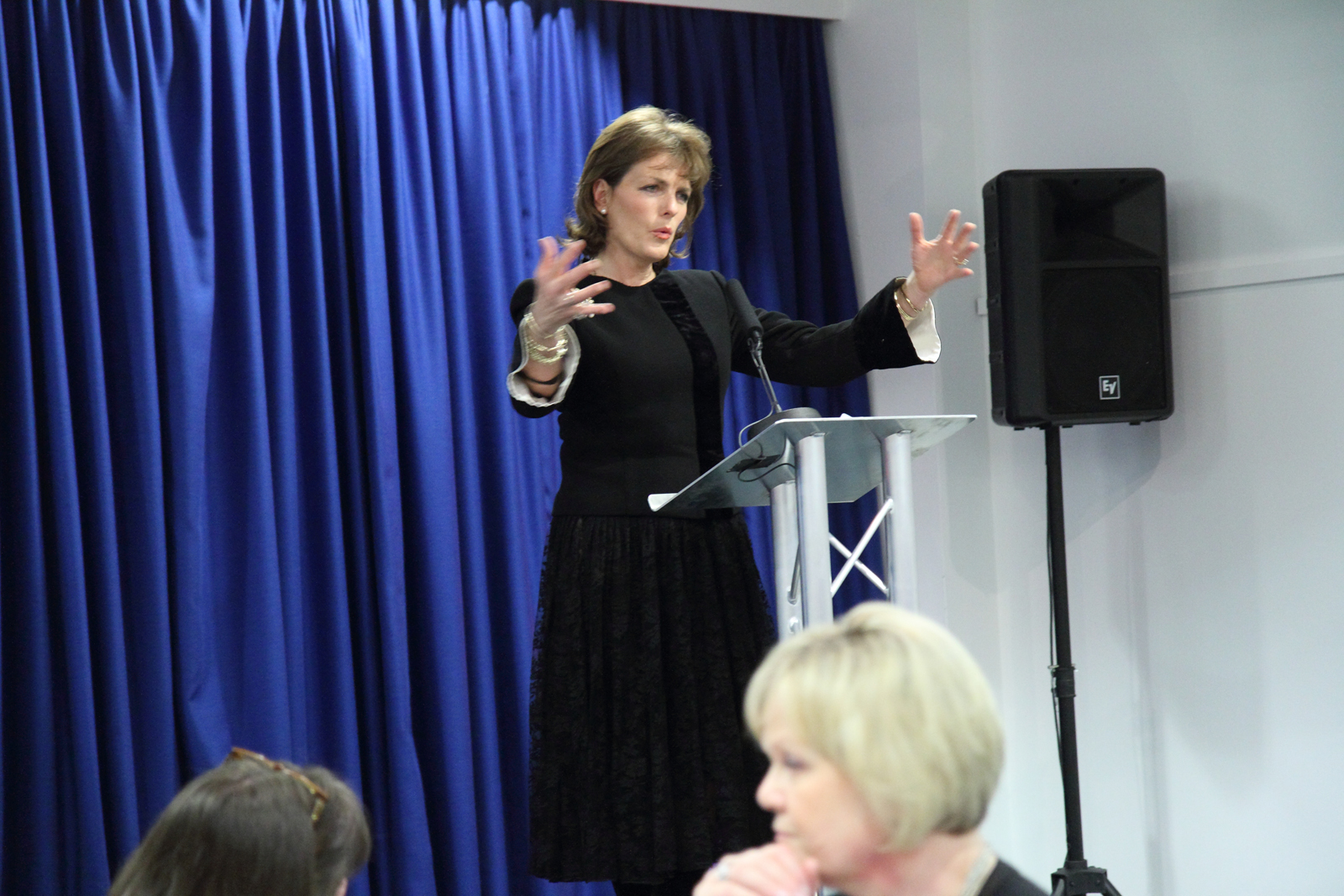
- Manners in 2011

Personal details
- Born: Rachel Emma Watkins; 2 September 1963 (age 63) Knighton, Radnorshire, Wales
- Spouse: David Manners, 11th Duke of Rutland (m. 1992; sep. 2012)
- Children: Violet Lindesay-Bethune, Countess of Lindsay; Lady Alice Manners; Lady Eliza Manners; Charles Manners, Marquess of Granby; Lord Hugo Manners

Rachel Emma Manners, Duchess of Rutland (née Watkins; born 2 September 1963) is a British noblewoman and podcaster. She is the estranged wife of David Manners, 11th Duke of Rutland, and chief executive of Belvoir Castle, the family estate.

== Childhood and education ==
Emma Watkins is the daughter of a farmer from Knighton, Powys (then within Radnorshire), Wales.

Until the financial crash of 1929, the Watkins family had been tenant farmers on the Stanage estate. However, to cover death duties, the Coltman-Rogers family sold Heartsease farmhouse to Emma’s grandfather. In 1962, when her parents John and Roma (née Davies) married, her grandfather passed the management of Heartsease to her father. Her grandfather died when she was just nine years of age.

Whilst her brothers, William and Roger, were privately educated, Emma was sent to the local primary school at Bucknell, Shropshire. This was due to financial difficulties her parents were having at that time. Emma faced challenges in her studies, primarily due to dyslexia.

She attended prep school at Croftdown, to prepare for the entrance exam to Ellerslie School, where girls were not permitted to leave the premises. However, Emma was granted special dispensation to visit the dentist. On one occasion, she attempted to run away from prep school but was quickly picked up by the police, as her uniform made her easily identifiable. During her time at the school, she served as captain of the high jump team. She was allowed to return home every three weeks.

During her teenage years, each year in late autumn or early winter, her parents would organise their own shoots, with Emma receiving between twenty and fifty pheasants. These shoots, along with parties held in the long barn, provided entertainment for the local community. During the summer holidays, she stayed at a holiday house in Borth, where she spent time with her parents, cousins, and uncles.

Emma received distinctions in all eight grades of her singing exams, completed piano up to grade 7, and also played the guitar. After schooling at Ellerslie School, Malvern, she started training as an opera singer at the Guildhall School of Music, and she flat shared in London with a friend, but ended up dropping out, although stayed until the end of that year.

Her early employment included working on a lambing line and carrying out various farm-related tasks. At the age of 15, she took on her first paid role with the Royal Welsh Agricultural Society, selling cheese at the Royal Welsh Show.

After dropping out of the Guildhall School, she took a job as a nanny for a wealthy Argentine family with two children in Fulham. Simultaneously, she explored the possibility of studying land management and enrolled in an evening course. In 1984, she was accepted into Southampton College of Higher Education. During the second summer of her degree, she applied to Camp America, a programme that arranges holiday jobs for foreign students, and took on a nannying role once more, outside Boston.

== Marriage, issue & other relationships ==
The Duchess met her husband at a dinner party, unaware that he was the heir to a dukedom.

After attending a friend's wedding in Yorkshire, she first visited the Belvoir Estate at the invitation of David, then Marquess of Granby, following directions he had given her beforehand, as she was unfamiliar with the area. It was after this visit, and through a mutual friend, that she learned about David's heritage.

Watkins married David in 1992. She has spoken about the moment she suspected her husband was having an affair. In May 2009, she hosted a 1920s-themed party for 320 guests to celebrate the Duke’s 50th birthday. The evening included a formal dinner, a ceremonial cake-cutting, and live music. During the festivities, she asked the Duke to dance, but he declined, stating that he was "busy." Shortly afterward, she saw him laughing with another woman, an experience she later described as feeling like "a punch."

She reports having five miscarriages, multiple panic attacks, and a nervous breakdown in 2017.

Although they separated in 2012, they continue to cohabitate, each having their own living quarters at Belvoir Castle, a castle with 356 rooms.

The couple has five children:

- Violet Lindesay-Bethune, Countess of Lindsay (born 18 August 1993), married in 2025, William James Lindesay-Bethune, 17th Earl of Lindsay;
- Lady Alice Louisa Lilly Manners (b. 27 April 1995);
- Lady Eliza Charlotte Manners (b. 17 July 1997);
- Charles John Montague Manners, Marquess of Granby (b. 3 July 1999);
- Lord Hugo William James Manners (b. 24 July 2003).

The family initially lived in the adjacent Knipton Lodge, a six-bedroomed Georgian house. Following the death in 1999 of the 10th Duke, they moved into newly renovated private apartments in 2001 which had formerly been the nanny's residence.

In 2017, she reported having a partner, Phil Burtt, who lived in Croxton and was managing the estates at the time. Phil Burtt was initially hired by the Duke and the Duchess as their shoot manager, progressing to estates manager some years later. Both Emma and Phil met at a shoot.

=== Views on succession ===
In the future, the eldest son, Charles, is set to inherit Belvoir Castle and his father's title. There are questions regarding the Duchess's views on this succession and whether she would support changes to the laws surrounding primogeniture that would allow her eldest daughter to inherit the estate as well. She has expressed that she does not identify as a feminist, stating that she believes men are typically considered the bloodline in matters of heritage. She views the role of women as being supportive of men and facilitating their aspirations.

Having expressed support for the tradition of inheritance passing through the male line, she stated that she is pleased her daughter will not inherit the dukedom due to the responsibilities involved. She has indicated that she does not want her eldest child, Violet, to take on the role of managing the estate. Speaking at The Hay Festival, she stated that she believes it is appropriate for her son, Charles, Marquess of Granby, to inherit the title.

The Duchess has acknowledged the role that women play in managing and maintaining stately homes. She has also credited Britain’s male nobility with recognising the contributions of their wives, not only in overseeing the upkeep of historic estates but also in fostering connections between the aristocracy and local communities.

== Career ==
=== Early career ===
While on a skiing trip with her brothers, Emma secured a job with Bladon Lines in Switzerland, working as a chalet girl.

She trained as a land agent in Southampton and worked for the firm Coles Knapp and Kennedy in Ross-on-Wye, earning an annual salary of £2,500. Emma quickly moved into working in estate agents marketing properties in London. She later worked as an interior designer, visiting wholesalers for materials and attending trade fairs, including Decorex at Earls Court. Her first business venture in interior design was Eardisley Park Interiors, that she founded alongside a friend, at the age of 25.

She sold her interior design business in Herefordshire when she got married and sold a garden conservatory business when her father-in-law died. With these sale proceeds she bought a chalet in Les Diablerets, Switzerland.

=== CEO of Belvoir Castle ===
A divorce lawyer advised her that she could expect a settlement of £30 million. However, with her long-standing involvement in managing the estate’s finances, she believed that such a settlement would jeopardise Belvoir Castle, potentially leading to its sale or conversion into a commercial venue. Therefore, Emma Manners was appointed CEO of Belvoir Castle and estate following an agreement with her husband after their separation. Under this arrangement, she was allowed to manage the castle to prevent further debt that could have arisen from a formal divorce.

Today, the Duchess runs the commercial activities of Belvoir Castle, including shooting parties, weddings, conferences and corporate entertainment, holiday parties, and ranges of country wear, furniture and flavoured mineral waters. The castle is also open to the public, as another revenue stream and they have a restaurant.

She has presented on various television programmes, including ITV's Castles, Keeps and Country Homes. She uses social media and travels around the world to promote the castle, and has hosted clients from Russia, China and the United States.

She has co-written two books about Belvoir Castle, including one about her work landscaping the estate The Belvoir estate consists of 15,000 acres of land. This land is now subject to inheritance tax based on the UK governments tax changes with respect to farmland and inheritance announced in 2024. The Duchess has spoken out against this change and marched with farmers to protest.

One of the Duchess’s significant projects has been the completion of Capability Brown’s unfinished design for the gardens and grounds of Belvoir Castle. The project began after she discovered his original drawings and aimed to realise the landscape architect’s vision, which remained incomplete at the time of his death in 1783. Work on the restoration began in 2011, following the original designs closely.

During a renovation process, the Duchess encountered challenges, including the unintentional removal of more than 50 trees that had been planted in memory of soldiers who died during the Second World War.

The Duchess has noted that maintaining a historic estate is not primarily focused on generating profit, but rather on sustaining and preserving the property. She has highlighted ongoing investments in Belvoir Castle’s upkeep, including £150,000 spent on roof repairs in one year and £100,000 the following year. Additional upgrades have included improvements to lighting, costing between £30,000 and £40,000, the refurbishment of a bedroom, and the installation of a commercial lift for accessibility at a cost of £80,000.

For a period of ten years, a ten-bedroom hotel located on the estate was operated as part of its commercial activities. Originally established in a former hunting lodge historically used by the family, the hotel was intended to support estate shoots and events. The venture ultimately recorded a financial loss of £250,000 and was later discontinued.

In 2019, the Duchess oversaw the opening of a retail village situated below the castle, with all units operated by independent tenants. One of the units, a butcher’s shop, began selling beef produced on the estate.

In 2021, she oversaw preparations for a Regency-themed christmas event at Belvoir Castle, one of the key annual occasions at the estate. Designed by Charlotte Lloyd Webber, the event featured elaborately decorated rooms and a themed light trail, which opened in November that year.

In 2023, historic ceremonial robes worn at the coronation of George VI in 1937 were displayed at Belvoir Castle in Leicestershire for the first time in 22 years. Originally made for the ninth Duke of Rutland, the robes were showcased alongside coronation chairs and archival family photographs. The Duchess of Rutland highlighted the significance of displaying the robes during the coronation year of King Charles III. The robes had also been worn by the tenth Duke of Rutland at the coronation of Elizabeth II in 1953.

In late 2024, The Manners Arms, a Grade II listed building and a country house hotel and pub in Knipton, Leicestershire, underwent a refurbishment overseen by Emma Manners, Duchess of Rutland. The project aimed to restore the former shooting lodge, preserving its 18th-century features while updating the bar, dining area, and ten bedrooms.

In 2025, Emma Manners, Duchess of Rutland, led an exhibition at Belvoir Castle exploring the lives of the duchesses, countesses, and other women who have lived there over the past 500 years. The Motherhood exhibition examined their roles and contributions, featuring figures such as Eleanor, the first Countess of Rutland, and Nanny Webb, a long-serving staff member. Items on display included historic wedding gowns, evening dresses, and nightwear worn by past duchesses, as well as the Emma Manner’s wedding dress.

== Recent years ==
In July 2024, the Duchess of Rutland was diagnosed with stage two breast cancer following a routine mammogram. Initially planning for a lumpectomy, her medical team later determined that a mastectomy was necessary due to the extent of the disease, though the cancer had not spread beyond the breast. She underwent surgery in September 2024, followed by a short course of preventative radiotherapy. The Duchess adopted a structured approach to treatment, making changes to her diet, routine, and wellbeing practices, combining conventional medical approaches with complementary therapies. Following successful treatment, she was declared in remission. Reflecting on her experience, she expressed gratitude for her medical team and viewed the diagnosis as a transformative period in her life.

== Podcasting ==
In 2021, the Duchess created a podcast titled Duchess, where she interviews châtelaines of castles and stately homes and historic estates throughout the United Kingdom. She credits her daughter Violet with inspiring this idea. The podcast has achieved 1.5 million listens and released four seasons.

== Charity works ==
The Duchess is a patron of Rainbows, a children's hospice in the East Midlands. Additionally, she co-founded the Belvoir Cricket and Countryside Trust, a charity that brings children from urban areas to the countryside each year to learn about rural life.

The Countryside and Cricket Trust, managed by former cricketer Darren Bicknell, provides opportunities for hundreds of boys and girls from nearby towns and inner-city areas to access and enjoy Belvoir’s cricket facilities.

The Place Independent School in Bottesford launched an award scheme, developed in collaboration with the Duchess of Rutland, aimed at supporting the physical and mental well-being of pupils with special educational needs and disabilities. Inspired by the Duke of Edinburgh’s Award, the programme includes a series of progressive levels which involve outdoor education, physical activity, volunteering, and well-being initiatives. Participants who complete the programme receive formal recognition at a ceremony held at Belvoir Castle.

== Books ==
The Duchess of Rutland has several published books, including a autobiography published in 2022:

- Belvoir Castle: A Thousand Years of Family Art and Architecture (2009), co-written with Jane Pruden;
- Shooting: A Season of Discovery (2012), co-written with Jane Pruden;
- Capability Brown & Belvoir: Discovering a Lost Landscape (2015), co-written with Jane Pruden;
- The Accidental Duchess: From Farmer's Daughter to Belvoir Castle (2022), her autobiography.
