= Duchess of Rutland (ship) =

Several ships have been named Duchess of Rutland (or Dutchess of Rutland) for one of the Duchesses of Rutland.

- Duchess of Rutland (1786 ship) was launched in Dublin. She carried passengers between England and Ireland. In 1793 she apparently transferred to Liverpool and sailed from there as a West Indiaman. She was on a voyage to Barbados when a French privateer captured her in 1797.
- Duchess of Rutland (1799 ship) was launched in Sweden in 1786 under another name. She was taken in prize in 1799 and thereafter served as a transport. French frigates captured and burnt her on 4 February 1805 as she was sailing in convoy from Malta to London.
