= Phillipa Lepley =

British fashion designer

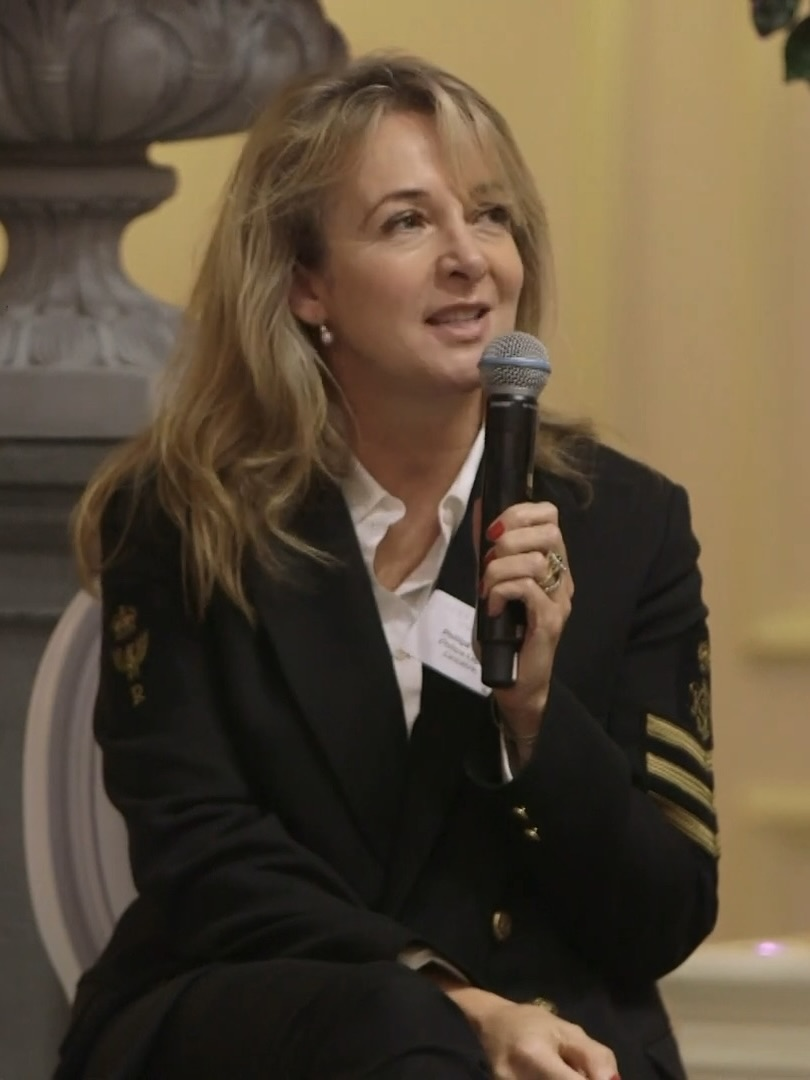
Lepley in 2019

Phillipa Lepley is a British fashion designer and couturier based in London. She is the founder and creative director of Phillipa Lepley Ltd, a couture house established in 1986. Lepley is known for creating bespoke wedding dresses and eveningwear.

== Early life and education ==
Lepley grew up in Nottinghamshire, learning sewing and embroidery from her grandmothers, one of whom worked as a court tailoress. She studied Fashion Design at the London College of Fashion. She undertook a couture apprenticeship in Holland Park, London, before launching her label in 1986.

== Career ==
Lepley opened her first store in Fulham in 1990 and later moved to the flagship atelier in Chelsea, London.

== Design ==
Her work is described as focused on couture craftsmanship, corsetry and classic silhouettes rather than trend-led designs. Inspiration for her embroidery often comes from natural motifs.

== Notable clients ==
- Catherine, Princess of Wales, who wore a turquoise evening gown by Lepley during the 2022 Caribbean tour, and a gold evening coat and gown to the state banquet at Windsor Castle in September 2025.
- Geri Halliwell, who wore a Phillipa Lepley gown for her 2015 wedding.
- Jacqui Ainsley, who wore a bespoke gown for her 2015 wedding to Guy Ritchie.
- Talulah Riley, who wore a Phillipa Lepley gown for her 2024 wedding.
- Princess Aisha bint Faisal of Jordan, who wore a bespoke gown for her 2025 wedding.
- Lady Violet Manners, who wore a bespoke gown for her 2025 wedding to William Lindesay-Bethune, Viscount Garnock.

== Recognition ==
Lepley has been listed among leading British bridal designers by publications including Vogue, Tatler, Harper’s Bazaar, and Luxury London. Her work and commentary have appeared in wider discussions of wedding trends and couture fashion.
