= Lady Alice Manners =

21st-century English socialite and model

- Born: Alice Louisa Lilly Manners; 27 April 1995 (age 31); Nottingham, England
- Father: David Manners, 11th Duke of Rutland
- Mother: Emma Watkins
- Occupation: Columnist; model

Lady Alice Louisa Lilly Manners (born 27 April 1995) is an English columnist, fashion model and socialite.

== Early life and education ==
Lady Alice is the second child of David Manners, 11th Duke of Rutland and Emma Manners, Duchess of Rutland. She is an older sister of Charles Manners, Marquess of Granby and Lord Hugo Manners.

She attended Queen Margaret's School, York along with her two sisters, Lady Violet and Lady Eliza. After secondary school, Alice attended the Condé Nast College of Fashion and Design.

== Career ==
She worked as a personal shopper at Selfridges, as a stylist, and as a model. She is signed with Leni's Models agency, having posed for Bare Minerals, Matthew Williamson, and Ralph Lauren and having walked the runway for Dolce & Gabbana. She had placements with magazines including Vogue and Tatler, and a fashion diploma at the Conde Nast College.

She is also a writer, with her own fashion column in The Sunday Telegraph. She is a high-profile figure of the London social scene. She and her sisters, known for outlandish behaviour and partying, have been dubbed "the bad-Manners girls" and "no Manners sisters" by the press.

In 2017, Vanity Fair referred to Lady Alice Manners and her sisters as the "real-life Crawley sisters of London", drawing a comparison to the fictional aristocratic family from Downton Abbey.

== Personal life ==
Reflecting on family celebrations, Lady Alice has described her father's 50th birthday party at Belvoir Castle as a particular highlight, recalling that guests wore 1920s attire and that the atmosphere evoked the castle's historic character.

For her 18th birthday in 2013, Lady Alice's younger brothers, Charles Manners, Marquess of Granby, and Lord Hugo Manners, made a notable entrance on camels. Her grandmother, Roma Watkins, attended in a bellydancer costume, and family friend Gus Cameron, nephew of David Cameron, dressed as a sheikh.

In 2015, Alice and her sisters faced complaints from neighbours about loud parties at their home in Fulham. One neighbour reportedly contacted the Duke of Rutland and the local council, and the police were called on at least one occasion.

In July 2016, she attended the Gentleman’s Journal summer party in Chelsea alongside her sister, Lady Violet Manners. Held during the Masterpiece London art fair, the event featured a performance by magician Archie Manners and drew a crowd of young figures from London’s social scene.

In 2020, Lady Alice was reported to be the long-term partner of Otis Ferry, the son of Bryan Ferry, and to be living with him at Belvoir Castle. It was reported that they both ended their relationship in 2022.

In November 2024, Alice participated in a demonstration in London, alongside her siblings and other individuals, including members of the aristocracy, opposing proposed changes to inheritance tax. The event included a march on Whitehall in support of British farmers that voiced concerns that the proposed reforms could impact the viability of family-run farms and rural estates.

In April 2025, Lady Alice celebrated her 30th birthday with a Midsummer Night’s Dream-themed event at Belvoir Castle, the family’s estate in Leicestershire. Joined by her sisters, Lady Eliza and Lady Violet, along with guests from British high society, the celebration featured elaborate floral decorations, theatrical costumes, and a banquet styled with natural motifs. The event reflected the Manners family's longstanding tradition of hosting social gatherings at the castle.

In June 2025, Lady Alice Manners served as a bridesmaid at the wedding of her elder sister, Violet, held at Belvoir Castle. She was joined by their sister, Lady Eliza Manners, and Devisha Kumari Singh.

In November 2026, Lady Alice became engaged to Patrick Fordham.
