= James Lindesay-Bethune, 16th Earl of Lindsay =

Scottish peer (1955–2026)

The Right Honourable The Earl of Lindsay DL
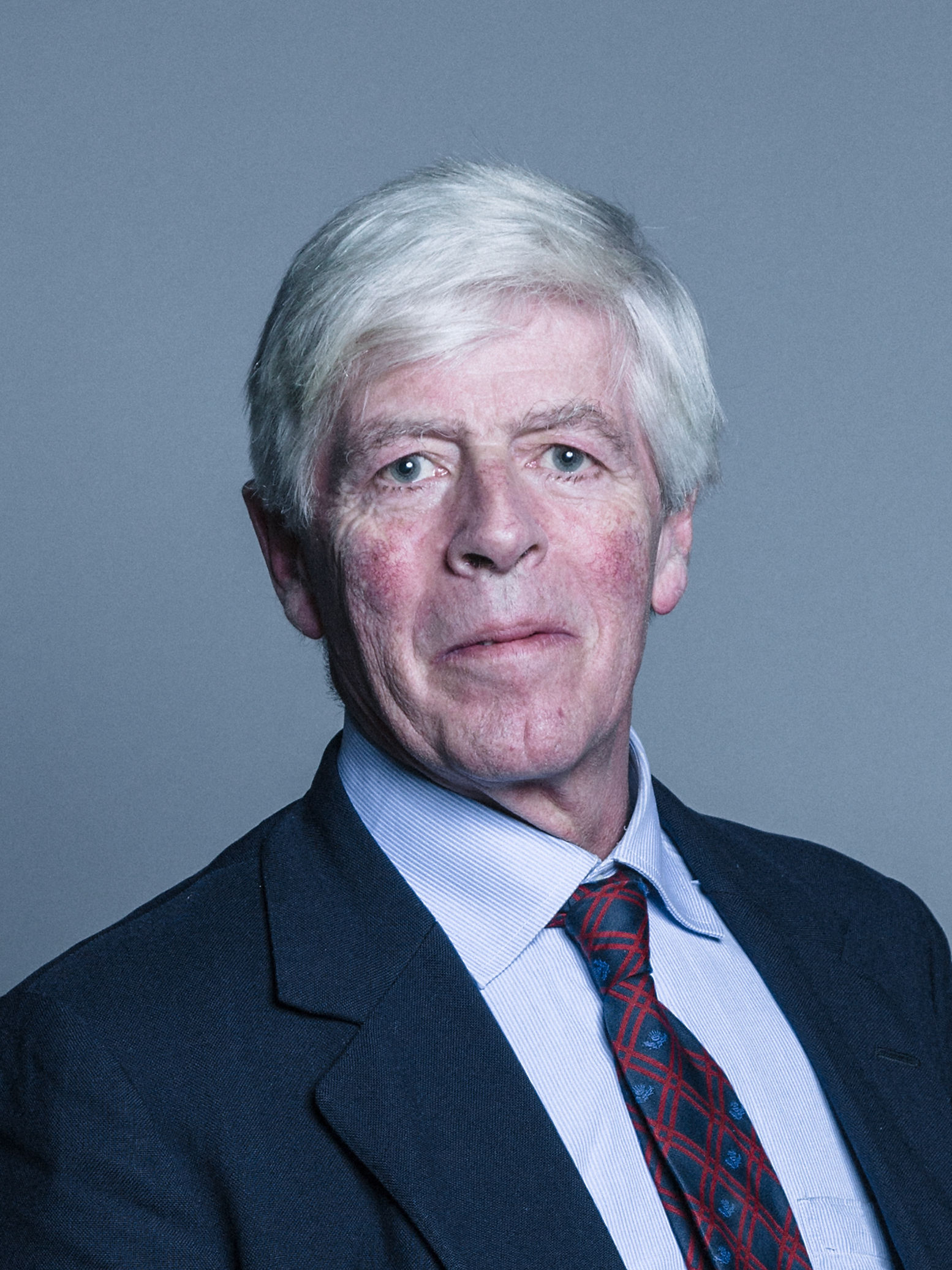
- Lindesay-Bethune in 2018

Member of the House of Lords
- Lord Temporal
- Hereditary peerage 21 December 1989 – 11 November 1999
- Preceded by: The 15th Earl of Lindsay
- Succeeded by: Seat abolished
- Elected Hereditary Peer; 11 November 1999 – 29 April 2026
- Election: 1999
- Preceded by: Seat established
- Succeeded by: Seat abolished

Parliamentary Under-Secretary of State for Scotland
- In office 6 July 1995 – 2 May 1997
- Prime Minister: John Major
- Preceded by: Sir Hector Monro
- Succeeded by: Sam Galbraith

Lord-in-waiting Government Whip
- In office 12 January 1995 – 6 July 1995
- Prime Minister: John Major
- Preceded by: The Lord Inglewood
- Succeeded by: The Earl of Courtown

Personal details
- Born: James Randolph Lindesay-Bethune; 19 November 1955
- Died: 9 October 2026 (aged 70)
- Party: Conservative
- Spouse: Diana Chamberlayne-Macdonald (m. 1982)
- Children: Lady Frances Gabinsky; Lady Alexandra Coleman; William Lindesay-Bethune, 17th Earl of Lindsay; Hon. David Lindesay-Bethune; Princess Charlotte, Duchess of Noto
- Parents: David Lindesay-Bethune, 15th Earl of Lindsay (father); Hon. Mary Douglas-Scott-Montagu (mother)
- Education: University of Edinburgh; University of California, Davis

James Randolph Lindesay-Bethune, 16th Earl of Lindsay (19 November 1955 – 9 October 2026) was a Scottish businessman and Conservative politician.

== Early life ==
The son of David Lindesay-Bethune, 15th Earl of Lindsay, and his first wife Mary Douglas-Scott-Montagu, he was educated at Eton, the University of Edinburgh and the University of California, Davis.

== Career ==
In 1989, he succeeded his father as Earl of Lindsay He was vice-chairman of the Inter-Party Union Committee on Environment 1994–95, and was Parliamentary Under-Secretary of State for Scotland from 1995 to 1997, during which time he was responsible for agriculture, fisheries and the environment. Between 2012 and 2017, Lord Lindsay was President of the National Trust of Scotland and appointed President of the Chartered Trading Standards Institute in April 2021.

== Personal life and death ==
In 1982 he married Diana Mary Chamberlayne-Macdonald, a granddaughter of Sir Alexander Somerled Angus Bosville Macdonald of Sleat, 16th Baronet; the two had five children:

- Lady Frances Mary Gabinsky (born 1986), married to Rostislav Gabinsky. They have a son, Alexander Fabian (born 2018), and twin daughters: Stella Penelope and Diana Sophia (born 2023)
- Lady Alexandra Penelope Lindesay-Bethune (born 1988), married to Jack Coleman. They have two sons: Nicholas Tankerville Wallace (born 2019) and James Horatio Somerled (born 2021).
- William James Lindesay-Bethune, 17th Earl of Lindsay, Master of Lindsay (b. 30 December 1990), married to Lady Violet Manners.
- The Hon. David Nigel Lindesay-Bethune (born 1993)
- Lady Charlotte Lindesay-Bethune (born 1993), married to Prince Jaime, Duke of Noto, on 25 September 2021 at Monreale Cathedral, Metropolitan City of Palermo. The couple has two daughters named Francesca Sofía and Inés.

The Countess of Lindsay is a patroness of the Royal Caledonian Ball and a master of the Fife Foxhounds.

Lord Lindsay died from complications of an aneurysm on 9 October 2026, aged 70.

== Arms ==
Coat of arms of James Lindesay-Bethune, 16th Earl of Lindsay
Coronet The coronet of an Earl Crest A swan with wings expanded proper. Escutcheon Quarterly, 1st & 4th: Gules, a fess chequy Azure and Argent, in chief three mullets of the second (Lindsay); 2nd & 3rd: counter-quartered, 1st & 4th: Azure, a fess between three lozenges Or (Bethune); 2nd & 3rd: Argent, on a chevron Sable, an otter's head erased of the first (Balfour) all within a bordure embattled Or. Supporters On both dexter and sinister, a griffin Gules, armed and legged Or Motto Above the crest: Je ayme (French: "I love"); Below shield: "Live but Dreid"

Peerage of Scotland
Preceded by David Lindesay-Bethune	Earl of Lindsay; 1989–2026; Member of the House of Lords (1989–1999)	Succeeded by William Lindesay-Bethune
Parliament of the United Kingdom
New office created by the House of Lords Act 1999	Elected hereditary peer to the House of Lords under the House of Lords Act 1999; 1999–2026	Office abolished under the House of Lords (Hereditary Peers) Act 2026
