= Briery Wood Heronry, Belvoir =

Protected area in Leicestershire, England

Coordinates: 52.887°N 0.775°W

- Site of Special Scientific Interest
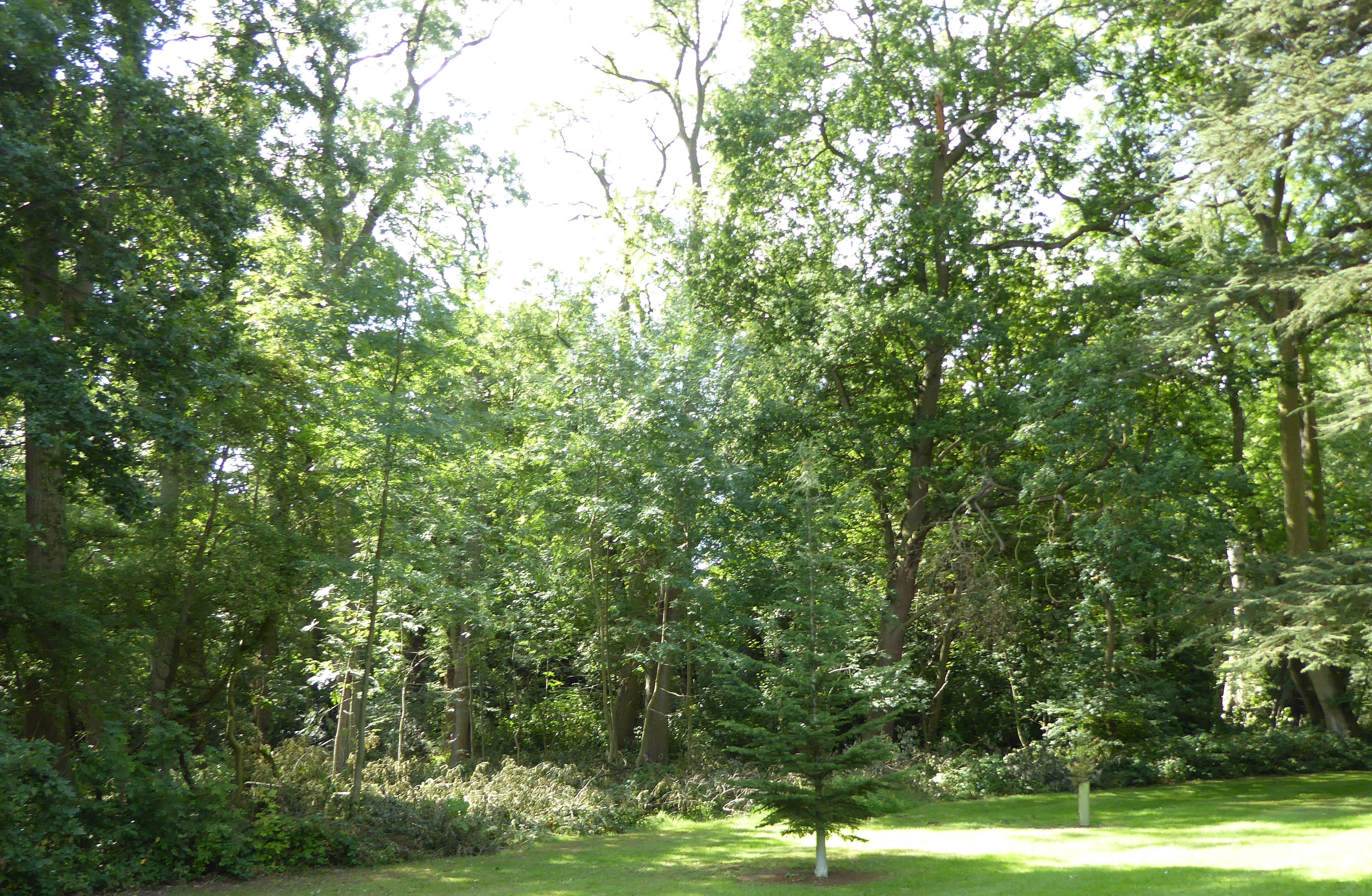
- Location of Briery Wood Heronry, Belvoir.
- Area of search: Leicestershire
- Grid reference: SK 824 329
- Interest: Biological
- Area: 5.7 hectares
- Notification date: 1983
- Location map: Magic Map

Briery Wood Heronry is a 5.7-hectare (14-acre) biological Site of Special Scientific Interest in the grounds of Belvoir Castle in Leicestershire.

This is the largest heronry in the county, with up to thirty breeding pairs. The dominant trees are mature oaks and ash, with a ground flora of bracken and dog's mercury.

The wood is in an area of the grounds which is not open to the public.
