= Frances Manners, Duchess of Rutland =

British peeress (1937–2024)

Her Grace The Duchess of Rutland
- Born: Frances Helen Sweeny; 19 June 1937; Marylebone, London, England
- Died: 21 January 2024 (aged 86); Belvoir Castle, Leicestershire, England
- Spouse: Charles Manners, 10th Duke of Rutland (m. 1958; died 1999)
- Issue: David Manners, 11th Duke of Rutland; Lord Robert Manners; Lady Theresa Chipman; Lord Edward Manners
- Parents: Charles Sweeny; Margaret Whigham

Frances Helen Manners, Duchess of Rutland (née Sweeny; 19 June 1937 – 21 January 2024) was a British peeress and socialite. The wife of Charles Manners, 10th Duke of Rutland, following his death in 1999, she was known as the Dowager Duchess of Rutland.

== Early life ==
Frances Helen Sweeny was born on 19 June 1937 at Beaumont House, a nursing home in Marylebone Lane, London, to American amateur golfer, socialite and businessman Charles Francis Sweeny and his wife, Scottish debutante Margaret Whigham. Her mother had suffered eight miscarriages and given birth to a stillborn daughter prior to her birth. She was baptised in the Catholic Church on 21 July 1937 at the Brompton Oratory. She had one younger brother, Brian Charles Sweeny (1940–2021).

Her parents divorced in 1947. Her mother subsequently married the 11th Duke of Argyll in 1951 and was divorced by him in 1963. Frances and her brother were largely raised by their mother's cook. She attended finishing school in Florence and Paris and was acclaimed "debutante of the year" in 1955.

== Marriage and family ==
On 15 May 1958, Sweeny married Charles Manners, 10th Duke of Rutland, considered one of Britain's most eligible bachelors, at Caxton Hall. She wore a pink organza cocktail dress by Norman Hartnell. Her mother had unsuccessfully petitioned the Vatican for an annulment of the Duke's previous marriage. They had four children:

- David Charles Robert Manners, 11th Duke of Rutland (born 8 May 1959), married Emma Watkins, and had issue
- Lord Robert George Manners (18 June 1961 – 28 February 1964)
- Lady Helen Theresa Margaret Manners (born 11 November 1962), married Dr. John Chipman, and had issue
- Lord Edward John Francis Manners (born 29 May 1965), married Gabrielle Ross, and had issue

Having once been close to her mother, the two had a falling out after the Duchess of Argyll insisted her daughter raise her children as Catholics. This, coupled with the embarrassment Frances felt over the press attention her mother's divorce was receiving, led to a two-decade rift. The two would often meet in London society, barely acknowledging one another. Mother and daughter did not reconcile until 1991, two years before Margaret's death.

As chatelaine of the 350-room Belvoir Castle in Leicestershire, Frances oversaw the revitalization of the gardens which had been neglected since World War II. She bred Arabian horses.

The Duchess was widowed in 1999. She died at Belvoir Castle on 21 January 2024, at the age of 86.

== In popular culture ==
Frances is portrayed by Phoebe Farnham in A Very British Scandal, a historical drama television miniseries portraying her mother's divorce from the Duke of Argyll in 1963.
