= Duchess of Rutland (1786 ship) =

Ship built in Dublin, captured in 1797

History

Great Britain
- Name: Duchess of Rutland
- Namesake: Duchess of Rutland
- Builder: Dublin, Ireland
- Launched: 1786
- Captured: 1797

General characteristics
- Tons burthen: 1781:74, (bm); 1797: 111 (bm)
- Complement: 12

Duchess of Rutland (or Dutchess of Rutland) was launched in 1786 in Dublin. She carried passengers between England and Ireland. In 1793 she apparently transferred to Liverpool and sailed from there as a West Indiaman. She was on a voyage to Barbados when a French privateer captured her in 1797.

== Career ==
Duchess of Rutland first appeared in Lloyd's Register (LR) in 1789. She appears to have carried passengers between England and Ireland, with her owners being a group of Holyhead packet captains.

Year	Master	Owner	Trade	Source
1789	B.Stewart	Cunningham	Greenock–Ireland	LR
1792	B.Stewart	Cunningham	Greenock–Ireland	LR

Duchess of Rutland was last listed in LR in 1793. Dutchess of Rugland apparently had been sold to owners in Liverpool, who had her lengthened. She appeared in the Register of Shipping in 1800. It showed her master as T. Keen, owner J.Jackson, and trading out of Liverpool. However, this represented stale data as Duchess of Rutland had been captured several years earlier.

== Fate ==
Duchess of Rutland, Keen, master, was sailing from Liverpool to Barbados when in late 1797 she encountered the French privateer Vengeance, a cutter of 20 guns and 200 men. Vengeance captured Duchess of Rutland at 46°41′N 21°31′W. (Note: Vengeance was probably a schooner from Saint-Domingue that had been commissioned in February 1797. The USS Trumbull captured her in August 1800.)
