= Ellerslie School =

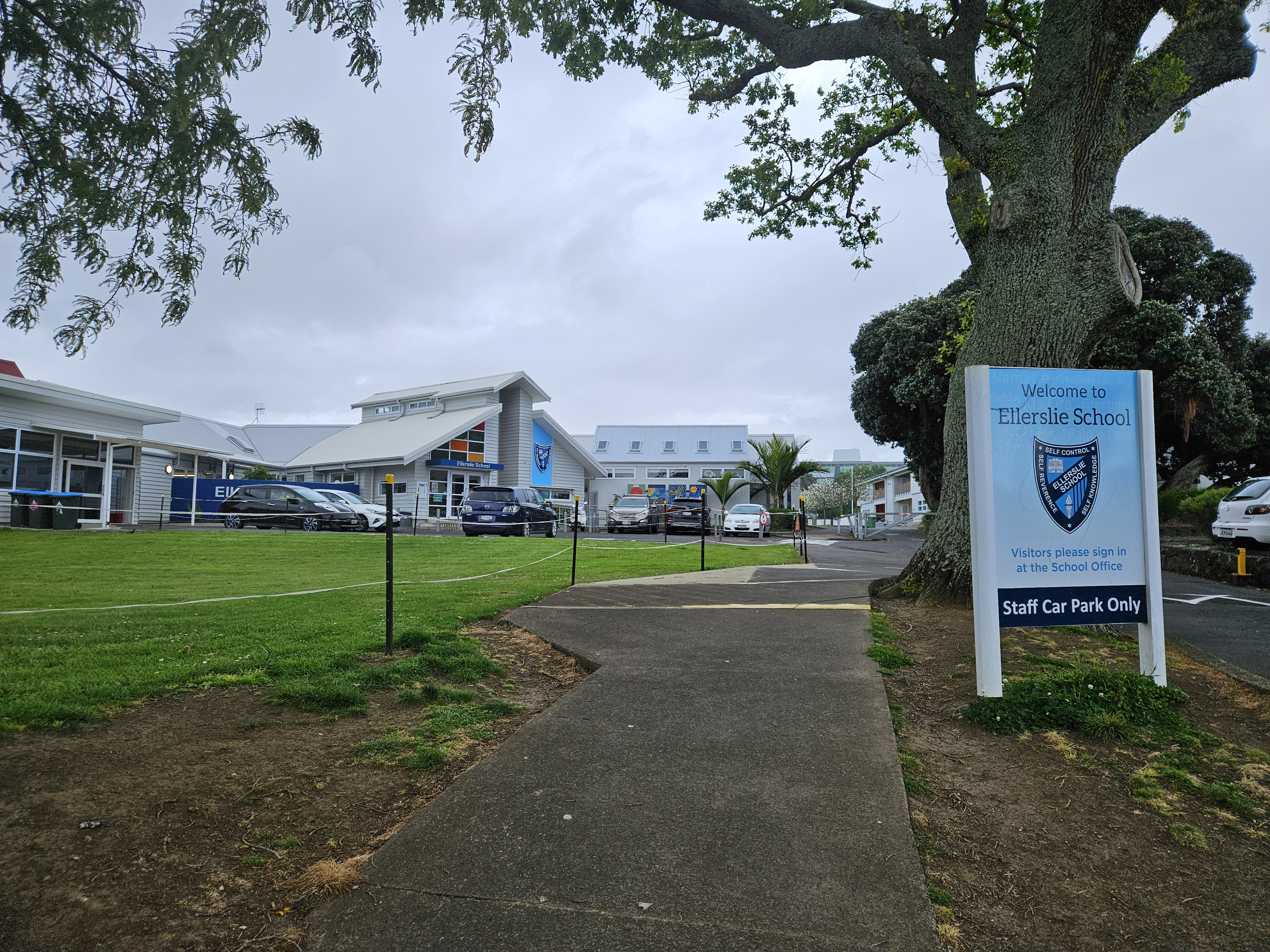

Location
- 12 Kalmia Street, Ellerslie, Auckland, New Zealand; 36.8985°S 174.8060°E

Information
- Type: State Co-Ed Full Primary (Year 1-8)
- Motto: Acknowledging yesterday. Learning today. Preparing for tomorrow.
- Established: 1877
- Ministry of Education Institution no.: 1268
- Principal: Nick Butler
- Enrolment: 746 (July 2026)
- Website: ellerslie.school.nz

Ellerslie School was founded in 1877, making it one of the oldest schools in Auckland, New Zealand. It is a Year 1 to Year 8 school.

Ellerslie has a roll of 746 students (as of July 2026), with most students living in the Ellerslie/Greenlane area.

Ellerslie School is in zone for One Tree Hill College.

The current principal is Nick Butler.

The Intermediate area of the school was upgraded in 2007, has a multi-purpose technology block and a music suite.
