= William Lindesay-Bethune, 17th Earl of Lindsay =

British aristocrat (born 1990)

The Right Honourable The Earl of Lindsay
- Born: William James Lindesay-Bethune; 30 December 1990 (age 35)
- Spouse: Lady Violet Manners (m. 2025)
- Issue: John Reggie James Lindesay-Bethune, Viscount Garnock
- Father: James Lindesay-Bethune, 16th Earl of Lindsay
- Mother: Diana Chamberlayne-Macdonald

William Lindesay-Bethune, 17th Earl of Lindsay (born 30 December 1990) is a British nobleman who is the 17th and current Earl of Lindsay. He is the third child and elder son of the 16th Earl of Lindsay.

== Life and family connections ==
The Earl of Lindsay is a member of the Lindesay-Bethune family, of Scottish descent. He is the third child and elder son of James Lindesay-Bethune, 16th Earl of Lindsay, and his wife, Diana Mary Chamberlayne-Macdonald. She is a granddaughter of Sir Alexander Somerled Angus Bosville Macdonald of Sleat, 16th Baronet.

He has four siblings, including Lady Frances (born 1986), who is married to Rostislav Gabinsky, and Lady Charlotte (born 1993), who is married to Prince Jaime, Duke of Noto, heir to the headship of the House of Bourbon-Two Sicilies.

As his father's heir, he previously held the courtesy title of Viscount Garnock.

He is the founder of Feragaia, a non-alcoholic spirits company.

Upon the death of his father in October 2026, he inherited the title of 17th Earl of Lindsay.

== Personal life ==
Lindsay met Lady Violet Manners, daughter of the 11th Duke of Rutland and Emma, Duchess of Rutland, in late 2023, at his family home in Scotland. They were introduced by his youngest sister and her husband, the Duke of Noto, who invited him to a New Year's party.

In July 2024, after six months of long-distance dating, Lindsay became engaged to Lady Violet. It was reported that the wedding would be held at Belvoir Castle and would be a private occasion, not open to the public.

The marriage took place on 21 June 2025 at Belvoir Castle, in the presence of numerous members of the British aristocracy. They were married at the Church of St Mary the Virgin, Bottesford. The groom wore a kilt in the Lindesay family tartan, complete with a tasselled sporran. The ceremony was officiated by Stuart, the Manners family's vicar for 20 years, and marked the union of two distinguished families with ancestral ties to the English and Scottish peerages, whose lineages date back to the Norman Conquest. The best men were Archie, Lord Cochrane, and the Hon. David Lindesay-Bethune. Guests at the wedding included Lady Tatiana Mountbatten, Sabrina Percy, and Flora Vesterberg. The honeymoon was in South Africa.

In March 2026, the couple announced that they were expecting their first child. Their son John Reggie James Lindesay-Bethune was born on 4 July 2026.

== Arms ==
Coat of arms of William Lindesay-Bethune, 17th Earl of Lindsay
Coronet The coronet of an Earl Crest A swan with wings expanded proper. Escutcheon Quarterly, 1st & 4th: Gules, a fess chequy Azure and Argent, in chief three mullets of the second (Lindsay); 2nd & 3rd: counter-quartered, 1st & 4th: Azure, a fess between three lozenges Or (Bethune); 2nd & 3rd: Argent, on a chevron Sable, an otter's head erased of the first (Balfour) all within a bordure embattled Or. Supporters On both dexter and sinister, a griffin Gules, armed and legged Or Motto Above the crest: Je ayme (French: "I love"); Below shield: "Live but Dreid"

Peerage of Scotland
Preceded by James Lindesay-Bethune	Earl of Lindsay; 2026–present	Incumbent heir apparent: John Lindesay-Bethune, Viscount Garnock
