= Duke of Rutland =

Title in the Peerage of England

Dukedom of Rutland
- Arms of Manners: Or, two bars azure a chief quarterly azure and gules; in the 1st and 4th quarters two fleurs-de-lis and in the 2nd and 3rd a lion passant guardant or
- Creation date: 29 March 1703
- Created by: Anne
- Peerage: Peerage of England
- First holder: John Manners, 9th Earl of Rutland
- Present holder: David Manners, 11th Duke
- Heir apparent: Charles Manners, Marquess of Granby
- Subsidiary titles: Marquess of Granby; Earl of Rutland; Lord Manners of Haddon; Baron Manners; Baron Roos
- Seat: Belvoir Castle
- Former seat: Haddon Hall
- Motto: Pour y parvenir ("So as to accomplish")

Duke of Rutland is a title in the Peerage of England that is named after Rutland, a county in the East Midlands of England. Earldoms named after Rutland have been created three times. The ninth earl of the third creation was made a duke in 1703, in whose family's line the title continues. The heir apparent to the dukedom uses the courtesy title of Marquess of Granby.

== Earldom of Rutland ==
=== First creation ===
The title Earl of Rutland was created on 25 February 1390 for Edward of Norwich (1373–1415), son of Edmund of Langley, 1st Duke of York, and grandson of King Edward III. Upon the Duke's death in 1402 Edward became Duke of York. The title became extinct upon Edward of Norwich's death at the Battle of Agincourt in 1415.

=== Second creation ===
The title Earl of Rutland was created for a second time on 29 January 1446 for Edmund (1443–1460), second son of Richard Plantagenet, 3rd Duke of York (and younger brother of the future King Edward IV).

=== Third creation ===
Thomas Manners (c. 1488–1543), son of the 11th Baron de Ros, was created Earl of Rutland in the Peerage of England in 1525. He was the great-grandson of Richard Plantagenet. The barony of 'de Ros' (sometimes spelt Ros, Roos or de Roos) was created by Simon de Montfort with a writ of summons to the House of Lords for Robert de Ros (1223–1285) in 1264. The title may pass through the female line when there is no male heir, and accordingly, when the 3rd Earl, Edward Manners (c. 1548–1587), left no sons, the barony of Ros passed to the family of his daughter Elizabeth (died 1591) who became the wife of the 2nd Earl of Exeter. The 3rd Earl was succeeded as the 4th Earl by his brother John (died 1588). The barony of Ros was restored to the Manners family when Francis Manners, the 6th Earl (1578–1632), inherited it in 1618 from his cousin William Cecil (1590–1618). However, Francis died without male issue and the assumption of the courtesy title of Lord Ros for the eldest son of subsequent earls appears to have had no legal basis. On the death of the seventh Earl in 1641 the Earldom passed to his distant cousin John Manners of Haddon Hall, grandson of the second son of the first Earl.

== Dukedom of Rutland ==
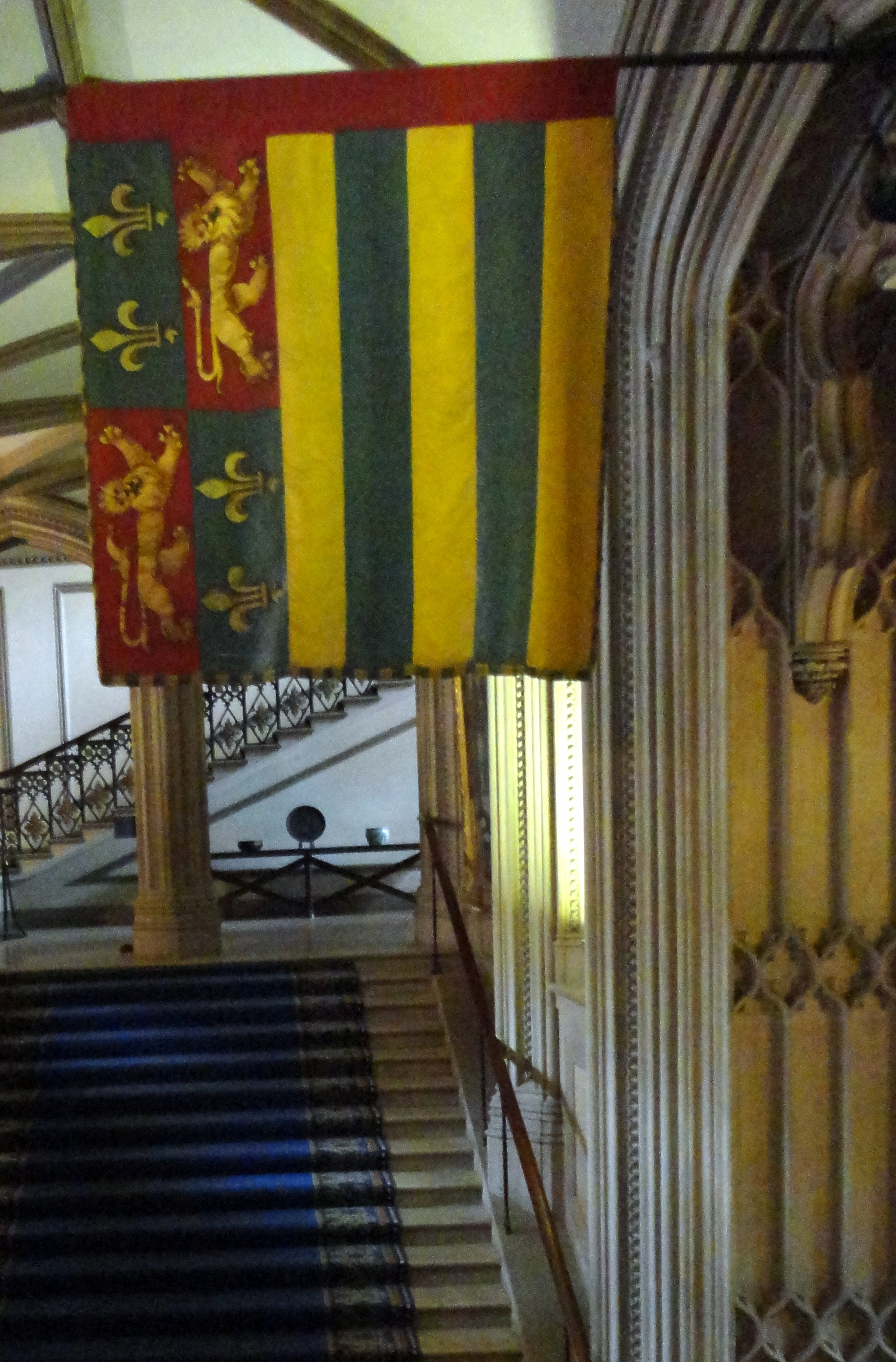
The 8th Duke of Rutland's banner as Knight of the Garter, now on display at Belvoir Castle

In 1703, the ninth Earl of Rutland was created Duke of Rutland and Marquess of Granby by Queen Anne.

=== Marquess of Granby ===
The most notable Marquess of Granby was John Manners (1721–1770), eldest son of the third Duke. He was an accomplished soldier and highly popular figure of his time; in 1745 he became a colonel; his military career flourished during the Seven Years' War.

At the Battle of Minden (1 August 1759), although his role was small, he commanded the reserve cavalry. In 1760, at the Battle of Warburg, he led a cavalry charge which routed the French, losing his hat and wig in the process. In recognition of this, soldiers of the Blues and Royals (his former regiment) have the unique privilege in the British Army of being permitted to salute while not wearing headgear. Granby's losing his helmet and wig in the charge gave rise to the expression 'going bald-headed' at something.

In 1758, the King made him Colonel of the Royal Horse Guards and in 1766, as Lieutenant-General, he became Commander-in-Chief (a basically political appointment). His title was honoured by being used by a large number of pubs throughout Britain. As Colonel, he provided for his most capable soldiers such that when they could no longer be of service to the Regiment, he would give them financial support to start a pub, the sole condition being that the pub was to be named "The Marquis of Granby" after him. The towns of Granby, Quebec in Canada and Granby, Massachusetts and Granby, Connecticut in the United States as well as Granby Street in Norfolk, Virginia, USA were also named after him. So too were two forts, Fort Granby, in Tobago, and Fort Granby in South Carolina.

He died before his father, and therefore did not become Duke.

=== Subsidiary titles ===
The subsidiary titles of the dukedom are: Marquess of Granby (created 1703), Earl of Rutland (1525), Baron Manners, of Haddon in the County of Derby (1679), and Baron Roos of Belvoir, of Belvoir in the County of Leicester (1896). The title Baron Roos of Belvoir is in the Peerage of the United Kingdom; the remaining titles being in the Peerage of England. The most senior subsidiary title, Marquess of Granby, is the courtesy title used by the Duke's eldest son and heir.

== Estates and residences ==
=== Family seats ===
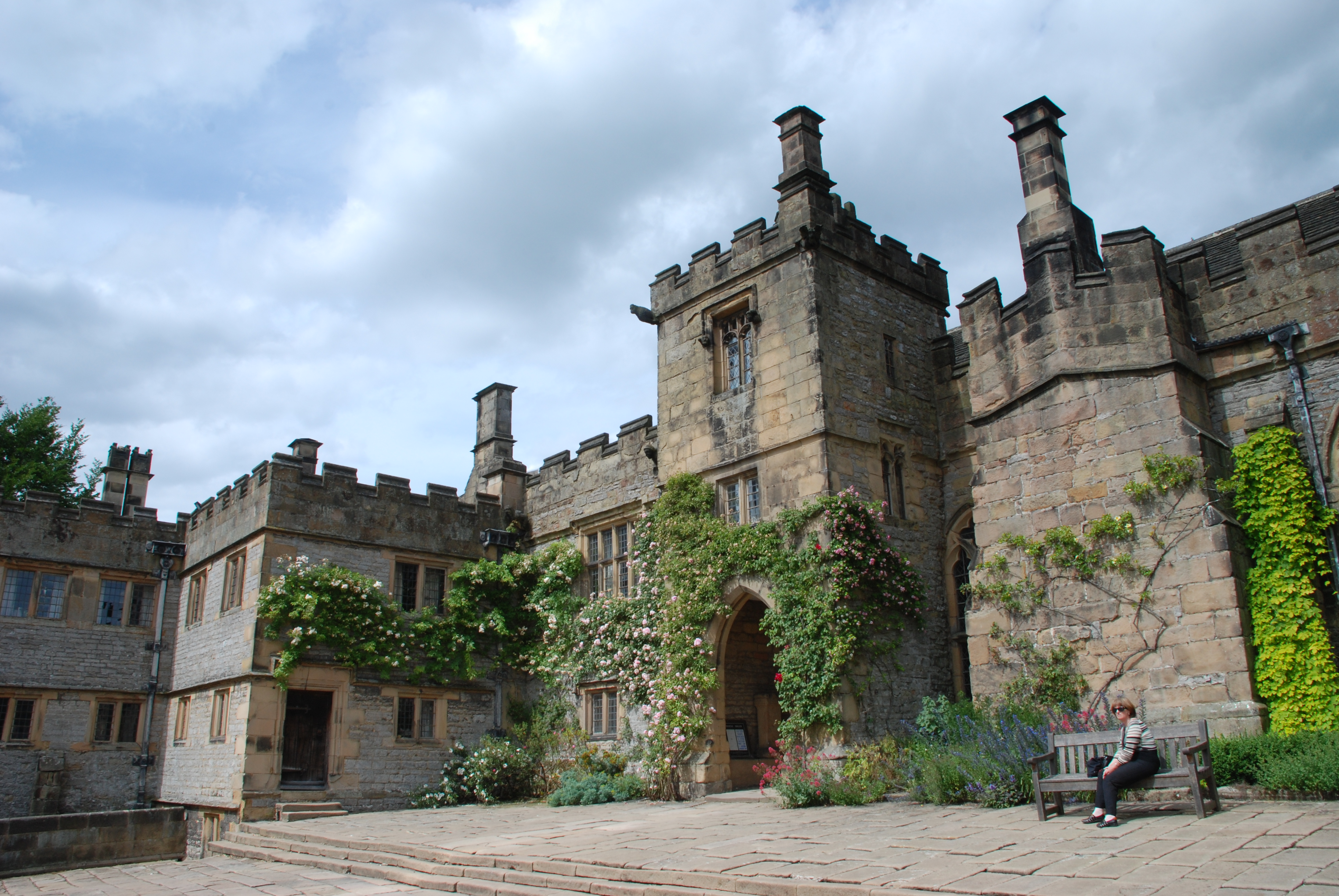
Haddon Hall, Nether Haddon, Derbyshire

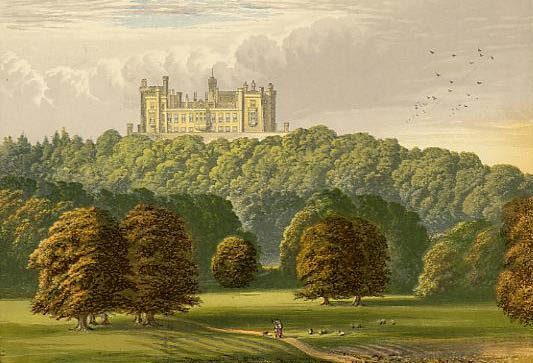
Belvoir Castle in the late 19th century

The Manners family own medieval Haddon Hall, Derbyshire and Belvoir Castle, Leicestershire that were successively extended and rebuilt until the 19th century. Some rooms in both buildings are open to the public. They are Grade I in architecture, set in listed parks, woodland and gardens and span a central water feature, which acted as models for other landscaped estates.

In 2009, to mark 500 years of the occupancy of Belvoir Castle by the family, two aircraft from RAF Cranwell, Lincolnshire, bore the Duke's coat of arms. On 11 June 2009, the Duke visited the station to see the aircraft: a King Air from 45 (Reserve) Sqn and a Dominie from 55 (Reserve) Sdn.

=== Estates ===
In the 1883 edition of John Bateman's The Great Landowners of Great Britain and Ireland, Charles Manners, 6th Duke of Rutland's estates were recorded as spanning 70,137 acres across England, including 30,188 acres in Leicestershire, 27,069 acres in Derbyshire, 6,585 acres in Cambridgeshire, 2,837 acres in Lincolnshire, 1,591 acres in Suffolk, 1,103 acres in Nottinghamshire, and 764 acres in Rutland, which produced a combined annual income of £97,486.

=== London residences ===
Prior to his elevation to the Dukedom of Rutland, John Manners, Lord Roos, occupied a house in Great Queen Street, near Lincoln's Inn Fields from Sir William Hartopp. The house may have stood on the site which is now No. 68 Great Queen Street. Following his death in 1711 he was succeeded by his son John Manners, 2nd Duke of Rutland; he had married Catherine Manners in 1693, who was a granddaughter of the 1st Duke of Bedford, and prior to Catherine's death the couple sometimes resided at Catherine's family's London mansion, Southampton House, Bloomsbury. Catherine, Duchess of Rutland died in childbirth at Southampton House during the months following her husband's succession, and he was later remarried in 1713 to Lucy Sherard, daughter of Bennet Sherard, 2nd Baron Sherard. The 2nd Duke died in 1721, and he was succeeded by his son by his first wife John Manners, 3rd Duke of Rutland.

By 1747, the 3rd Duke has established his London residence in Albemarle Street, Mayfair. In 1752 the 3rd Duke purchased the leasehold of approximately seven acres at Well Fields, Knightsbridge, opposite Hyde Park, at an annual rent of £30. He subsequently erected a substantial mansion which was known as Rutland House, possibly to designs by John Vardy. The 3rd Duke died at Rutland House, Knightsbridge in May 1779; he had been predeceased by his eldest son John Manners, Marquess of Granby, who had died in 1770, and so was succeeded by his grandson Charles Manners, 4th Duke of Rutland.

The 4th Duke maintained Rutland House, Knightsbridge as his London residence. Rutland House survived the 4th Duke's death in 1787 and remained associated with the Manners family into the nineteenth century. Following the death of Fursan Manners, the property was offered for auction on 27 August 1835, but failed to attract a purchaser. The mansion was demolished in January 1836, and its grounds were subsequently redeveloped to form Rutland Gate.

The 4th Duke's son John Manners, 5th Duke of Rutland purchased a large townhouse at No. 16 Arlington Street, St James's in 1816, which became known as Rutland House. Each successive Duke subsequently maintained their London household at Rutland House until the death of Henry Manners, 8th Duke of Rutland in 1925. His interest in the house was inherited by his widow, Violet Manners, Duchess of Rutland, although she did not occupy the property after her husband’s death. In March 1934 Violet sold 16 Arlington Street to the Royal Over-Seas League for £70,000; during her widowhood her London home was No. 34 Chapel Street, Belgravia.

Their son John Manners, Marquess of Granby had leased a detached London house at 87 Avenue Road, Regent’s Park from 1920, and continued to use this house as his London residence after he succeeded as the 9th Duke of Rutland in 1925. In May 1937 the 9th Duke and his wife Kathleen Manners, Duchess of Rutland vacated the house at Avenue Road and established their London household at No. 5 Audley Square, Mayfair. The 9th Duke died in 1940, and his widow Kathleen later sold No. 5 Audley Square in early 1944.

By 1947 their son Charles Manners, 10th Duke of Rutland had purchased the freehold of a London townhouse at No. 12 Chesterfield Street, Mayfair. He continued to occupy this house until 1954. The 10th Duke sold 12 Chesterfield Street in June 1955, by which time he had purchased a 7-room duplex apartment in Belgrave Place, Belgravia which he maintained as his London residence for several decades. By 1989 the Duke’s apartment in Belgravia Place was being rented out to tenants.

=== Burials ===
The traditional burial place of the Manners family was St Mary the Virgin's Church, Bottesford in Leicestershire. Since elevation to the dukedom in 1703 most Dukes have been buried in the grounds of the mausoleum at Belvoir Castle. The mausoleum at Belvoir Castle was built by John Henry Manners, 5th Duke of Rutland, following the death of his wife, Elizabeth Howard (1780–1825), daughter of the 5th Earl of Carlisle. After its construction, most of the 18th-century monuments in Belton Church were moved to the mausoleum which then became the family's main place of burial.

== Earls of Rutland, first creation (1390) ==
Other titles (1st Duke): Duke of York (1385), Duke of Aumale (1397–1399), Earl of Cambridge (1362–1461), Earl of Cork (c. 1396)

- Edward of Norwich, 2nd Duke of York (1373–1415), grandson of Edward III

== Earls of Rutland, second creation (1446) ==
- Edmund, Earl of Rutland (1443–1460), second son of Richard Plantagenet, 3rd Duke of York

== Earls of Rutland, third creation (1525) ==
Other titles (1st–3rd & 6th Earls): Baron de Ros of Helmsley (1299)

- Thomas Manners, 1st Earl of Rutland (c. 1492–1543), son of George Manners, 11th Baron de Ros
- Henry Manners, 2nd Earl of Rutland (c. 1526–1563), eldest son of the 1st Earl
- Edward Manners, 3rd Earl of Rutland (1549–1587), elder son of the 2nd Earl, died without male issue
- John Manners, 4th Earl of Rutland (c. 1552–1588), younger son of the 2nd Earl
- Roger Manners, 5th Earl of Rutland (1576–1612), eldest son of the 4th Earl, died without issue
- Francis Manners, 6th Earl of Rutland, Lord Ros (1578–1632), second son of the 4th Earl, died without male issue
- George Manners, 7th Earl of Rutland (1580–1641), third son of the 4th Earl, died without issue
- John Manners, 8th Earl of Rutland (1604–1679), great-grandson of the 1st Earl
- John Manners, 9th Earl of Rutland (1638–1711), son of the 8th Earl, created Duke of Rutland in 1703

== Dukes of Rutland (1703) ==
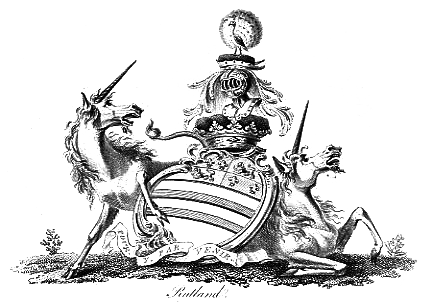
Coat of arms of the Dukes of Rutland (1790)

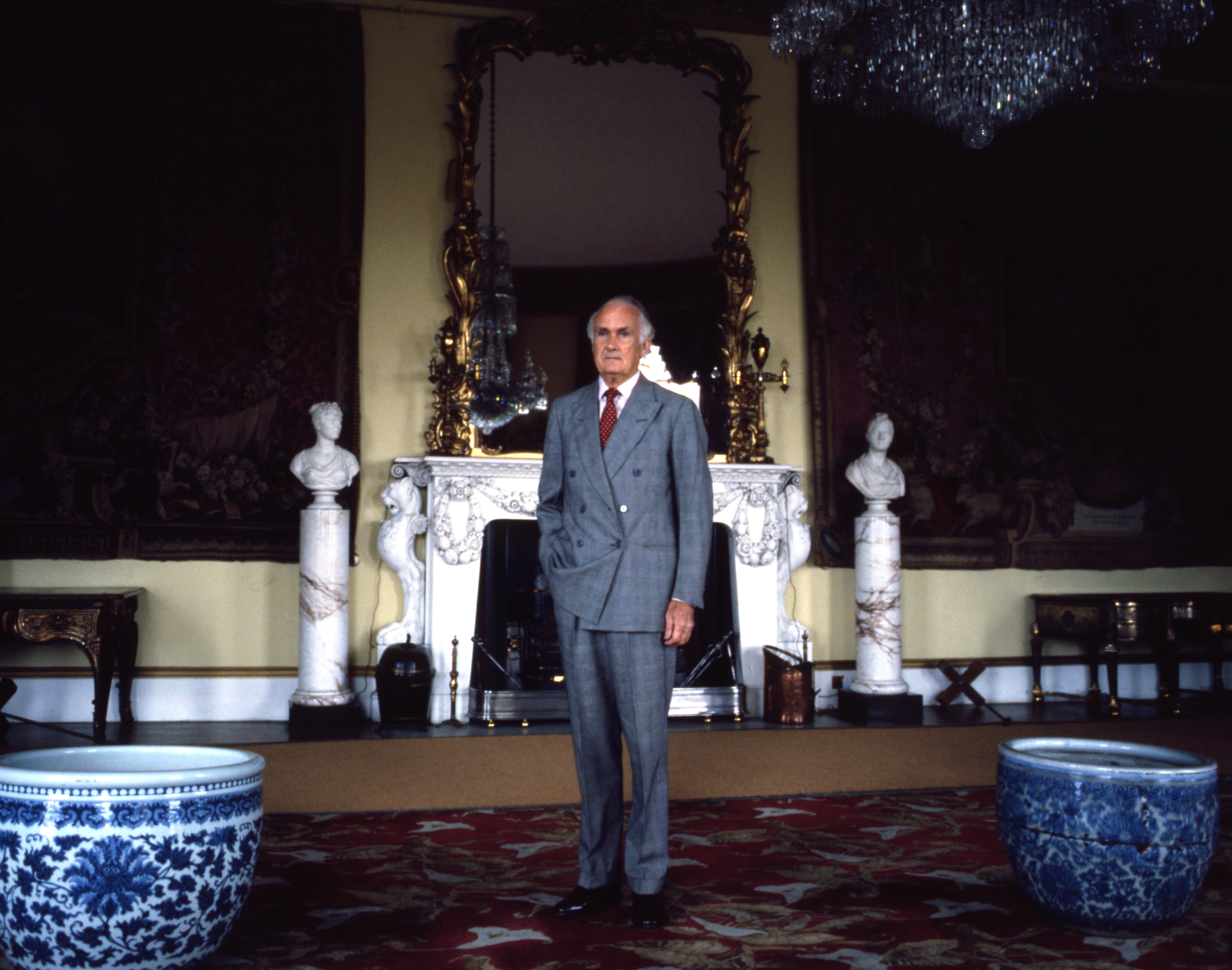
Photo portrait of the 10th Duke of Rutland, taken at Belvoir Castle in 1981 by Allan Warren

Other titles: Marquis of Granby (1703), Earl of Rutland (1525), Baron Manners of Haddon (1679) and Baron Roos of Belvoir (1896)

- John Manners, 1st Duke of Rutland (1638–1711), only son of the 8th Earl
- John Manners, 2nd Duke of Rutland (1676–1721), son of the 1st Duke
- John Manners, 3rd Duke of Rutland (1696–1779), eldest son of the 2nd Duke
  - John Manners, Marquess of Granby (1721–1770), eldest son of the 3rd Duke, predeceased his father
  - John Manners, Lord Roos (1751–1760), eldest son of Lord Granby, died young
- Charles Manners, 4th Duke of Rutland (1754–1787), second son of Lord Granby
- John Henry Manners, 5th Duke of Rutland (1778–1857), eldest son of the 4th Duke
  - George John Henry Manners, Marquis of Granby (1807), eldest son of the 5th Duke, died in infancy
  - George John Frederick Manners, Marquis of Granby (1813–1814), second son of the 5th Duke, died in infancy
- Charles Cecil John Manners, 6th Duke of Rutland (1815–1888), third son of the 5th Duke, died unmarried
- John James Robert Manners, 7th Duke of Rutland (1818–1906), fourth son of the 5th Duke
- Henry John Brinsley Manners, 8th Duke of Rutland (1852–1925), eldest son of the 7th Duke
  - Robert Charles John Manners, Lord Haddon (1885–1894), elder son of the 8th Duke, died young
- John Henry Montagu Manners, 9th Duke of Rutland (1886–1940), younger son of the 8th Duke
- Charles John Robert Manners, 10th Duke of Rutland (1919–1999), eldest son of the 9th Duke
- David Charles Robert Manners, 11th Duke of Rutland (born 1959), eldest son of the 10th Duke

The heir apparent is Charles John Montague Manners, Marquess of Granby (born 1999), elder son of the 11th Duke.

Line of succession (simplified)
- John Manners, 3rd Duke of Rutland (1696–1779)
  - John Manners, Marquess of Granby (1721–1770)
    - John Manners, Lord Roos (1751–1760)
    - Charles Manners, 4th Duke of Rutland (1754–1787)
      - John Manners, 5th Duke of Rutland (1778–1857)
        - George Manners, Marquess of Granby (1807)
        - George Manners, Marquess of Granby (1813–1814)
        - Charles Manners, 6th Duke of Rutland (1815–1888)
        - John Manners, 7th Duke of Rutland (1818–1906)
          - Henry Manners, 8th Duke of Rutland (1852–1925)
            - Robert Manners, Lord Haddon (1885–1894)
            - John Manners, 9th Duke of Rutland (1886–1940)
              - Charles Manners, 10th Duke of Rutland (1919–1999)
                - David Manners, 11th Duke of Rutland (b. 1959)
                  - (1) Charles Manners, Marquess of Granby (b. 1999)
                  - (2) Lord Hugo Manners (b. 2003)
                - (3) Lord Edward Manners (b. 1965)
                  - (4) Alfred Manners (b. 2013)
                  - (5) Vesey Manners (b. 2013)
              - Lord John Manners (1922–2001)
                - male issue in remainder
  - Lord George Manners-Sutton (1723–1783)
    - John Manners-Sutton (1752–1826)
      - The Revd Frederick Manners Sutton (1784–1826)
        - The Revd William Manners-Sutton (1824–1899)
          - Frederick Manners-Sutton (1865–1946)
            - John Manners-Sutton (1914–2003)
              - male issue in remainder
    - Thomas Manners-Sutton, 1st Baron Manners (1756–1842)
      - Barons Manners

== Coat of arms ==
The original coat of arms of the Manners family had a chief of plain gules. The quartered chief, with the fleurs-de-lis of France and lion passant guardant of England, was granted as an augmentation by King Henry VIII to Thomas Manners at the time of his creation as Earl of Rutland, in recognition of his descent in the maternal line from King Edward III.

Coat of arms of Duke of Rutland
Coronet A Coronet of a Duke Crest On a Chapeau Gules turned up Ermine a Peacock in its pride proper Escutcheon Or two Bars Azure a Chief quarterly of the last and Gules, in the first and fourth, two Fleur-de-lis, and in the second and third, a Lion passant guardant, all Or Supporters On either side a Unicorn Argent armed, maned, tufted and unguled Or Motto Pour Y Parvenir ("So as to accomplish it")

== Family tree ==
Family tree of the Dukes of Rutland, Marquesses of Granby, Earls of Rutland, Viscounts Canterbury, and Barons de Ros

Robert de Ros before 1237–1285
Baron Ros (later de Ros) of Helmsley, 1264
William Ros (Roos) c. 1255–1317; 1st Baron Ros 1299–1316
William Ros (Roos) c. 1285–1343; 2nd Baron Ros 1317–1342	Edward III; 1312–1377; King of England
Henry Percy c. 1321–1368; Baron Percy	William Ros; 1329–before 1352; 3rd Baron Ros 1342–1352	Thomas Ros; 1335–1384; 4th Baron Ros 1352–1384	John FitzAlan c. 1348–1379; Baron Arundel	Edmund of Langley; 1341–1402; Duke of York
Earl of Rutland (1st creation), 1390
Mary de Percy	John Ros d. 1393; 5th Baron Ros 1384–1393	William de Ros c. 1370–1414; 6th Baron Ros 1394–1414	Margaret; 1372–1439	Edward of Norwich; 1373–1415; Duke of York, Earl of Rutland	Richard of Conisburgh; 1375–1415; Earl of Cambridge
Earldom title disused, 1415
Earl of Rutland (1st creation), restored 1425
John Ros c. 1397–1421; 7th Baron Ros 1414–1421	Thomas Ros; 1406–1430; 8th Baron Ros 1421–1430	Richard of York; 1411–1460; Duke of York
Earl of Rutland (2nd creation), 1446
Thomas Ros; 1427–1464; 9th Baron Ros 1430–1464	Anne of York; 1439–1476; Duchess of Exeter	Edward IV; 1442–1483; King of England	Edmund; 1443–1460; Earl of Rutland	Richard III; 1452–1485; King of England
Barony forfeit 1464	Earldom extinct, 1460
Barony restored 1485
Robert Manners d. 1495	Eleanor Ros d. 1487	Edmund Ros c. 1455–1508; 10th Baron Ros 1485–1508
Barony abeyant, 1508
Barony abeyance terminated, c. 1512
George Manners c. 1470–1513; 11th Baron Ros c. 1512–1513	Anne St Leger; 1476–1526
Earl of Rutland (3rd creation), 1525
Thomas Manners c. 1492–1543; 1st Earl of Rutland, 12th Baron de Ros
Henry Manners c. 1516–1563; 2nd Earl of Rutland, 13th Baron de Ros	John Manners; 1527–1611
Edward Manners; 1549–1587; 3rd Earl of Rutland, 14th Baron de Ros	John Manners c. 1552–1588; 4th Earl of Rutland	George Manners c. 1572–1623
Elizabeth Cecil c. 1572–1591; 15th Baroness Ros; 1587–1591	Roger Manners; 1576–1612; 5th Earl of Rutland	Francis Manners; 1578–1632; 6th Earl of Rutland, 17th Baron de Ros; 1618–1632	George Manners; 1580–1641; 7th Earl of Rutland	Frances Manners; 1588–1643
William Cecil; 1590–1618; Earl of Exeter; 16th Baron Ros; 1591–1618	Katherine Manners; 1590–d. 1649; Duchess of Buckingham, 18th Baroness de Ros; 1632–1649	Francis Willoughby; 1614–1666; Baron Willoughby of Parham	John Manners; 1604–1679; 8th Earl of Rutland
Baron Manners of Haddon, 1679; Duke of Rutland and Marquess of Granby, 1703
George Villiers; 1628–1687; Duke of Buckingham, 19th Baron de Ros; 1649–1687	Elizabeth Jones c. 1633–1695; Countess of Ranelagh	John Manners; 1638–1711; 1st Duke of Rutland, etc., 9th Earl of Rutland
Barony de Ros abeyant, 1687
Frances Coningsby d. 1715; Countess Coningsby	John Manners; 1676–1721; 2nd Duke of Rutland, etc., 10th Earl of Rutland
Frances (Coningsby) Hanbury Williams; 1707/8–1781	John Manners; 1696–1779; 3rd Duke of Rutland, etc., 11th Earl of Rutland
Charlotte (Hanbury Williams) Boyle-Walsingham; 1738–1790	John Manners; 1721–1770 styled Marquess of Granby	Lord George Manners-Sutton; 1723–1783
Baron de Ros, abeyance terminated, 1806	Baron Manners of Foston, 1807
Charlotte FitzGerald-de Ros; 1769–1831; 20th Baroness de Ros; 1806–1831	John Manners; 1751–1760 styled Lord Roos	Charles Manners; 1754–1787; 4th Duke of Rutland, etc., 12th Earl of Rutland	Charles Manners-Sutton; 1755–1828	Thomas Manners-Sutton; 1756–1842; 1st Baron Manners; 1807–1842
Viscount Canterbury and Baron Bottesford, 1835
Henry FitzGerald-de Ros; 1793–1839; 21st Baron de Ros; 1831–1839	William FitzGerald-de Ros; 1797–1874; 22nd Baron de Ros; 1839–1874	John Henry Manners; 1778–1857; 5th Duke of Rutland, etc., 13th Earl of Rutland	Charles Manners-Sutton; 1780–1845; 1st Viscount Canterbury, etc. 1835–1845
Baron Roos of Belvoir, 1896
Henry FitzGerald-de Ros; 1827–1907; 23rd Baron de Ros; 1874–1907	Charles Cecil John Manners; 1815–1888; 6th Duke of Rutland, etc., 14th Earl of Rutland	John James Robert Manners; 1818–1906; 7th Duke of Rutland, etc., 15th Earl of Rutland, 1st Baron Roos	Charles John Manners-Sutton; 1812–1869; 2nd Viscount Canterbury, etc. 1845–1869	John Henry Thomas Manners-Sutton; 1814–1877; 3rd Viscount Canterbury, etc. 1869–1877	John Manners-Sutton; 1818–1864; 2nd Baron Manners; 1842–1864
Mary Dawson; 1854–1939; Countess of Dartrey; 24th Baroness de Ros; 1907–1939	Henry John Brinsley Manners; 1852–1925; 8th Duke of Rutland, etc., 16th Earl of Rutland, 2nd Baron Roos	Henry Manners-Sutton; 1839–1914; 4th Viscount Canterbury, etc. 1877–1914	Graham Edward Henry Manners-Sutton	John Manners-Sutton; 1852–1927; 3rd Baron Manners; 1864–1927
Barony abeyant, 1939
Barony abeyance terminated, 1943
Una Mary Ross; 1879–1956; 25th Baroness de Ros; 1943–1956	Robert Charles John Manners; 1885–1894 styled Lord Haddon	John Henry Montagu Manners; 1886–1940; 9th Duke of Rutland, etc., 17th Earl of Rutland, 3rd Baron Roos	Henry Frederick Walpole Manners-Sutton; 1879–1918; 5th Viscount Canterbury, etc. 1914–1918	Charles Graham Manners-Sutton; 1872–1941; 6th Viscount Canterbury, etc. 1918–1941	Francis Henry Manners; 1897–1972; 4th Baron Manners; 1927–1972
Barony abeyant, 1956	Viscountcy extinct, 1941
Barony abeyance terminated, 1958
Georgiana Angela Maxwell; 1933–1983; 26th Baroness de Ros; 1958–1983	Charles John Robert Manners; 1919–1999; 10th Duke of Rutland, etc., 18th Earl of Rutland, 4th Baron Roos	John Robert Cecil Manners; 1923–2008; 5th Baron Manners; 1972–2008
Peter Trevor Maxwell b. 1958; 27th Baron de Ros; 1938–present	David Charles Robert Manners b. 1959; 11th Duke of Rutland, etc., 19th Earl of Rutland, 5th Baron Roos	John Hugh Robert Manners b. 1956; 6th Baron Manners; 2008–present
Finbar James Maxwell b. 1988	Charles John Montague Manners b. 1999 styled Marquess of Granby	John Alexander David Manners b. 2011

== See also ==
- Duchess of Rutland
- Viscount Canterbury
- Belvoir Castle
- Baron Manners
- Baron de Ros
- Manners family pubs
