= David Manners, 11th Duke of Rutland =

British hereditary peer and landowner (born 1959)

His Grace The Duke of Rutland
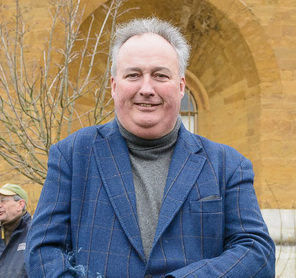
- The 11th Duke in 2015
- Tenure: 4 January 1999 – present
- Predecessor: Charles Manners, 10th Duke of Rutland
- Born: David Charles Robert Manners; 8 May 1959 (age 67)
- Residence: Belvoir Castle
- Spouse: Emma Watkins (m. 1992; sep. 2012)
- Issue: Violet Lindesay-Bethune, Countess of Lindsay; Lady Alice Manners; Lady Eliza Manners; Charles Manners, Marquess of Granby; Lord Hugo Manners
- Heir: Charles Manners, Marquess of Granby
- Parents: Charles Manners, 10th Duke of Rutland; Frances Sweeny

David Charles Robert Manners, 11th Duke of Rutland (born 8 May 1959), is a British hereditary peer and landowner.

== Biography ==
Rutland is the elder son of the 10th Duke of Rutland by his second wife, the former Frances Sweeny. He was educated at Stanbridge Earls School, near Romsey in Hampshire, which has since closed. He succeeded his father in the titles on 4 January 1999. He has a younger brother, Lord Edward Manners, a sister, Lady Teresa Manners, and a half-sister, Lady Charlotte Manners.

Rutland's ancestral home is Belvoir Castle in the northern part of Leicestershire. The Sunday Times Rich List 2013 estimated his personal fortune at £125 million, but he had to sell a painting to keep Belvoir Castle maintained.

The Duke was a high-profile supporter of the UK Independence Party (UKIP) and has hosted fundraising events at Belvoir Castle. He has stood in six House of Lords by-elections from 2005 to 2016.

In the summer of 2005, Rutland bought the Manners Arms Country Hotel and Restaurant in Knipton near Grantham, which had been built for the 6th Duke of Rutland as a hunting lodge during the 1880s. The Duchess took a leading part in the renovation work they carried out on the property.

The Duke was briefly a member of the House of Lords from January 1999, when his father died, to November 1999, when he was excluded under the House of Lords Act 1999.

== Marriage and issue ==
Manners married Emma Watkins, daughter of a Welsh farmer from Knighton, Powys, on 6 June 1992 at Belvoir Castle. The couple first met at a dinner party; she was initially unaware that he was the heir to a dukedom.

The family first lived in the adjacent Knipton Lodge, a six-bedroomed Georgian house. Following the death of the 10th Duke, they moved into newly renovated private apartments in 2001 which had formerly been the nanny's residence.

The couple has five children:

- Violet Lindesay-Bethune, Countess of Lindsay (born 18 August 1993), married in 2025, William Lindesay-Bethune, 17th Earl of Lindsay;
- Lady Alice Louisa Lilly Manners (born 27 April 1995);
- Lady Eliza Charlotte Manners (born 17 July 1997);
- Charles John Montague Manners, Marquess of Granby (born 3 July 1999);
- Lord Hugo William James Manners (born 24 July 2003).

Although they separated in 2012, they continue to cohabitate, each having their own living quarters at Belvoir Castle, which has 356 rooms.

The Duchess runs the commercial activities of Belvoir Castle, including shooting parties, weddings and a furniture range.

== Controversies ==
In 2016 the Duke was banned from driving for a year after amassing 24 points on his licence. The Duke was caught speeding twice in Nottinghamshire, once in North Yorkshire and again in Derbyshire in an eight-month period. He was also ordered to pay £3,025 in fines and costs. The Duke did not appear at the hearing.

In July 2018 the Duke came under scrutiny for advertising positions for actors to perform unpaid at Belvoir Castle. Performers' union Equity criticised the advertisement, saying it was "unacceptable" to ask actors to work unpaid; the advertisement was later removed.

In October 2023 the Duke was widely criticised for burning a significant amount of moorland on his land surrounding Sheffield. The incident caused a major local air pollution incident and created calls for the burning of moors for grouse shooting to be outlawed. The Mayor of South Yorkshire, Oliver Coppard, described the incident as: "a moment of real anger and concern". The Duke "expressed his regret that so many fires had been set on the day in question and that lots of smoke had drifted across Sheffield", but did not attend or send a representative to the investigatory event organised for the following year.

== Books ==
The Duke has published the following book, under the name "David Rutland":

- Resolution: Two Brothers. A Nation in Crisis. A World at War (2017), co-written with Emma Ellis.

== Coat of arms ==
Coat of arms of David Manners, 11th Duke of Rutland
| Coronet A Coronet of a Duke Crest On a Chapeau Gules turned up Ermine a Peacock in its pride proper Escutcheon Or two Bars Azure a Chief quarterly of the last and Gules, in the first and fourth, two Fleur-de-lis, and in the second and third, a Lion passant guardant, all Or Supporters On either side a Unicorn Argent armed, maned, tufted and unguled Or Motto Pour Y Parvenir ("So as to accomplish it") |

Peerage of England
| Preceded by Charles Manners | Duke of Rutland; 1999–present | Incumbent |
Orders of precedence in the United Kingdom
| Preceded by The Duke of Marlborough | Gentlemen; The Duke of Rutland | Succeeded by The Duke of Hamilton |
