= Charles Manners, 10th Duke of Rutland =

British peer and landowner

His Grace The Duke of Rutland CBE JP DL
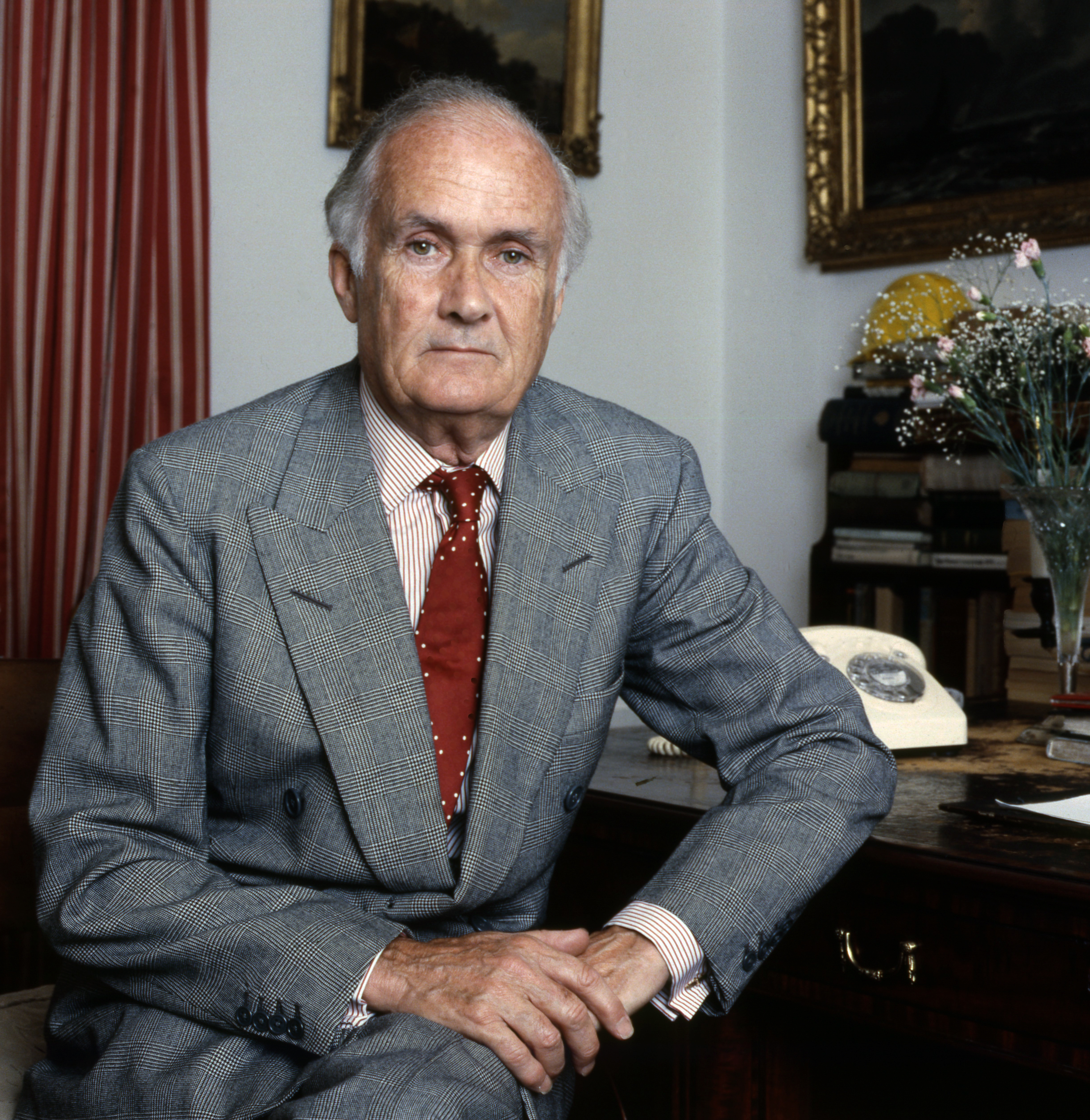
- Photographed by Allan Warren

Personal details
- Born: Charles John Robert Manners; 28 May 1919
- Died: 4 January 1999 (aged 79)
- Spouses: Anne Bairstow Cumming Bell (m. 1946; div. 1956) Frances Helen Sweeny (m. 1958)
- Children: 5, including David
- Parent(s): John Manners, 9th Duke of Rutland; Kathleen Tennant

Charles John Robert Manners, 10th Duke of Rutland, CBE, JP, DL (28 May 1919 – 4 January 1999), styled Marquess of Granby until 1940, was a British peer, landowner and Conservative local politician who chaired Leicestershire County Council.

== Biography ==
He was the son of John Manners, 9th Duke of Rutland, and his wife Kathleen Tennant, granddaughter of Sir Charles Tennant, 1st Baronet. Rutland was educated at Eton and Trinity College, Cambridge. He was a younger brother of Lady Ursula d'Abo and Lady Isabel Manners.

He served in the British Army during the Second World War, becoming a captain in the Grenadier Guards.

He succeeded his father as Duke of Rutland in 1940 and held the title until his death in 1999. His inheritance included the farming estate.

== Public life ==
A lifelong Conservative, the Duke represented the Vale of Belvoir Division on Leicestershire County Council from 1945 until 1985, and was the council's chairman from 1974 until 1977. Beyond the county council, he chaired a regional economic planning council and held positions with a range of charities and other public organisations. He was also a justice of the peace and a deputy lieutenant.

He was appointed a Commander of the Order of the British Empire in the 1962 New Year Honours "for political and public services in the East Midlands".

== Marriages and issue ==
The Duke was married twice.

- On 27 April 1946 he married Anne Bairstow Cumming Bell (died 2002), daughter of William Cumming Bell and Joan Middlemost Cumming Bell, née Bairstow. They had one daughter before divorcing in 1956:
  - Lady Charlotte Louise Manners (7 January 1947 – 15 March 2023)
- On 15 May 1958 he married Frances Helen Sweeny, whose parents were Charles Francis Sweeny, an American amateur golfer, socialite and businessman, and his first wife, the Scottish-born heiress Margaret Whigham. Margaret had become Duchess of Argyll in 1951 through her second marriage, to Ian Douglas Campbell, 11th Duke of Argyll. The couple had four children, two sons and a daughter of whom were living in the mid-1980s:
  - David Charles Robert Manners, 11th Duke of Rutland (born 8 May 1959), eldest son and heir.
  - Lord Robert George Manners (18 June 1961 – 28 February 1964), who died aged two.
  - Lady (Helen) Theresa (Margaret) Manners (born 11 November 1962), who as a young woman sang lead vocals for the short-lived 1980s British rock band "The Business Connection", founded by Henry Somerset, Marquess of Worcester (later 12th Duke of Beaufort). She married Dr John Chipman, director of the International Institute for Strategic Studies.
  - Lord Edward (John Francis) Manners (born 29 May 1965), who married Gabrielle Ross in 2013.

== Coat of arms ==
Coat of arms of Charles Manners, 10th Duke of Rutland
Coronet A Coronet of a Duke Crest On a Chapeau Gules turned up Ermine a Peacock in its pride proper Escutcheon Or two Bars Azure a Chief quarterly of the last and Gules, in the first and fourth, two Fleur-de-lis, and in the second and third, a Lion passant guardant, all Or Supporters On either side a Unicorn Argent armed, maned, tufted and unguled Or Motto Pour Y Parvenir ("So as to accomplish it")

Peerage of England
Preceded by John Manners	Duke of Rutland; 1940–1999	Succeeded by David Manners
