= Belvoir Castle =

Stately home in Leicestershire, England

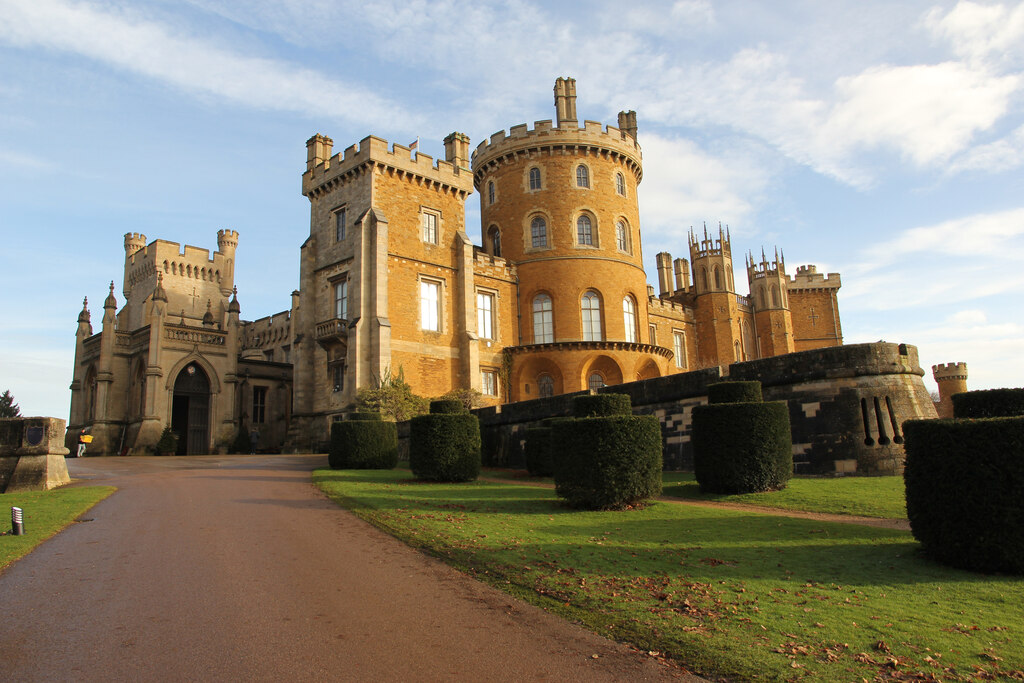
- Belvoir Castle in 2023

- Location within Leicestershire

General information
- Architectural style: Gothic Revival
- Location: Northeast Leicestershire, England
- Coordinates: 52°53′40.2″N 0°46′57.22″W
- Elevation: 138 metres (453 ft)
- Groundbreaking: 1067
- Renovated: 1801–1832
- Owner: David Manners, 11th Duke of Rutland

Design and construction
- Architect: James Wyatt
- Designations

Listed Building – Grade I
- Designated: 14 July 1953
- Reference no.: 1360870

Website
- belvoircastle.com

Belvoir Castle (/ˈbiːvər/ BEE-vər) is a faux historic castle and stately home in Leicestershire, England, situated 6 mi (10 km) west of the town of Grantham and 10 mi (16 km) north-east of Melton Mowbray. A castle was first built on the site immediately after the Norman Conquest of 1066 and has since been rebuilt at least three times. The final building is a grade I listed mock castle, dating from the early 19th century. It is the seat of David Manners, 11th Duke of Rutland (the tiny county of Rutland lies 16 mi (26 km) south of Belvoir Castle), whose direct male ancestor inherited it in 1508. The traditional burial place of the Manners family was in the parish church of St Mary the Virgin, Bottesford, situated 3 mi (5 km) to the north of the Castle, but since 1825 they have been buried in the ducal mausoleum built next to the Castle in that year, to which their ancient monuments were moved. It remains the private property of the Duke of Rutland but is open to the general public.

The castle is situated at the extreme northern corner of the county of Leicestershire and is sandwiched between Lincolnshire to the east and Nottinghamshire to the west, and overlooks the Vale of Belvoir to the northwest on the Nottinghamshire border. It is surrounded by the villages of Redmile, Woolsthorpe, Knipton, Harston, Harlaxton, Croxton Kerrial, Muston and Bottesford. The antiquarian John Leland (d.1552) stated: "the Castle stands on the very nape of a high hill, steep up each way, partly by nature, partly by the working of men's hands".

The 15,000 acre (6,000 hectare) Belvoir estate, situated in the heart of England's fox-hunting terrain is the headquarters of the Belvoir Hunt ("the Duke of Rutland's Hounds"), established in 1750 and now kennelled 0.6 mi (1 km) southeast of the Castle.

== Name ==
The castle's name Belvoir means beautiful view in Norman French. Emma Manners, Duchess of Rutland has said the name Belvoir was brought over by the French-speaking Normans in the 11th century. As the Middle English–speaking Anglo-Saxons were unable to pronounce the name, they preferred to call it "Beaver Castle" – a usage which persists today.

== History ==
=== Norman fortification ===
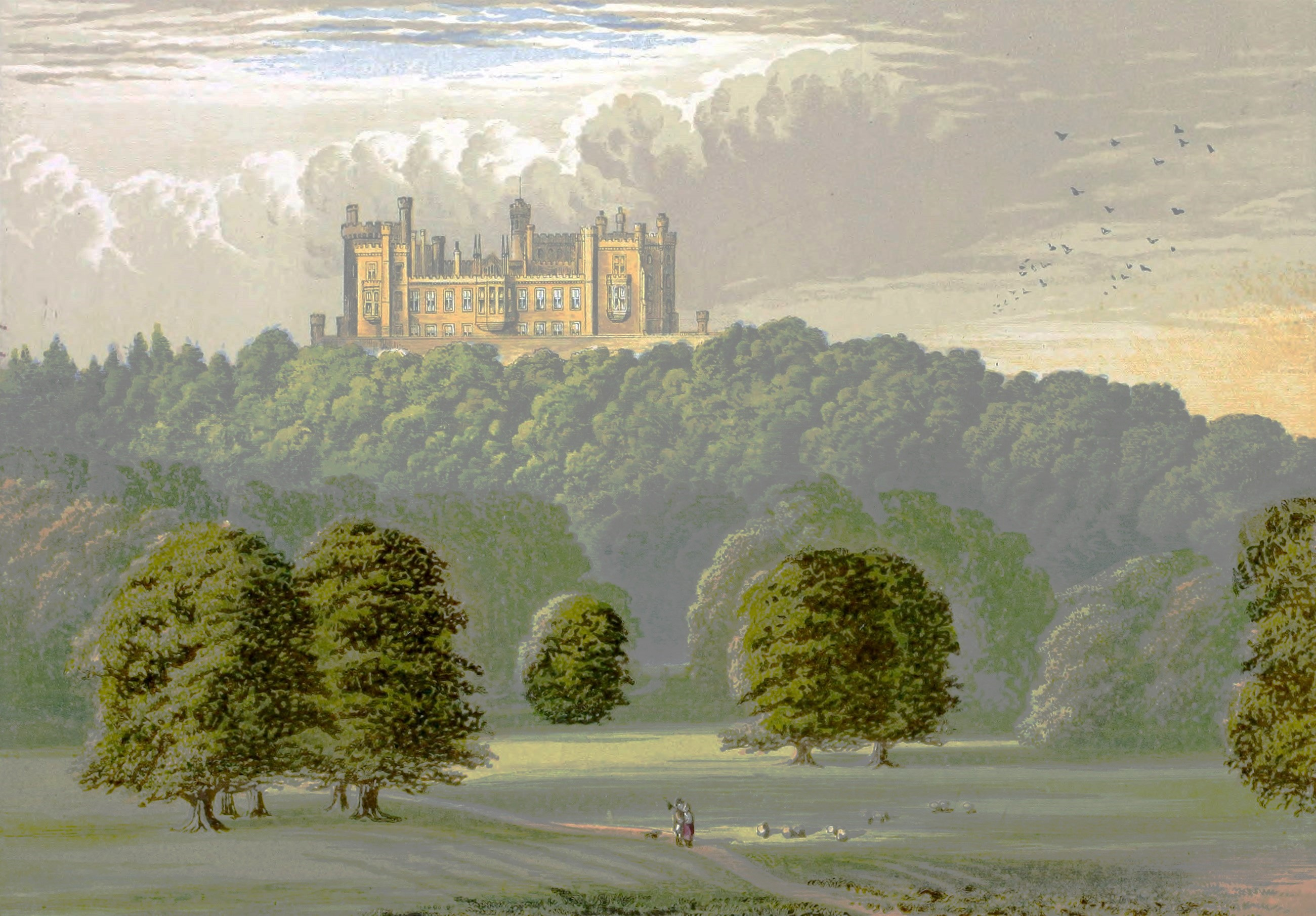
Belvoir Castle in the late 19th century

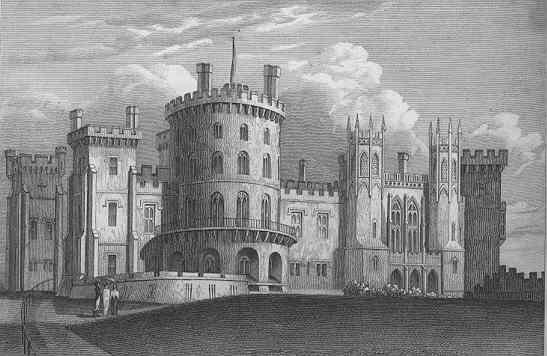
The southwest range and round tower of Belvoir Castle from Jones' Views of the seats of Noblemen and Gentlemen, published in 1829. Barring minor details, this image depicts the castle as it remains today.

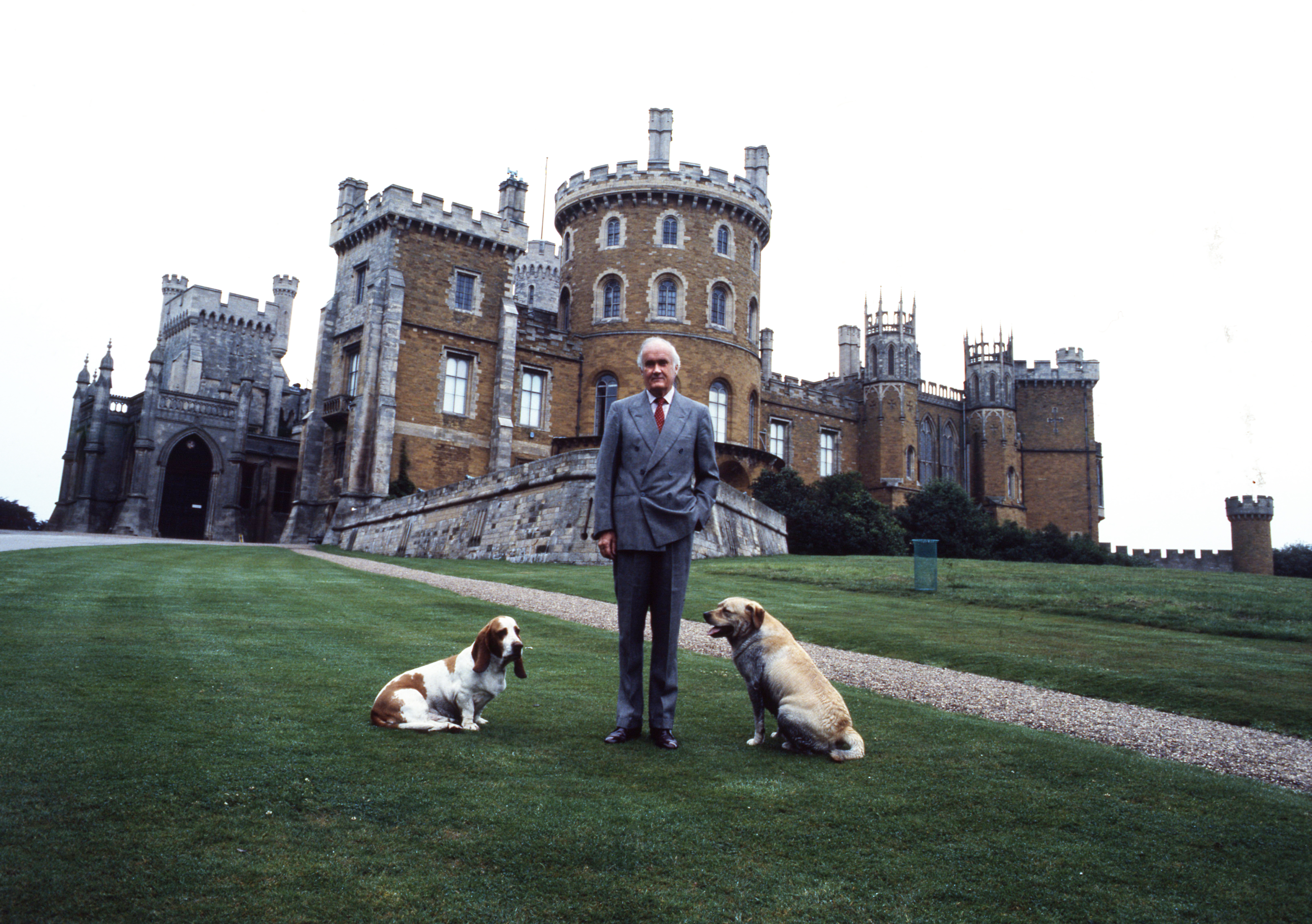
The 10th Duke outside Belvoir Castle, by Allan Warren (late 1990s)

A Norman castle originally stood on the high ground within the wapentake of Framland, overlooking the adjacent wapentake of Winnibriggs in Lincolnshire and dominating both. It was built on the land of Robert de Todeni, mentioned in the Domesday Book of 1086, and inherited from him by William d'Aubigny. It eventually passed to William's granddaughter Isabel, who married Robert de Ros c. 1234.

Belvoir was a royal manor until it was granted to Robert de Ros in 1257. He was given a licence to crenellate in 1267. When the male de Ros line died out in 1508, the manor and castle passed to George Manners, 11th Baron de Ros, nephew of the last baron de Ros, who inherited the castle and barony through his mother. His son was created Earl of Rutland in 1525.

=== Tudor manor ===
By 1464, the Norman castle was recorded to be ruins. In 1528, Thomas Manners, 1st Earl of Rutland started construction of a large Tudor manor house. It was completed in 1555. Much of the stone for this building came from Croxton Abbey and Belvoir Priory following their dissolution.

Two local carpenters refurbished the billiard table in 1602 and a new baize cloth was bought from a merchant in Grantham. Tents were brought to Belvoir to accommodate the retinue of James VI and I in April 1603, and new ovens were constructed. Prince Henry and the Venetian ambassador Antonio Foscarini stayed in August 1612. In the early 17th century, servants Joan, Margaret and Phillipa Flower were accused of murdering the 6th Earl's two young sons by witchcraft. Joan died while in prison and Margaret and Phillipa were hanged.

During the English Civil War, it was one of the more notable strongholds of the king's supporters and King Charles spent a night here on his way into Lincolnshire.

=== Country house ===
In 1649, the Tudor building was razed by Parliamentarians because of the family's support for the Royalists. But six years later, construction on a large family home - designed by the architect John Webb - was started in 1654. Work was completed by 1668 and cost £11,730 (£2.42 million today).

The 9th Earl was created Duke of Rutland in 1703. Belvoir Castle has been the home of the Manners family for five hundred years and seat of the Dukes of Rutland for over three centuries.

=== Georgian revival ===
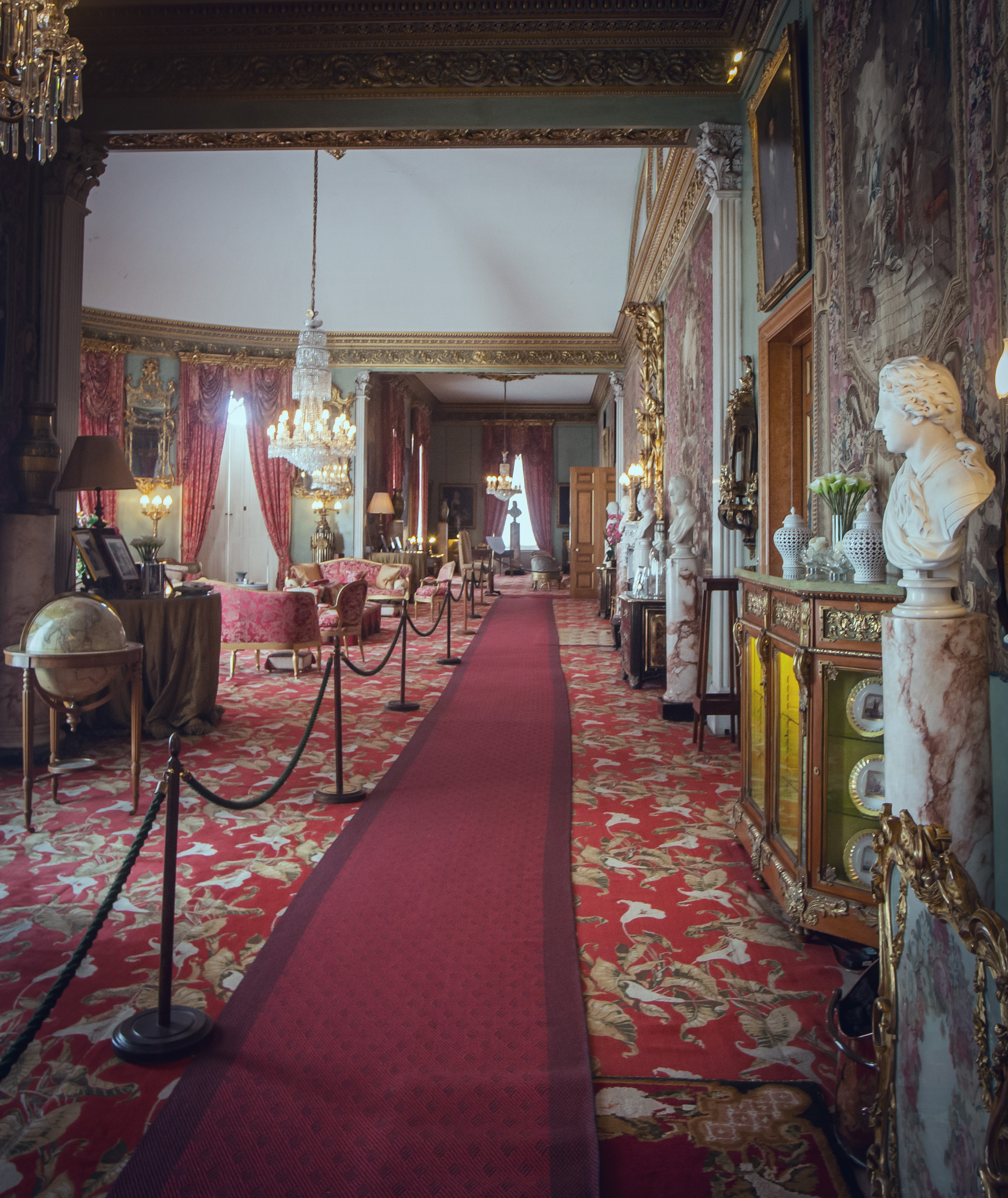
The Drawing Room

In 1799, the 5th Duke of Rutland married Lady Elizabeth Howard. The new Duchess of Rutland soon chose architect James Wyatt to rebuild the castle in the romantic Gothic Revival style. The Duke, one of the wealthiest landholders in the United Kingdom, sold seven assorted villages and their surrounding lands to fund the massive project. The project was nearing completion when, on 26 October 1816, it was almost destroyed by a fire. The loss - including pictures by Titian, Rubens, van Dyck, and Reynolds - was estimated at £120,000 (£10.11 million today).

Rebuilt, again, to largely the same designs, at a cost of an additional £82,000 (£7.94 million today), the castle was largely completed by 1832. The architect Sir James Thornton (who was the Duke's friend and chaplain and Vicar of nearby Bottesford) was chiefly responsible for this rebuilding, and the result bears a superficial resemblance to a medieval castle, its central tower reminiscent of Windsor Castle.

Whilst visiting Belvoir castle in the 1840s, Anna, Duchess of Bedford, found that the normal time for dinner was between 7:00 and 8:30 p.m. An extra meal called luncheon had been created to fill the midday gap between breakfast and dinner, but as this new meal was very light, the long afternoon with no refreshment at all left people feeling hungry. She found a light meal of tea (usually Darjeeling) and cakes or sandwiches was the perfect balance. The Duchess found taking an afternoon snack to be such a perfect refreshment that she soon began inviting her friends to join her. Afternoon tea quickly became an established and convivial repast in many middle and upper class households.

The castle is open to the public and contains many works of art. The highlights of the tour are the lavish state rooms, the most famous being the Elizabeth Saloon (named after the wife of the 5th Duke), the Regent's Gallery and the Roman-inspired State Dining Room.

The Queen's Royal Lancers regimental museum of the 17th and 21st Lancers was established here in 1964, but was required to leave in October 2007. The Royal Lancers and Nottinghamshire Yeomanry Museum is now at Thoresby Hall.

== Estate ==
The castle sits in an estate of almost 15,000 acres (61 km^{2}).

=== Gardens ===
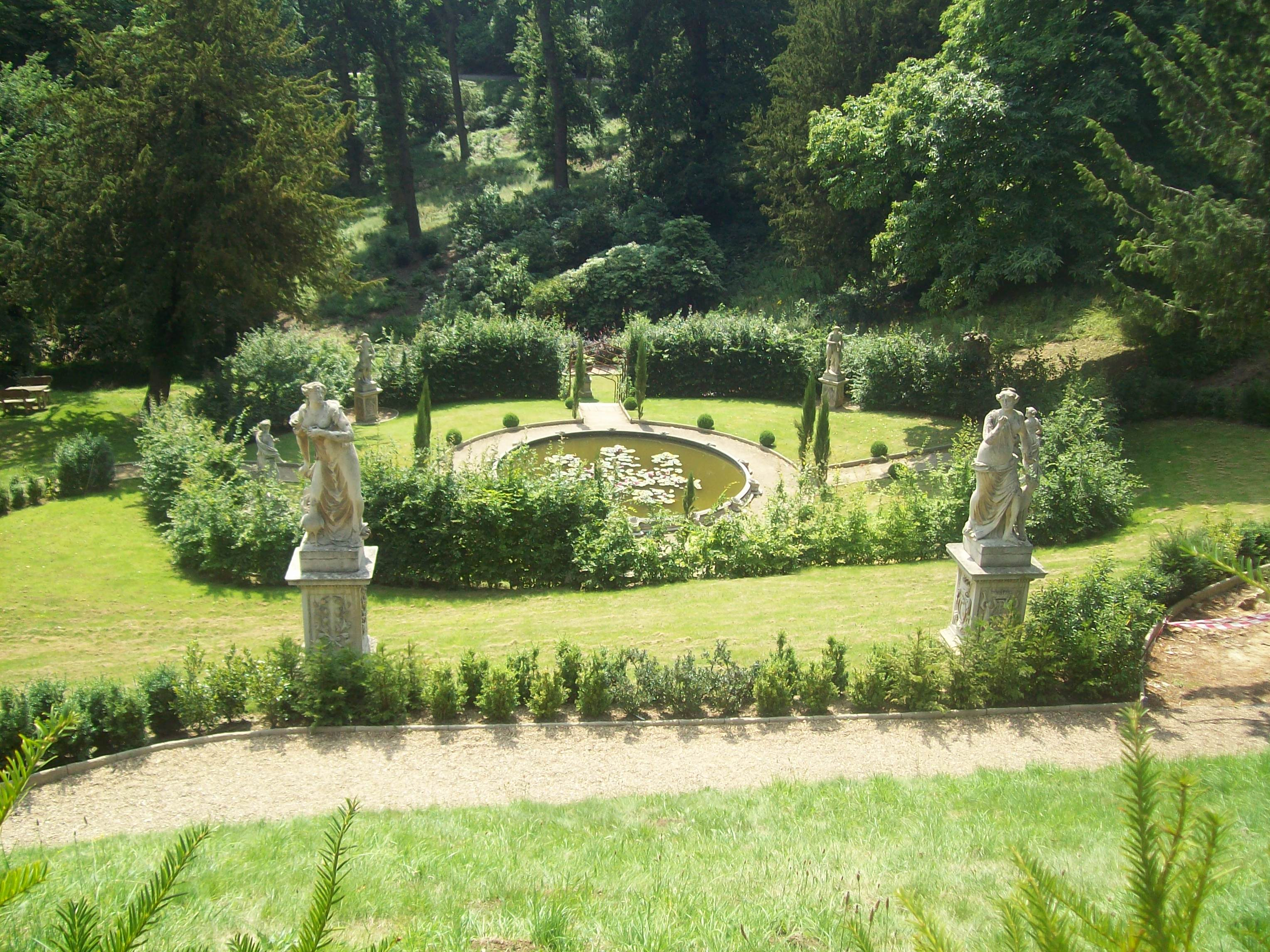
Belvoir Gardens

Belvoir Gardens were designed and landscaped by Elizabeth Howard, 5th Duchess of Rutland, who was married to John Manners, the 5th Duke of Rutland. They were created in 1799, the year Belvoir Castle was built. There are many unusual features to the gardens, for example the natural amphitheatre which faces the estate was formed by the moraines of glaciers and a 'root house' or summer house which survives to this day. This natural amphitheatre is embedded with fresh water springs to ensure blooming plants throughout the year.

Belvoir Gardens were also the first site of mass spring flower bedding, a concept developed by Mr Divers, head gardener at the time.

The once-thriving gardens are now slowly being restored with the help of "Friends of Belvoir Gardens", a programme for volunteer helpers.

== Mausoleum ==
The traditional burial place of the Manners family was St Mary the Virgin's Church, Bottesford, which houses the monuments of all eight Earls of Rutland. Since elevation to the dukedom in 1703 most Dukes have been buried in the grounds of the mausoleum at Belvoir Castle. The mausoleum at Belvoir Castle was built by The 5th Duke of Rutland, following the death of his wife, Elizabeth Howard (1780–1825), daughter of The 5th Earl of Carlisle. After its construction, most of the 18th century monuments in Bottesford church were moved to the mausoleum which then became the family's main place of burial.

=== Burials ===
The following members of the Manners family are buried in the mausoleum:

- John Manners, 1st Duke of Rutland
- John Manners, 2nd Duke of Rutland
- John Manners, 3rd Duke of Rutland
- Charles Manners, 4th Duke of Rutland
- John Manners, 5th Duke of Rutland
- Violet Manners, Duchess of Rutland
- Duff Cooper, 1st Viscount Norwich, son-in-law of the 8th Duke
- Diana Cooper, Viscountess Norwich
- Charles Manners, 10th Duke of Rutland

== In literature ==
- Letitia Elizabeth Landon's poem Belvoir Castle.—Seat of the Duke of Rutland. is inscribed to Lady Emmeline Stuart-Wortley, daughter of John Manners, 5th Duke of Rutland. The poem illustrates a painting by Thomas Allom.
- In 2012, Catherine Bailey published a history of Belvoir Castle chronicling a mystery surrounding one of its occupants, John Manners, the 9th Duke of Rutland, which she encountered and worked to unravel while researching in the estate's archives.

== Present use ==
A portion of the castle is used as the family home of the Manners family.

=== Filming locations ===
The castle has been used as a location for films and television programmes including Little Lord Fauntleroy (1980), Young Sherlock Holmes (1985), King Ralph (1991), the 1999 version of The Haunting, Rosie and Jim (1999), Jack and the Beanstalk: The Real Story (2001), The Da Vinci Code (2006), The Young Victoria (2007), The Crown and The Diplomat (2026).

=== Estate activities ===
For ten years, the estate operated a ten-bedroom hotel in a former hunting lodge, established to support estate shoots and events. It closed after recording a loss of £250,000. In 2019, a retail village opened below the castle, with all units run by independent tenants; one unit, a butcher's shop, sells beef produced on the estate. From late 2024, The Manners Arms, a Grade II listed hotel and public house in Knipton, underwent refurbishment, including work on the bar, dining area and ten bedrooms.

The grounds are used by Belvoir Cricket Club. In 2009, they hosted the CLA Game Fair. Since 2013, except in 2020 when it did not take place because of Covid-19 restrictions, the Equinox24, a 24-hour ultra marathon, has been held around the autumnal equinox over a 10-kilometre (6.2 mi) circuit through the estate. In July 2026, the ninth Flower and Garden Show was held in the grounds.

Each year on New Year's Day, a charity walk is held in aid of Dove Cottage Day Hospice, with routes that include a three-mile circuit through parkland originally designed by Capability Brown. In 2021, a Regency-themed Christmas event was held, and in 2025 the castle opened to the public at Christmas for the first time in two years. In November 2025, following complaints about traffic delays, parking and the length of the annual fireworks display, which had been held in a new area of the estate, the castle stated that it would review the event.

=== Exhibitions ===
In 2023, robes worn at the coronation of George VI in 1937 were displayed at the castle for the first time in 22 years. They were made for the ninth Duke of Rutland and were also worn by the tenth Duke at the coronation of Elizabeth II in 1953. In early 2025, an exhibition, The Motherhood, covered the women who have lived at the castle over 500 years and included clothing worn by past duchesses.

=== Grounds and other events ===
In August 2010, the castle's website was hacked by an Algerian group, who blanked its pages and inserted antisemitic text in Arabic. The group had misidentified the castle as Belvoir Fortress in Israel. In November 2014, Emma Manners, Duchess of Rutland, appointed Timothy Grayson as the castle's poet-in-residence. Briery Wood Heronry, a biological Site of Special Scientific Interest, lies within the grounds.

== See also ==
- Belvoir disambiguation page
- List of castles in Leicestershire
- Treasure Houses of Britain, 1985 TV documentary filmed in part at Belvoir Castle
