= Viscount Canterbury =

Title in the Peerage of the United Kingdom

Viscountcy Canterbury
- Quarterly, 1st & 4th: Argent, a canton sable (Sutton) 2nd & 3rd: Or, two bars azure, a chief quarterly azure and gules, the 1st and 4th quarters charged with two fleurs-de-lis or, and the 2nd and 3rd a lion of England (Manners)
- Creation date: 10 March 1835
- Created by: King William IV
- Peerage: Peerage of the United Kingdom
- First holder: Sir Charles Manners-Sutton
- Last holder: Charles Manners-Sutton, 6th Viscount Canterbury
- Remainder to: Heirs male of the 1st Viscount's body lawfully begotten
- Subsidiary titles: Baron Bottesford
- Extinction date: 26 February 1941
- Seats: Brooke House; Dickeburge-Manclere; Great Witchingham Hall
- Motto: Pour y parvenir ("In order to accomplish")

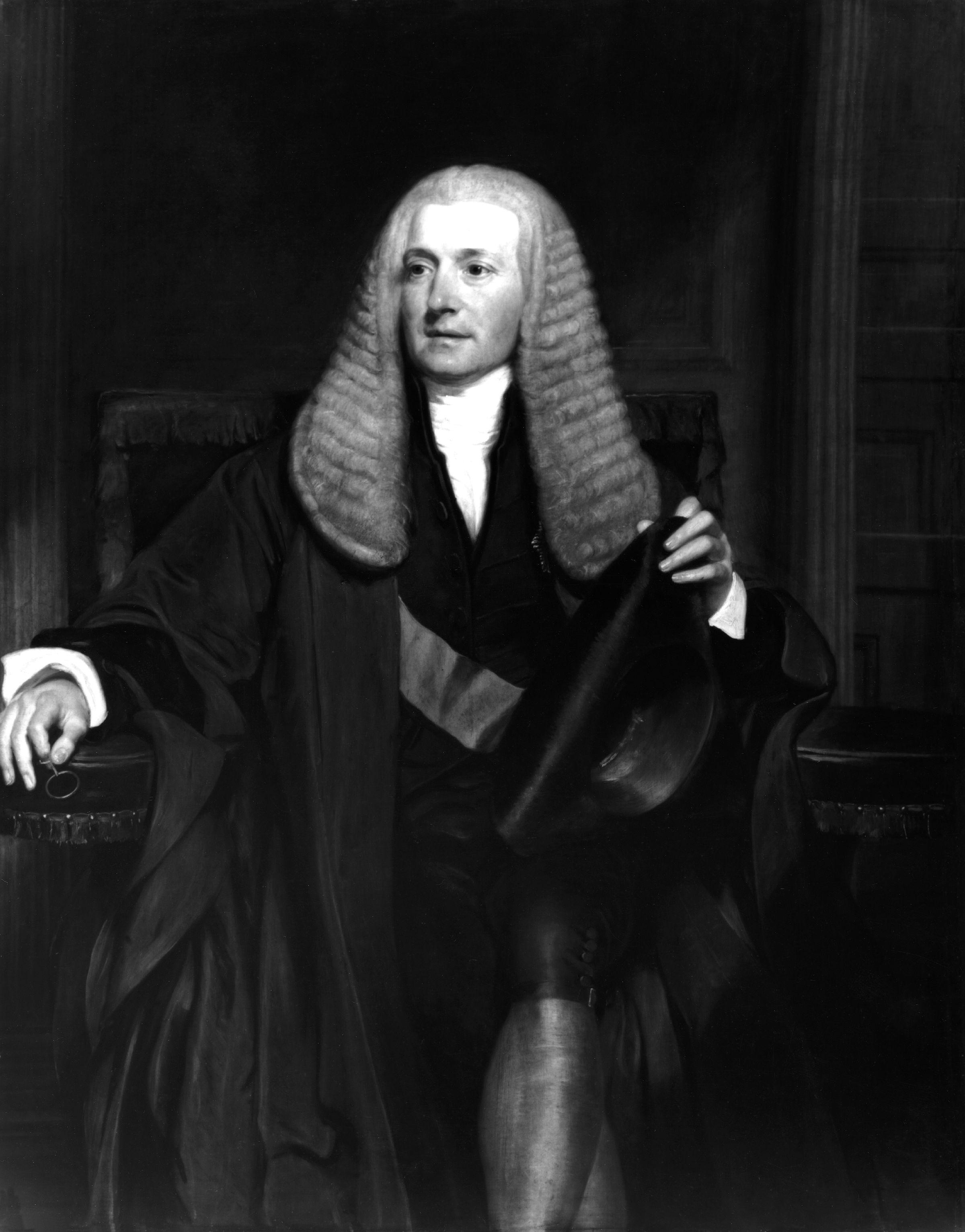
Charles Manners-Sutton, 1st Viscount Canterbury.

Viscount Canterbury, of the City of Canterbury, was a title in the Peerage of the United Kingdom. It was created in 1835 for the Tory politician Sir Charles Manners-Sutton, who had previously served as Speaker of the House of Commons. He was created Baron Bottesford, of Bottesford in the County of Leicester, at the same time, also in the Peerage of the United Kingdom. Manners-Sutton was the son of the Most Reverend Charles Manners-Sutton, Archbishop of Canterbury, fourth son of Lord George Manners-Sutton, third son of John Manners, 3rd Duke of Rutland. His uncle was Thomas Manners-Sutton, 1st Baron Manners, Lord Chancellor of Ireland.

Lord Canterbury was succeeded by his eldest son, the second Viscount. He died unmarried and was succeeded by his younger brother. He was a politician and colonial administrator. The titles descended from father to son until the death of his grandson, the fifth Viscount, in 1918. The late Viscount was succeeded by his first cousin, the sixth Viscount. He was the son of the Hon. Graham Edward Henry Manners-Sutton, younger son of the third Viscount. Lord Canterbury had no sons and on his death in 1941 both titles became extinct.

== Viscounts Canterbury (1835) ==
- Charles Manners-Sutton, 1st Viscount Canterbury (1780–1845)
- Charles John Manners-Sutton, 2nd Viscount Canterbury (1812–1869)
- John Henry Thomas Manners-Sutton, 3rd Viscount Canterbury (1814–1877)
- Henry Charles Manners-Sutton, 4th Viscount Canterbury (1839–1914)
- Henry Frederick Walpole Manners-Sutton, 5th Viscount Canterbury (1879–1918)
- Charles Graham Manners-Sutton, 6th Viscount Canterbury (1872–1941)

== Family tree ==
Family tree of the Dukes of Rutland, Marquesses of Granby, Earls of Rutland, Viscounts Canterbury, and Barons de Ros

Robert de Ros before 1237–1285
Baron Ros (later de Ros) of Helmsley, 1264
William Ros (Roos) c. 1255–1317; 1st Baron Ros 1299–1316
William Ros (Roos) c. 1285–1343; 2nd Baron Ros 1317–1342	Edward III; 1312–1377; King of England
Henry Percy c. 1321–1368; Baron Percy	William Ros; 1329–before 1352; 3rd Baron Ros 1342–1352	Thomas Ros; 1335–1384; 4th Baron Ros 1352–1384	John FitzAlan c. 1348–1379; Baron Arundel	Edmund of Langley; 1341–1402; Duke of York
Earl of Rutland (1st creation), 1390
Mary de Percy	John Ros d. 1393; 5th Baron Ros 1384–1393	William de Ros c. 1370–1414; 6th Baron Ros 1394–1414	Margaret; 1372–1439	Edward of Norwich; 1373–1415; Duke of York, Earl of Rutland	Richard of Conisburgh; 1375–1415; Earl of Cambridge
Earldom title disused, 1415
Earl of Rutland (1st creation), restored 1425
John Ros c. 1397–1421; 7th Baron Ros 1414–1421	Thomas Ros; 1406–1430; 8th Baron Ros 1421–1430	Richard of York; 1411–1460; Duke of York
Earl of Rutland (2nd creation), 1446
Thomas Ros; 1427–1464; 9th Baron Ros 1430–1464	Anne of York; 1439–1476; Duchess of Exeter	Edward IV; 1442–1483; King of England	Edmund; 1443–1460; Earl of Rutland	Richard III; 1452–1485; King of England
Barony forfeit 1464	Earldom extinct, 1460
Barony restored 1485
Robert Manners d. 1495	Eleanor Ros d. 1487	Edmund Ros c. 1455–1508; 10th Baron Ros 1485–1508
Barony abeyant, 1508
Barony abeyance terminated, c. 1512
George Manners c. 1470–1513; 11th Baron Ros c. 1512–1513	Anne St Leger; 1476–1526
Earl of Rutland (3rd creation), 1525
Thomas Manners c. 1492–1543; 1st Earl of Rutland, 12th Baron de Ros
Henry Manners c. 1516–1563; 2nd Earl of Rutland, 13th Baron de Ros	John Manners; 1527–1611
Edward Manners; 1549–1587; 3rd Earl of Rutland, 14th Baron de Ros	John Manners c. 1552–1588; 4th Earl of Rutland	George Manners c. 1572–1623
Elizabeth Cecil c. 1572–1591; 15th Baroness Ros; 1587–1591	Roger Manners; 1576–1612; 5th Earl of Rutland	Francis Manners; 1578–1632; 6th Earl of Rutland, 17th Baron de Ros; 1618–1632	George Manners; 1580–1641; 7th Earl of Rutland	Frances Manners; 1588–1643
William Cecil; 1590–1618; Earl of Exeter; 16th Baron Ros; 1591–1618	Katherine Manners; 1590–d. 1649; Duchess of Buckingham, 18th Baroness de Ros; 1632–1649	Francis Willoughby; 1614–1666; Baron Willoughby of Parham	John Manners; 1604–1679; 8th Earl of Rutland
Baron Manners of Haddon, 1679; Duke of Rutland and Marquess of Granby, 1703
George Villiers; 1628–1687; Duke of Buckingham, 19th Baron de Ros; 1649–1687	Elizabeth Jones c. 1633–1695; Countess of Ranelagh	John Manners; 1638–1711; 1st Duke of Rutland, etc., 9th Earl of Rutland
Barony de Ros abeyant, 1687
Frances Coningsby d. 1715; Countess Coningsby	John Manners; 1676–1721; 2nd Duke of Rutland, etc., 10th Earl of Rutland
Frances (Coningsby) Hanbury Williams; 1707/8–1781	John Manners; 1696–1779; 3rd Duke of Rutland, etc., 11th Earl of Rutland
Charlotte (Hanbury Williams) Boyle-Walsingham; 1738–1790	John Manners; 1721–1770 styled Marquess of Granby	Lord George Manners-Sutton; 1723–1783
Baron de Ros, abeyance terminated, 1806	Baron Manners of Foston, 1807
Charlotte FitzGerald-de Ros; 1769–1831; 20th Baroness de Ros; 1806–1831	John Manners; 1751–1760 styled Lord Roos	Charles Manners; 1754–1787; 4th Duke of Rutland, etc., 12th Earl of Rutland	Charles Manners-Sutton; 1755–1828	Thomas Manners-Sutton; 1756–1842; 1st Baron Manners; 1807–1842
Viscount Canterbury and Baron Bottesford, 1835
Henry FitzGerald-de Ros; 1793–1839; 21st Baron de Ros; 1831–1839	William FitzGerald-de Ros; 1797–1874; 22nd Baron de Ros; 1839–1874	John Henry Manners; 1778–1857; 5th Duke of Rutland, etc., 13th Earl of Rutland	Charles Manners-Sutton; 1780–1845; 1st Viscount Canterbury, etc. 1835–1845
Baron Roos of Belvoir, 1896
Henry FitzGerald-de Ros; 1827–1907; 23rd Baron de Ros; 1874–1907	Charles Cecil John Manners; 1815–1888; 6th Duke of Rutland, etc., 14th Earl of Rutland	John James Robert Manners; 1818–1906; 7th Duke of Rutland, etc., 15th Earl of Rutland, 1st Baron Roos	Charles John Manners-Sutton; 1812–1869; 2nd Viscount Canterbury, etc. 1845–1869	John Henry Thomas Manners-Sutton; 1814–1877; 3rd Viscount Canterbury, etc. 1869–1877	John Manners-Sutton; 1818–1864; 2nd Baron Manners; 1842–1864
Mary Dawson; 1854–1939; Countess of Dartrey; 24th Baroness de Ros; 1907–1939	Henry John Brinsley Manners; 1852–1925; 8th Duke of Rutland, etc., 16th Earl of Rutland, 2nd Baron Roos	Henry Manners-Sutton; 1839–1914; 4th Viscount Canterbury, etc. 1877–1914	Graham Edward Henry Manners-Sutton	John Manners-Sutton; 1852–1927; 3rd Baron Manners; 1864–1927
Barony abeyant, 1939
Barony abeyance terminated, 1943
Una Mary Ross; 1879–1956; 25th Baroness de Ros; 1943–1956	Robert Charles John Manners; 1885–1894 styled Lord Haddon	John Henry Montagu Manners; 1886–1940; 9th Duke of Rutland, etc., 17th Earl of Rutland, 3rd Baron Roos	Henry Frederick Walpole Manners-Sutton; 1879–1918; 5th Viscount Canterbury, etc. 1914–1918	Charles Graham Manners-Sutton; 1872–1941; 6th Viscount Canterbury, etc. 1918–1941	Francis Henry Manners; 1897–1972; 4th Baron Manners; 1927–1972
Barony abeyant, 1956	Viscountcy extinct, 1941
Barony abeyance terminated, 1958
Georgiana Angela Maxwell; 1933–1983; 26th Baroness de Ros; 1958–1983	Charles John Robert Manners; 1919–1999; 10th Duke of Rutland, etc., 18th Earl of Rutland, 4th Baron Roos	John Robert Cecil Manners; 1923–2008; 5th Baron Manners; 1972–2008
Peter Trevor Maxwell b. 1958; 27th Baron de Ros; 1938–present	David Charles Robert Manners b. 1959; 11th Duke of Rutland, etc., 19th Earl of Rutland, 5th Baron Roos	John Hugh Robert Manners b. 1956; 6th Baron Manners; 2008–present
Finbar James Maxwell b. 1988	Charles John Montague Manners b. 1999 styled Marquess of Granby	John Alexander David Manners b. 2011

== See also ==
- Duke of Rutland
- Baron Manners
