= William de Ros =

William de Ros may refer to:

- William de Ros, 1st Baron de Ros
- William de Ros, 2nd Baron de Ros
- William de Ros, 3rd Baron de Ros
- William de Ros, 6th Baron de Ros
- William Cecil, 17th Baron de Ros
- William FitzGerald-de Ros, 23rd Baron de Ros

== See also ==
- William Roos (disambiguation)
