= Thomas de Ros =

Thomas de Ros may refer to:

- Thomas de Ros, 4th Baron de Ros
- Thomas de Ros, 8th Baron de Ros
- Thomas de Ros, 9th Baron de Ros
- Thomas Manners, 1st Earl of Rutland (12th Baron de Ros)
