= John de Ros =

John de Ros may refer to:

- John de Ros, 5th Baron de Ros
- John de Ros, 7th Baron de Ros

== See also ==
- John Roos, American lawyer
