= John Ros =

John Ros may refer to:

- John Ros, 7th Baron Ros (c. 1397–1421)
- John Ros, 5th Baron Ros (died 1393)
