= Robert de Ros =

Robert de Ros or Robert Ros may refer to:

- Robert de Ros (died 1227), Magna Carta baron
- Robert de Ros (died 1285), ancestor of Barons de Ros
- Robert Ros, 1st Baron Ros de Werke (died c. 1297), English noble
- Sir Robert Ros (died 1448), English knight and administrator
