= Belvoir Priory =

- Location within Leicestershire

Monastery information
- Order: Benedictine
- Established: 1076
- Disestablished: 1539
- Mother house: St Albans Abbey
- Diocese: Diocese of Lincoln
- Controlled churches: Redmile, Leicestershire; Woolsthorpe-by-Belvoir, Lincolnshire

People
- Founder: Robert de Todeni

Site
- Location: Belvoir, Leicestershire, England
- Coordinates: 52.898541°N 0.781701°W

Belvoir Priory (pronounced Beaver) was a Benedictine priory near to Belvoir Castle. Although once described as within Lincolnshire, it is currently located in Leicestershire, near the present Belvoir Lodge.

== History ==
The priory was established in 1076 by Robert de Todeni, Lord of Belvoir, on land near to the castle. Unable to complete the building work due to his "secular employments", following the advice of Lanfranc, Archbishop of Canterbury, he handed the priory to the Abbot of St Albans Abbey. Belvoir priory was then developed as a cell (a small establishment dependent upon a motherhouse) for the abbey. In return for his gift, Robert de Todeni was buried within the priory's chapter house and the monks were to pray for his soul.

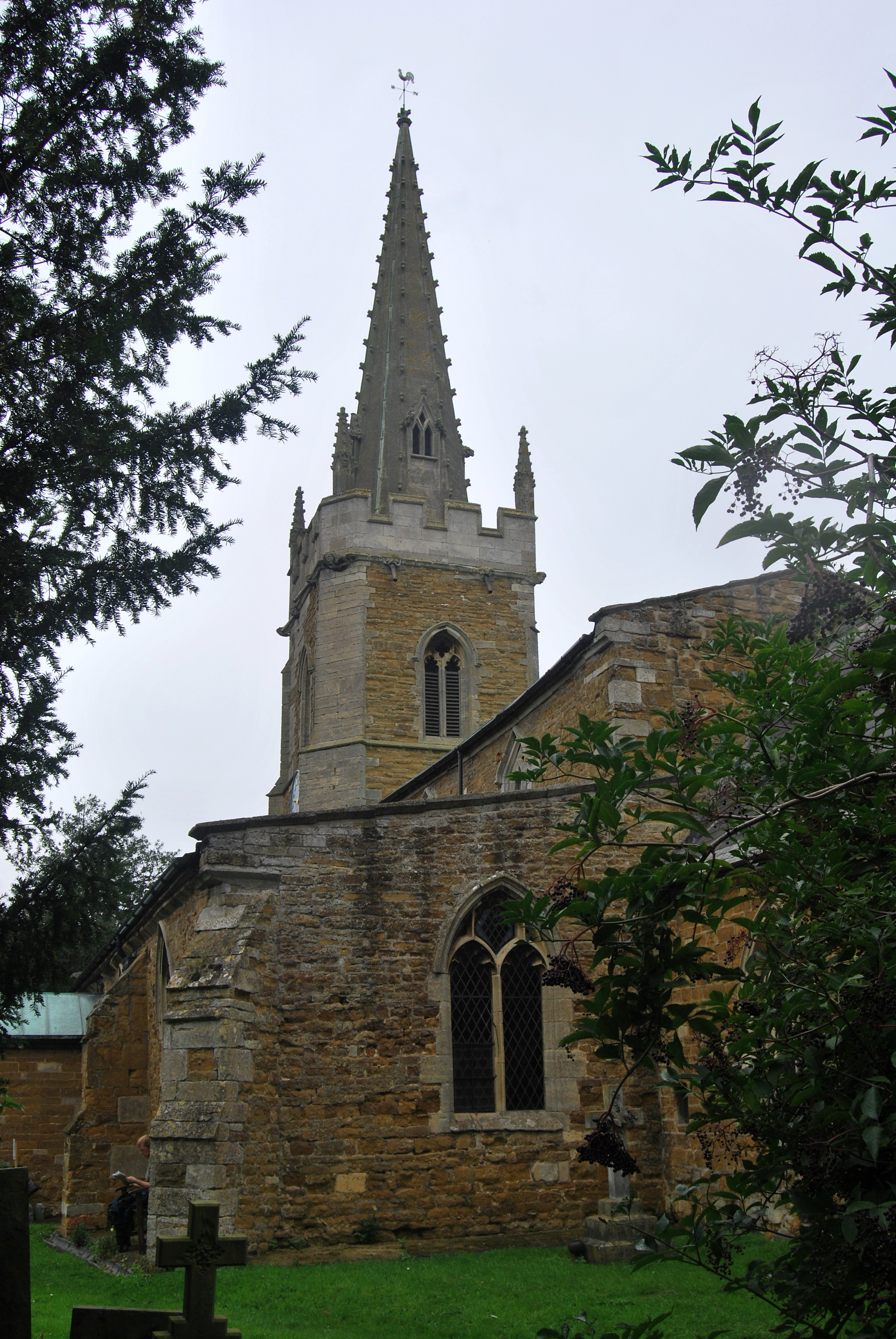
Redmile church, formerly controlled by the priory

The priory was fairly small, housing only four monks. It did, however, attract gifts and patronage; many of those making donations were, similar to its founder, buried within the priory's church or chapter house. Among these gifts were the advowsons of the churches at Redmile, gifted by William d'Albini; and of Woolsthorpe, gifted in 1308 by William de Ros, 1st Baron de Ros.

The priory's small size meant it struggled to support itself and was frequently in debt and facing poverty. As the dissolution approached the priory was no longer in debt but did not have the revenues to support any monks; the prior lived alone, visited intermittently by monks from St Albans Abbey.

At the dissolution of the monasteries, Belvoir Priory was dissolved with its motherhouse in 1539. Henry Manners, 2nd Earl of Rutland preserved "the monumental remains of his ancestors, by transferring them chiefly to Bottesford", from Belvoir and Croxton Abbey.

== Other burials ==
- William d'Aubigny (Brito)
- Robert de Todeni
- William de Ros, 6th Baron de Ros and his wife Lady Margaret Arundel Roos
- John de Ros, 7th Baron de Ros
