= William de Ros of Kendal =

English noble

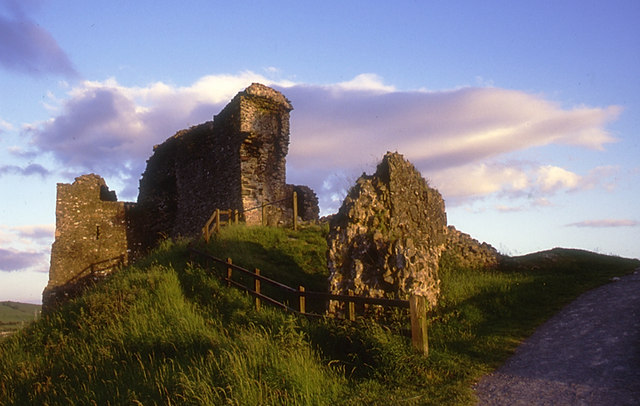
Kendal Castle, Kendal, Cumbria, England

William de Ros (died 1310), Lord of Kendal was an English noble. He fought in the wars in Scotland.

== Biography ==
William was a younger son of Robert de Ross of Wark and Margaret de Brus. He held Wark Castle, which had been in his elder brother Robert's procession, who had joined the Scots in 1296. Staying loyal to the English side, he later was captured by the Scots at the siege of Berwick in 1298 and was taken prisoner and held in Dumbarton Castle until 1299. William inherited his mother's Kendal estate. Wark was given to his cousin William Ros, 1st Baron Ros of Helmsley, after forfeiture of his older brother Robert. William died in 1310 and was succeeded by his son Thomas, by his wife Elizabeth.
