= Thomas Ros, 8th Baron Ros =

English noble (1406–1430)

- Born: 26 September 1406; Belvoir, Leicestershire
- Died: 18 August 1430 (aged 23)
- Spouse: Eleanor Beauchamp
- Issue: Thomas Ros, 9th Baron Ros; Richard Ros; Margaret Ros, Baroness Botreaux
- Father: William Ros, 6th Baron Ros
- Mother: Margaret FitzAlan

Arms of Ros: Gules, three water bougets argent

Thomas Ros or Roos, 8th Baron Ros of Helmsley (26 September 1406 – 18 August 1430) was an English peer.

== Family ==
Thomas Ros, born 26 September 1406 at Hamlake, was the second son of William Ros, 6th Baron Ros, and Margaret Fitzalan (d. 3 July 1438), the daughter of John FitzAlan, 1st Baron Arundel, by Eleanor Maltravers (c.1345 – 12 January 1405), younger daughter and coheir of Sir John Maltravers (d. 22 January 1349).

== Career ==
Thomas Ros was a younger brother of John Ros, 7th Baron Ros, who died childless at the Battle of Baugé on 22 March 1421. Thomas inherited his rank and privileges, and followed the example of his brother in participating in the Hundred Years' War. He fought in the Battle of Verneuil under the command of John, Duke of Bedford. He was honoured for his efforts, and knighted by Henry VI of England on 19 May 1426. Henry was a nephew of the Duke. Thomas resumed service under the Duke in 1427. He was summoned to the Parliament of England in 1429. In 1430, he fell into the Seine during a minor skirmish and drowned.

== Marriage and issue ==
Thomas Ros married Eleanor Beauchamp, daughter of Richard Beauchamp, 13th Earl of Warwick, and his first wife, Elizabeth Berkeley, by whom he had two sons and a daughter:

- Thomas Ros, 9th Baron Ros (9 September 1427 – 17 May 1464).
- Sir Richard Ros, who married, before 1468, Jane or Joan Knyvet, daughter of Sir John Knyvet. Note: the link is going for wrong Richard Ros, the namesake of this one, but son of 6th baron.
- Margaret Ros, who married firstly William de Botreaux, 3rd Baron Botreaux, and secondly Thomas Burgh, 1st Baron Burgh of Gainsborough.

After the death of Thomas Ros, his widow, Eleanor, married secondly, Edmund Beaufort, 1st Duke of Somerset, and thirdly, Walter Rokesley, esquire.

== Ancestry ==
Ancestors of Thomas Ros, 8th Baron Ros

8. William de Ros, 2nd Baron de Ros
4. Thomas de Ros, 4th Baron de Ros
9. Margery de Badlesmere
2. William de Ros, 6th Baron de Ros
10. Ralph de Stafford, 1st Earl of Stafford
5. Beatrice Stafford
11. Margaret de Audley
1. Thomas de Ros, 8th Baron de Ros
12. Richard Fitzalan, 10th Earl of Arundel
6. John FitzAlan, 1st Baron Arundel
13. Eleanor of Lancaster
3. Margaret FitzAlan
14. John Maltravers, 1st Baron Maltravers
7. Eleanor Maltravers, 2nd Baroness Maltravers
15. Gwenthin

Peerage of England
Preceded by John Ros	Baron Ros; 1421–1430	Succeeded by Thomas Ros
