= John Badby =

Englishman executed for Eucharist views

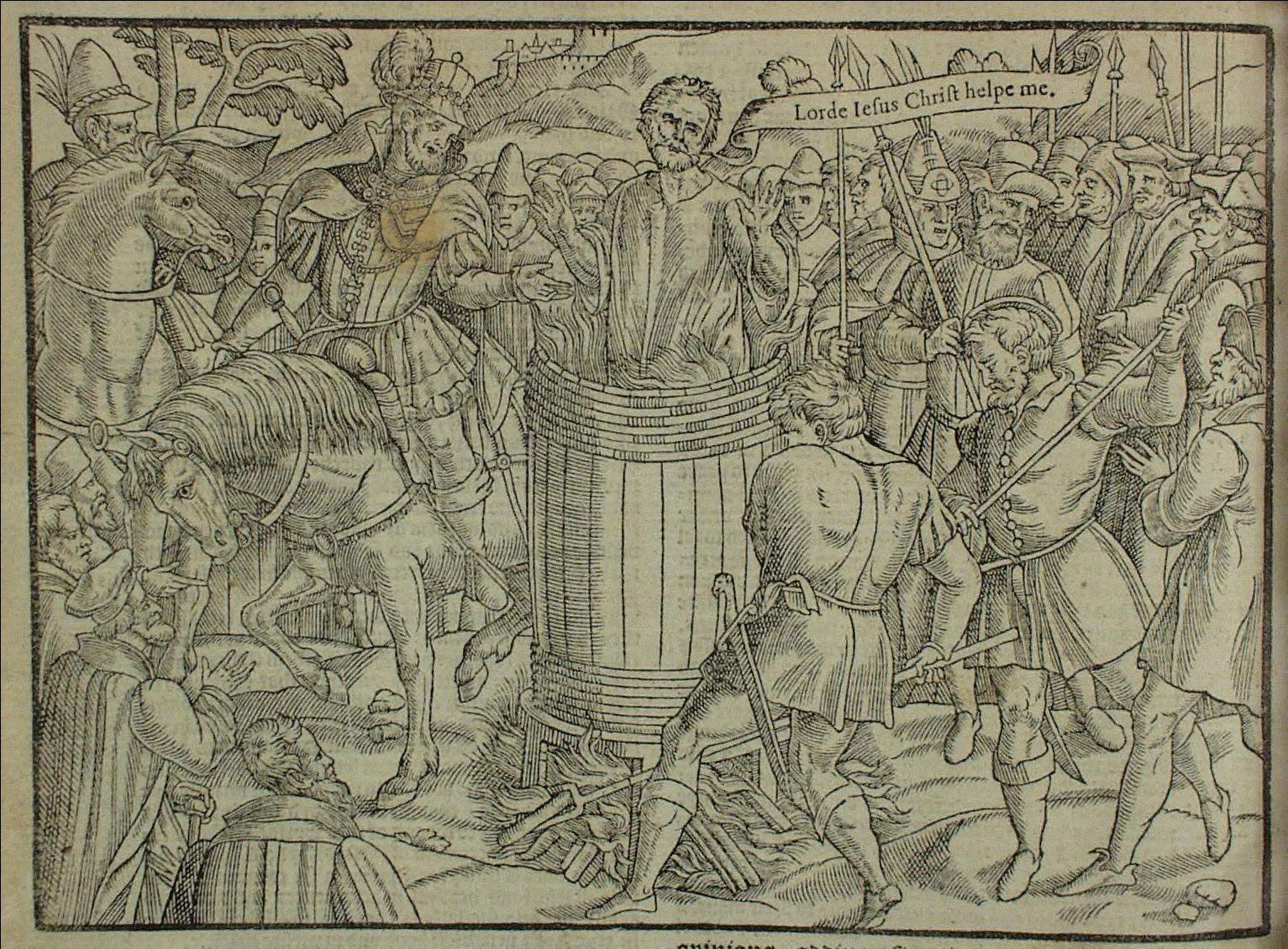
John Badby being burned to death in a barrel (from John Foxe's Book of Martyrs (1563))

John Badby (1380–1 March 1410), one of the early Lollard martyrs, was a tailor (or perhaps a blacksmith) in the west Midlands, and was condemned by the Worcester diocesan court for his denial of transubstantiation.

Badby bluntly maintained that when Christ sat at supper with his disciples he had not his body in his hand to distribute, and that "if every host consecrated at the altar were the Lord's body, then there be 20,000 Gods in England." A further court in St Paul's, London, presided over by Archbishop Thomas Arundel and his brother-in-law William, Baron de Ros, condemned him to be burned at Smithfield, the tournament ground just outside the city walls. The sentence was carried out on 1 March.

It is said that the prince of Wales (afterwards Henry V) witnessed the execution and offered the sufferer both life and a pension if he would recant; but in Walsingham's words, "the abandoned villain declined the prince's advice, and chose rather to be burned than to give reverence to the life-giving sacrament. So it befell that this mischievous fellow was burnt to ashes, and died miserably in his sin."

Narration in Foxe's Book of Martyrs:

And then was the tunne put over hym, and fire putte unto hym. And when he felt the fire, he cryed, mercy (calling belike upon the Lorde) and so the Prince immediatlye commaunded to take away the tunne, and quenche the fire. The Prince, his commaundement beyng done, asked him if he would forsake heresie to take him to the fayth of holy churche: which thing if he would doo, he shoulde have goods inough, promising also unto him a yearelye stipende out of the kinges treasury, so muche as shoulde suffice hys contentation.

But this valiant champion of Christ, neglectyng the princes fayre wordes, as also contempnyng all mennes devises: refused the offer of worldly promises, no doubt, but beyng more vehemently inflamed with the spirite of God then with any earthly desire.

Wherfore, when as yet he continued unmoveable in hys former minde, the prince commaunded him straight to be put againe into the pype or tunne, & that he should not afterward looke for any grace or favour. But as he could be allured by no rewardes, even so was he nothing at all abashed at their tormentes, but as a valiant champion of Christ, he persevered invincible to the end.

== In popular culture ==
South Korean novelist Kim Seong-han's historical novel Babido ("바비도") illustrates the martyrdom of an eponymous tailor, whose name is a mistranscription of Badby's surname.
