= Baron de Ros =

Title in the Peerage of England

Barony de Ros
- Arms of Maxwell, Barons de Ros: Quarterly, 1st and 4th: Argent, a saltire gules (Fitzgerald) 2nd and 3rd: Gules, three water bougets argent (de Ros)
- Creation date: 6 February 1288/89, with a precedence to 24 December 1264
- Created by: King Henry III
- Peerage: Peerage of England
- First holder: William de Ros
- Present holder: Peter Trevor Maxwell, 27th Baron
- Heir apparent: The Hon. Finbar James Maxwell
- Remainder to: Heirs of the body
- Motto: Crom a boo ("Crom forever")

Baron de Ros (/ruːs/ ROOSS) of Helmsley is the premier baron in the Peerage of England, created in 1288/89 for William de Ros, with precedence to 24 December 1264. (The spelling of the title and of the surname of the original holders has been rendered differently in various texts. The word "Ros" is sometimes spelt "Roos", and the word "de" is sometimes dropped.) Premier baron is a designation and status awarded to the holder of the most ancient extant barony of the Peerage of England. Before the Dissolution of the Monasteries the Prior of the Order of St John in England was deemed the premier baron.

== Ancientness and precedence ==
On 24 December 1264 Robert de Ros (died 1285) was summoned to Simon de Montfort's Parliament in London, and for some time it was considered that the barony was created by writ in that year, giving it precedence over all other English titles unless certain doubtful contentions concerning the title of the Earl of Arundel were accepted. The only older peerage titles in the British Isles are: Baron Kerry and Lixnaw (1181, held by the Marquess of Lansdowne), Baron Offaly (1199, later creation held by the Duke of Leinster), and Baron Kingsale (c. 1223) in the Peerage of Ireland, and Earl of Mar (predates 1115) and Earl of Sutherland (1230) in the Peerage of Scotland.

According to The Complete Peerage:

In 1616 the barony of De Ros was allowed precedence from this writ [of 24 December 1264], a decision adopted by the Lords in 1806 (Round, Peerage and Pedigree, vol. i, pp. 249-50); but these writs, issued by Simon in the King's name, are no longer regarded as valid for the creation of peerages.

== Style ==
Whenever a man holds the title, he is considered the premier baron of England. However, whenever a woman holds the title, the holder of the next-highest barony held by a man is known as the premier baron. For instance, when Georgiana Maxwell, the most recent female to hold the title, was baroness, the Baron Mowbray, Segrave, and Stourton was considered the premier baron.

== Remainder ==
The Barony may pass to heirs-general rather than just heirs-male, unlike most British titles. The barony may pass to daughters only if there are no sons. Under inheritance law, sisters have an equal right to inherit; there is no special inheritance right due for the eldest sister, as there is for the eldest son. Thus, it is possible that two or more sisters (and their heirs after their deaths) have an equally valid claim to the title; in such a case, the title goes into abeyance. The abeyance ends either when there is only one remaining claimant due to the deaths of the other claimants, or when the Sovereign "terminates" the abeyance in favour of one of the heirs. The peerage has been held by a woman six times, more than any other peerage except that of Baron Willoughby de Eresby.

== Descent ==
The title was originally held by the de Ros family until the death of the tenth Baron in 1508, when it was inherited by his nephew, the 11th Baron. His son, Thomas, inherited the barony and was later created Earl of Rutland. The barony and earldom remained united until the death of the third Earl, Edward Manners. The barony was then inherited by his only daughter, Elizabeth Cecil, while the earldom passed to a male heir, his younger brother. Upon the death of Elizabeth's only son, William Cecil, the title returned to the Manners family, being inherited by the sixth Earl of Rutland.

Again, upon the sixth Earl's death, the barony and earldom were separated (the earldom being inherited by a distant cousin, the great-nephew of the 2nd earl), as the barony was inherited by the Earl's daughter Katherine, who had married George Villiers, 1st Duke of Buckingham. Katherine's son George inherited both the barony and the dukedom, but upon his death the dukedom became extinct and the barony went into abeyance.

The barony had been in abeyance for over a century when Charlotte Boyle-Walsingham who was later to marry Lord Henry FitzGerald, a son of the 4th Duke of Leinster) petitioned King George III to terminate the abeyance in her favour in 1790. (She was the daughter of Robert Boyle-Walsingham by his wife Charlotte, daughter of Sir Charles Hanbury Williams by his wife Frances, daughter of Thomas Coningsby, 1st Earl Coningsby by his wife Frances, daughter of Richard Jones, 1st Earl of Ranelagh by his wife Elizabeth, daughter of Francis Willoughby, 5th Baron Willoughby of Parham, son of William Willoughby, 3rd Baron Willoughby of Parham by his wife Frances, daughter of John Manners, 4th Earl of Rutland who was a younger brother of the 14th Baron de Ros.) The King referred the matter to the House of Lords, which recommended that the barony remain in abeyance. However, in 1806, George III terminated the abeyance in her favour on the recommendation of his Prime Minister. Charlotte and her heirs then took the additional surname of "de Ros" after "FitzGerald".

The title eventually went into abeyance again upon the death of the 24th Baroness, in 1939. The abeyance was terminated in favour of her eldest daughter, Lady Una Mary Ross (née Dawson) in 1943, and again went into abeyance upon her death in 1956. Two years later, the barony was called out of abeyance again for Una Ross's granddaughter, Georgiana Maxwell (née Ross). As of 2017 the title is held by her son the 27th Baron, the first man to hold the title in over three-quarters of a century, who succeeded his mother in 1983.

The family seat is Old Court, near Strangford, County Down.

== Barons Ros, of Helmsley (1264) ==
- William Ros, 1st Baron Ros (d. 1317)
- William Ros, 2nd Baron Ros (d. 1343)
- William Ros, 3rd Baron Ros (c. 1326–1352)
- Thomas Ros, 4th Baron Ros (1336–1384)
- John Ros, 5th Baron Ros (c. 1360–1394)
- William de Ros, 6th Baron Ros (c. 1369–1414)
- John Ros, 7th Baron Ros (d. 1421)
- Thomas Ros, 8th Baron Ros (c. 1405–1431)
- Thomas Ros, 9th Baron Ros (c. 1427–1464) (forfeit 1464)
- Edmund Ros, 10th Baron Ros (d. 1508) (restored 1485, barony abeyant in 1508)
- George Manners, 11th Baron Ros (d. 1513) (abeyance terminated about 1512)
- Thomas Manners, 1st Earl of Rutland, 12th Baron Ros (d. 1543)
- Henry Manners, 2nd Earl of Rutland, 13th Baron Ros (1526–1563)
- Edward Manners, 3rd Earl of Rutland, 14th Baron Ros (1549–1587)
- Elizabeth Cecil, 15th Baroness Ros (c. 1572–1591)
- William Cecil, 16th Baron Ros (1590–1618)
- Francis Manners, 6th Earl of Rutland, 17th Baron Ros (1578–1632)
- Katherine Villiers, Duchess of Buckingham, 18th Baroness Ros (d. 1649)
- George Villiers, 2nd Duke of Buckingham, 19th Baron Ros (1628–1687) (barony abeyant 1687)
- Charlotte FitzGerald-de Ros, 20th Baroness de Ros (1769–1831) (abeyance terminated 1806), first to be styled "de Ros"
- Henry William FitzGerald-de Ros, 21st Baron de Ros (1793–1839)
- William Lennox Lascelles FitzGerald-de Ros, 22nd Baron de Ros (1797–1874)
- Dudley Charles FitzGerald-de Ros, 23rd Baron de Ros (1827–1907)
- Mary Frances Dawson, Countess of Dartrey, 24th Baroness de Ros (1854–1939) (abeyant 1939)
- Una Mary Ross, 25th Baroness de Ros (1879–1956) (abeyance terminated 1943; abeyant 1956)
- Georgiana Angela Maxwell, 26th Baroness de Ros (1933–1983) (abeyance terminated 1958)
- Peter Trevor Maxwell, 27th Baron de Ros (b. 1958)

The heir apparent is the present holder's son, the Hon. Finbar James Maxwell (b. 1988).

== Family tree ==
Family tree of the Dukes of Rutland, Marquesses of Granby, Earls of Rutland, Viscounts Canterbury, and Barons de Ros

Robert de Ros before 1237–1285
Baron Ros (later de Ros) of Helmsley, 1264
William Ros (Roos) c. 1255–1317; 1st Baron Ros 1299–1316
William Ros (Roos) c. 1285–1343; 2nd Baron Ros 1317–1342	Edward III; 1312–1377; King of England
Henry Percy c. 1321–1368; Baron Percy	William Ros; 1329–before 1352; 3rd Baron Ros 1342–1352	Thomas Ros; 1335–1384; 4th Baron Ros 1352–1384	John FitzAlan c. 1348–1379; Baron Arundel	Edmund of Langley; 1341–1402; Duke of York
Earl of Rutland (1st creation), 1390
Mary de Percy	John Ros d. 1393; 5th Baron Ros 1384–1393	William de Ros c. 1370–1414; 6th Baron Ros 1394–1414	Margaret; 1372–1439	Edward of Norwich; 1373–1415; Duke of York, Earl of Rutland	Richard of Conisburgh; 1375–1415; Earl of Cambridge
Earldom title disused, 1415
Earl of Rutland (1st creation), restored 1425
John Ros c. 1397–1421; 7th Baron Ros 1414–1421	Thomas Ros; 1406–1430; 8th Baron Ros 1421–1430	Richard of York; 1411–1460; Duke of York
Earl of Rutland (2nd creation), 1446
Thomas Ros; 1427–1464; 9th Baron Ros 1430–1464	Anne of York; 1439–1476; Duchess of Exeter	Edward IV; 1442–1483; King of England	Edmund; 1443–1460; Earl of Rutland	Richard III; 1452–1485; King of England
Barony forfeit 1464	Earldom extinct, 1460
Barony restored 1485
Robert Manners d. 1495	Eleanor Ros d. 1487	Edmund Ros c. 1455–1508; 10th Baron Ros 1485–1508
Barony abeyant, 1508
Barony abeyance terminated, c. 1512
George Manners c. 1470–1513; 11th Baron Ros c. 1512–1513	Anne St Leger; 1476–1526
Earl of Rutland (3rd creation), 1525
Thomas Manners c. 1492–1543; 1st Earl of Rutland, 12th Baron de Ros
Henry Manners c. 1516–1563; 2nd Earl of Rutland, 13th Baron de Ros	John Manners; 1527–1611
Edward Manners; 1549–1587; 3rd Earl of Rutland, 14th Baron de Ros	John Manners c. 1552–1588; 4th Earl of Rutland	George Manners c. 1572–1623
Elizabeth Cecil c. 1572–1591; 15th Baroness Ros; 1587–1591	Roger Manners; 1576–1612; 5th Earl of Rutland	Francis Manners; 1578–1632; 6th Earl of Rutland, 17th Baron de Ros; 1618–1632	George Manners; 1580–1641; 7th Earl of Rutland	Frances Manners; 1588–1643
William Cecil; 1590–1618; Earl of Exeter; 16th Baron Ros; 1591–1618	Katherine Manners; 1590–d. 1649; Duchess of Buckingham, 18th Baroness de Ros; 1632–1649	Francis Willoughby; 1614–1666; Baron Willoughby of Parham	John Manners; 1604–1679; 8th Earl of Rutland
Baron Manners of Haddon, 1679; Duke of Rutland and Marquess of Granby, 1703
George Villiers; 1628–1687; Duke of Buckingham, 19th Baron de Ros; 1649–1687	Elizabeth Jones c. 1633–1695; Countess of Ranelagh	John Manners; 1638–1711; 1st Duke of Rutland, etc., 9th Earl of Rutland
Barony de Ros abeyant, 1687
Frances Coningsby d. 1715; Countess Coningsby	John Manners; 1676–1721; 2nd Duke of Rutland, etc., 10th Earl of Rutland
Frances (Coningsby) Hanbury Williams; 1707/8–1781	John Manners; 1696–1779; 3rd Duke of Rutland, etc., 11th Earl of Rutland
Charlotte (Hanbury Williams) Boyle-Walsingham; 1738–1790	John Manners; 1721–1770 styled Marquess of Granby	Lord George Manners-Sutton; 1723–1783
Baron de Ros, abeyance terminated, 1806	Baron Manners of Foston, 1807
Charlotte FitzGerald-de Ros; 1769–1831; 20th Baroness de Ros; 1806–1831	John Manners; 1751–1760 styled Lord Roos	Charles Manners; 1754–1787; 4th Duke of Rutland, etc., 12th Earl of Rutland	Charles Manners-Sutton; 1755–1828	Thomas Manners-Sutton; 1756–1842; 1st Baron Manners; 1807–1842
Viscount Canterbury and Baron Bottesford, 1835
Henry FitzGerald-de Ros; 1793–1839; 21st Baron de Ros; 1831–1839	William FitzGerald-de Ros; 1797–1874; 22nd Baron de Ros; 1839–1874	John Henry Manners; 1778–1857; 5th Duke of Rutland, etc., 13th Earl of Rutland	Charles Manners-Sutton; 1780–1845; 1st Viscount Canterbury, etc. 1835–1845
Baron Roos of Belvoir, 1896
Henry FitzGerald-de Ros; 1827–1907; 23rd Baron de Ros; 1874–1907	Charles Cecil John Manners; 1815–1888; 6th Duke of Rutland, etc., 14th Earl of Rutland	John James Robert Manners; 1818–1906; 7th Duke of Rutland, etc., 15th Earl of Rutland, 1st Baron Roos	Charles John Manners-Sutton; 1812–1869; 2nd Viscount Canterbury, etc. 1845–1869	John Henry Thomas Manners-Sutton; 1814–1877; 3rd Viscount Canterbury, etc. 1869–1877	John Manners-Sutton; 1818–1864; 2nd Baron Manners; 1842–1864
Mary Dawson; 1854–1939; Countess of Dartrey; 24th Baroness de Ros; 1907–1939	Henry John Brinsley Manners; 1852–1925; 8th Duke of Rutland, etc., 16th Earl of Rutland, 2nd Baron Roos	Henry Manners-Sutton; 1839–1914; 4th Viscount Canterbury, etc. 1877–1914	Graham Edward Henry Manners-Sutton	John Manners-Sutton; 1852–1927; 3rd Baron Manners; 1864–1927
Barony abeyant, 1939
Barony abeyance terminated, 1943
Una Mary Ross; 1879–1956; 25th Baroness de Ros; 1943–1956	Robert Charles John Manners; 1885–1894 styled Lord Haddon	John Henry Montagu Manners; 1886–1940; 9th Duke of Rutland, etc., 17th Earl of Rutland, 3rd Baron Roos	Henry Frederick Walpole Manners-Sutton; 1879–1918; 5th Viscount Canterbury, etc. 1914–1918	Charles Graham Manners-Sutton; 1872–1941; 6th Viscount Canterbury, etc. 1918–1941	Francis Henry Manners; 1897–1972; 4th Baron Manners; 1927–1972
Barony abeyant, 1956	Viscountcy extinct, 1941
Barony abeyance terminated, 1958
Georgiana Angela Maxwell; 1933–1983; 26th Baroness de Ros; 1958–1983	Charles John Robert Manners; 1919–1999; 10th Duke of Rutland, etc., 18th Earl of Rutland, 4th Baron Roos	John Robert Cecil Manners; 1923–2008; 5th Baron Manners; 1972–2008
Peter Trevor Maxwell b. 1958; 27th Baron de Ros; 1938–present	David Charles Robert Manners b. 1959; 11th Duke of Rutland, etc., 19th Earl of Rutland, 5th Baron Roos	John Hugh Robert Manners b. 1956; 6th Baron Manners; 2008–present
Finbar James Maxwell b. 1988	Charles John Montague Manners b. 1999 styled Marquess of Granby	John Alexander David Manners b. 2011

== Arms ==
Coat of arms of Peter Maxwell, Baron de Ros of Helmsley
Coronet A Coronet of a Baron Crest Crom A Boo (I will burn) Helm First: On a chapeau gules, turned up, ermine, a Peacock in its pride, proper (de Ros). Second: A Monkey, statant, proper, environed round the loins and chained, or (For FitzGerald). Escutcheon Quarterly: 1st and 4th, Argent a Saltire Gules (Fitzgerald); 2nd and 3rd, Gules three Water Bougets Argent (de Ros) Supporters On either side a Falcon wings expanded and inverted proper
