= Richard Ros =

English nobleman and poet (1429–1482)

Sir Richard Ros (8 March 1429 – 1482) was an English poet, the son of William de Ros, 6th Baron Ros, lord of Hamlake (Helmsley) in Yorkshire and of Belvoir in Leicestershire.

== Poetry ==
In Harl. manuscript 372 the poem of "La Belle Dame sanz Mercy," first printed in William Thynne's Chaucer (1532), has the ascription "Translatid out of Frenche by Sir Richard Ros." "La Belle Dame sanz Mercy" is a long and rather dull poem from the French of Alain Chartier, and dates from about the middle of the 15th century. It is written in the Midland dialect, and is surprisingly modern in diction.

The opening lines "Half in a dreme, not fully wel awoke, The golden sleep me wrapped under his wing," have often been quoted, but the dialogue between the very long-suffering lover and the cruel lady does not maintain this high level.

He died in 1482. Records last mention him in 1492.

== Worldly goods ==
Ros made his will in 1482, and bequeathed his personal jewellery and a collar of gold of the king's livery to his nephew, Sir Henry Ros, and a gold chain to Elizabeth Ros, his great niece, who was then a gentlewoman in the household of Elizabeth of York. He left a manuscript of Arthurian romance to his niece Eleanor or Alianor Haute. He left his bed of silk embroidered with white hearts to his wife Margaret. The hearts may have been a reference to Anne of Bohemia.

Note: The nephew mentioned, Sir Henry Ros(or Roos) constable of Roxburgh Castle, son of Sir Robert Ros( or Roos), who was son of William de Ros, 6th baron de Ros.

== Family and namesake nephew ==
Richard Ros married Margaret Vernon, a daughter of Richard Vernon and widow of Richard Longueville. She was a lady in waiting to Margaret of Anjou. They had no children.

His nephew Richard Ros, a son of Thomas de Ros, 8th Baron de Ros, married Joan Knyvett. Their daughter Mary was a gentlewoman at the royal court. She first married Hugh Denys. Her second husband was Sir Giles Capel. One of Mary's books, a gift from Elizabeth of York survives, The Scale of Perfection by Walter Hilton, and she signed in it as "Mary Denys" and "Dame Capill".
