= Robert de Todeni =

11th-century Anglo-Norman nobleman

Robert de Todeni, also known as Robert of Belvoir, was an Anglo-Norman nobleman who held lands in England after the Norman Conquest.

== Background ==
Robert held lands in Guerny and Vesly in Normandy. He belonged to a branch of the Tosny family that originated near Eure in Normandy. His exact relation to the Tosny family is unclear, but it has been suggested that he was a younger brother of Roger I of Tosny. He had a (probably elder) brother named Berengar Hespina and a sister named Bertha, who married Guy I of Laval.

== Life ==
In the Domesday Book of 1086, Robert is listed as the lord of Belvoir. This lordship is considered a feudal barony, making Robert the first baron of Belvoir.

Some of these lands had been held prior to the Conquest by Thorgautr Lagr, Oswulf son of Frani and others. Robert's son Berengar was given Thorgautr's lands in Oxfordshire and Nottinghamshire, which he may have held from his father. Robert also had lands in Northamptonshire, located south of Rockingham, and he might have been the first castellan of Rockingham Castle.

Robert and his wife founded Belvoir Priory, sometime between 1076 and 1088 as a priory of St Albans Abbey. The choice to make Belvoir a dependent priory of St Albans may have been because Oswulf, previous owner of some of his lands, had also given lands to St Albans.

== Family and Descendance ==
Robert married Adelais. They had three sons, Berengar, William, and Geoffrey, as well as three daughters, Albreda, Adelisa, and Agnes. Berengar inherited the Norman lands and William inherited the English lands. All three sons died without offspring, leaving their sisters as the eventual heiresses. Albreda, the eldest daughter, married Robert de Insula and died before 1129 without issue. Adelisa married Roger Bigod, and died after August 1127. Agnes, the youngest, married first Ralph de Beaufour and second Hubert de Ryes. Belvoir eventually went to Cecilia Bigod, the youngest daughter of Adelisa and Roger, and the Norman lands went to Hugh Bigod, her brother. Agnes is not recorded as having inherited any of the lands connected with the barony of Belvoir. The historian Judith Green speculates that because Berengar did not inherit any of the English lands, he may have been the son of an earlier marriage of Robert.

Robert died around 1093, although some older sources give a date of 1088. He was buried at Belvoir Priory, according to the priory's own history.
