= William Roos =

William Roos may refer to:

- William Roos (artist) (1808–1878), Welsh artist and engraver
- William Roos (writer) (1911–1987), American novelist, playwright, and screenwriter

== See also ==
- William de Ros (disambiguation), a series of English barons sometimes spelled William de Roos or William Roos
