= Henry Roos =

English knight

Sir Henry Roos (Note: Also Henry Rous, Henry Rose.) (died 1504), Lord of West Grinstead, was an English knight who served as Constable of Roxburgh Castle (1458–60), Sheriff of Sussex & Surrey (1477 & 1483) and originally fought on the Lancastrian side during the War of the Roses, however was pardoned.

== Life ==
Roos was the eldest son of Robert Roos, Lord of Moor End and Anne Halsham. When his father died in 1448, Henry succeeded as Keeper of Rockingham Forests. Henry was appointed Constable of Roxburgh Castle, Scotland in 1458 until 1460. He fought on the side of Henry VI and the House of Lancaster during the Battle of Wakefield (30 December 1460), at Mortimer's Cross (2 February 1461), in the Second Battle of St Albans (17 February 1461) and the Battle of Towton (29 March 1461). He fled to Scotland after the Battle of Towton, with Margaret of Anjou and travelled with Margaret to France. Henry also fought at the Battle of Tewkesbury on 4 May 1471 where the Lancaster army was defeated and sought sanctuary in Tewkesbury Abbey after the battle. He was pardoned afterwards and was appointed as Sheriff of Sussex & Surrey in 1477 and 1483. In 1491, Henry was Member of Parliament for Sussex.

Henry died in 1504 and was buried in Church of West Grinstead.

== Marriage and issue ==
He was married firstly to Margaret Berkeley, Lady Powys (died 1481) and secondly as her third husband to Maud, widow of John Harbard and Richard Georges.
