= Mary Dawson, Countess of Dartrey =

British peer

The Right Honourable The Countess of Dartrey
- Born: 31 July 1854; London, England
- Died: 4 May 1939 (aged 84)
- Spouse: Anthony Dawson, 3rd Earl of Dartrey (m. 1878)
- Children: 3, including Una
- Father: Dudley FitzGerald-de Ros, 23rd Baron de Ros

Mary Frances Dawson, Countess of Dartrey, 24th Baroness de Ros of Helmsley (née FitzGerald-de Ros) (31 July 1854 – 4 May 1939), was a British peer. She was born in London. Her parents were the Dudley FitzGerald-de Ros, 23rd Baron de Ros and Lady Elizabeth Egerton. Upon her father's death in 1907, Mary succeeded to the title.

The 24th Baroness married Anthony Dawson, 3rd Earl of Dartrey (1855–1933), in London on 2 October 1878. To them were born three daughters; the Barony of de Ros descended among their issue:

- Lady Una Mary Dawson (1879–1956), who became the 26th Baroness upon the termination of the abeyance in 1943.
- Lady Maude Elizabeth Dawson (1882–1970)
- Lady Eleanor Charlotte Augusta Dawson (1885–?)

Peerage of England
Preceded by Dudley FitzGerald-de Ros	Baroness de Ros; 1907–1939	Succeeded by Una Ross after termination of abeyance in 1943
