= John Ros, 7th Baron Ros =

Arms of Ros: Gules, three water bougets argent

John Ros, 7th Baron Ros of Helmsley (c.1397 – 22 March 1421) was an English nobleman.

He was the eldest son of William Ros, 6th Baron Ros, and Margaret Fitzalan (d. 3 July 1438), the daughter of John FitzAlan, 1st Baron Arundel, by Eleanor Maltravers (d. 3 July 1438), younger daughter and coheir of Sir John Maltravers.

He served as a soldier of Henry V of England during the Hundred Years' War. Six years after the Battle of Agincourt, John participated in the Battle of Baugé. He was among the casualties along with his brother William Ros, Thomas of Lancaster, Duke of Clarence, the governor of Normandy and others. He was buried at the Belvoir Priory.

== Marriage ==
John de Ros married Margery le Despencer, daughter and heiress of Philip le Despencer, 2nd Baron le Despencer, but had no issue by her. After his death, Margery married Roger Wentworth (d. 24 October 1452), esquire, younger son of John Wentworth of Elmsall, Yorkshire, by whom she had issue. She was fined £1000 for having contracted a dishonourable marriage far beneath her station.

== Ancestry ==
Ancestors of John Ros, 7th Baron Ros

8. William de Ros, 2nd Baron de Ros
4. Thomas de Ros, 4th Baron de Ros
9. Margery de Badlesmere
2. William de Ros, 6th Baron de Ros
10. Ralph de Stafford, 1st Earl of Stafford
5. Beatrice Stafford
11. Margaret de Audley
1. John de Ros, 7th Baron de Ros
12. Richard FitzAlan, 10th Earl of Arundel
6. John FitzAlan, 1st Baron Arundel
13. Eleanor of Lancaster
3. Margaret FitzAlan
14. John Maltravers, 1st Baron Maltravers
7. Eleanor Maltravers, 2nd Baroness Maltravers
15. Gwenthin

== Footnotes ==
Peerage of England
Preceded by William Ros	Baron Ros; 1414–1421	Succeeded by Thomas Ros
