= Georgiana Maxwell, 26th Baroness de Ros =

British peeress

The Right Honourable The Baroness de Ros
- Born: 2 May 1933
- Died: 21 April 1983 (aged 49)
- Education: Studley Royal Agricultural College
- Spouse: John Maxwell (m. 1954)
- Children: 2, including Peter
- Relatives: Una Ross (grandmother)

Georgiana Angela Maxwell, 26th Baroness de Ros (née Ross) (2 May 1933 – 21 April 1983) was a British peeress.

== Biography ==
Lady de Ros was the elder daughter of Lieutenant-Commander the Hon Peter Ross RN, elder son of Una Ross, 25th Baroness de Ros, and of the Hon Angela Ierne Evelyn Dixon (born 16 February 1907, died October 2003), a daughter of Herbert Dixon, 1st Baron Glentoran.

Lady de Ros studied at Wycombe Abbey and Studley Royal Agricultural College. She gained a National Diploma in Dairying.

She succeeded her grandmother the 25th baroness, who died in 1956, in the peerage when the barony was called out of abeyance in her favour in 1958. She was the first female holder of the barony to be allowed to sit in the House of Lords after the Peerage Act 1963.

== Marriage and children ==
Lady de Ros married Commander John David Maxwell RN on 24 July 1954. They had two children:

- The Hon Diana Elizabeth Maxwell (born 6 June 1957), married firstly on 29 November 1976 to Jonathan Watkins, without issue, secondly in 1978 to Don Richard Bell, without issue, and thirdly in 1987 to Eric Ford with whom she has one child:
  - Nisha Altalia Maxwell Ford (born 1988)
- Peter Trevor Maxwell, 27th Baron de Ros (born 23 December 1958), the current holder of the title.

Peerage of England
| Preceded by Una Ross | Baron de Ros; 1958–1983 | Succeeded by Peter Maxwell |
