= Robert Ros (died 1448) =

English knight and administrator

Sir Robert Roos (Note: Also Robert de Roos, Robert Ros.) (died 30 December 1448), Lord of Moor End, was an English knight and administrator who served as Carver to King Henry VI of England, Seneschal of Gascony (1442–43), Keeper of Rockingham Castle and Lordship of Rockingham (1443–1448) and Chamberlain and Customer of Berwick-on-Tweed in 1445.

== Life ==
Roos was the fourth son of William Roos, Lord Roos of Helmsley and Margaret de Arundel. Appointed in 1440, Robert was one of the ambassadors to negotiate a peace with France and during 1442 he treated for the king's marriage. He had been appointed as one Henry VI's household knights around this time and served as Carver to the King. From 1443 he held the position of Keeper of Rockingham Castle and Lordship of Rockingham, which he held until 1448. Robert served as Chamberlain and Customer of Berwick-on-Tweed during 1445. In 1448, Roos was sent to conclude a truce with France as part of the Hundred Years' War.

Robert died on 30 December 1448 and was buried in St. Mary's church at Pipewell, Northamptonshire.

== Marriage and issue ==
He was married to Anne, the widow of John Bohun of Midhurst, she was the daughter and heiress of John Halsham of West Grinstead and Applesham, and Maud Mawley, and is known to have had the following known issue:

- Henry Roos married firstly Margaret Berkeley, Lady Powys and secondly Maud, thewidow of John Harbard and Richard Georges.
- John Roos
- Eleanor Roos, married firstly, Robert Lovell, secondly Thomas Proute, and thirdly Richard Haute.
