= Dudley FitzGerald-de Ros, 23rd Baron de Ros =

British Army general

Lieutenant-General The Right Honourable The Lord de Ros KP KCVO JP DL
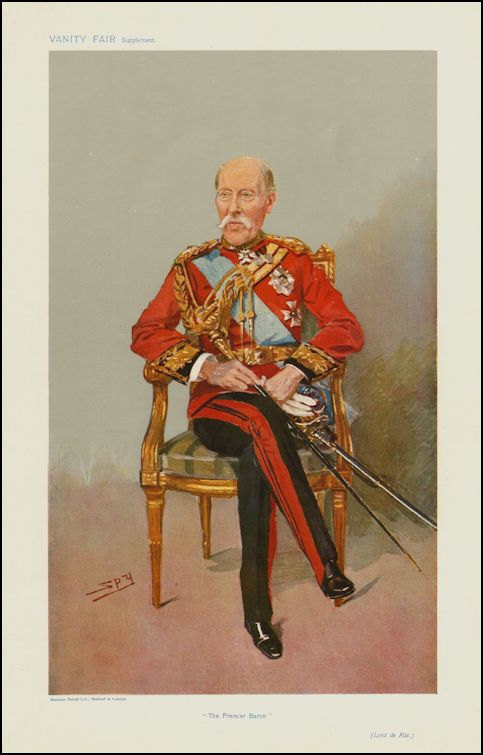

Lord-in-waiting
- In office 1886–1892
- Preceded by: The Lord Camoys
- Succeeded by: Not replaced

Lord-in-waiting
- In office 1885–1886
- Preceded by: The Lord Methuen
- Succeeded by: The Lord Methuen

Personal details
- Born: Dudley Charles FitzGerald-de Ros; 11 March 1827 Brighton, England
- Died: 29 April 1907 (aged 80) Old Court, County Down
- Spouse(s): 1 (1853) Lady Elizabeth Egerton (1832-1892); 2 (1896) Mary Geraldine Mahon (d.1921)
- Children: Mary FitzGerald-de Ros

Military service
- Branch/service: British Army
- Rank: Lieutenant-General
- Unit: 1st Life Guards

Lieutenant-General Dudley Charles FitzGerald-de Ros, 23rd Baron de Ros, KP, KCVO, JP, DL (11 March 1827 – 29 April 1907) was a soldier, courtier and the premier Baron of England.

== Biography ==
He was the son of William FitzGerald-de Ros and Lady Georgiana Lennox. He was born in Brighton.

He purchased a commission as cornet and sub-lieutenant in the 1st Life Guards on 7 February 1845, succeeding Viscount Seaham, and a lieutenancy on 5 May 1848 when Seaham retired. He purchased a captaincy on 31 October 1851, succeeding Thomas Myddelton Biddulph, and on 30 August 1859, he purchased a commission as major and lieutenant-colonel upon the retirement of James Hogg. He was breveted colonel on 30 August 1864. FitzGerald-de Ros retired on half-pay on 29 May 1872.

The Baron was Equerry to the Prince Consort from 1853 to 1861, and then to Queen Victoria from 1861 to 1874. He was also a Conservative Party Lord in Waiting from 1874 to 1880, 1885–1886, and 1886–1892.

Lord de Ros was appointed a Knight of the Order of St Patrick (KP) in the 1902 Coronation Honours list published on 26 June 1902, and was invested by the Lord Lieutenant of Ireland, Earl Cadogan, at Dublin Castle on 11 August 1902.

De Ros was also an early photographer, photographing the royal family in 1859 and example of which is held by the Royal Collection Trust. He was also a member of the Photographic Society of London, later the Royal Photographic Society from 1857. He was a member of the Amateur Photographic Association from at least 1862 to 1869 and elected a Vice President in 1862.

He was appointed Colonel of the 1st Life Guards on 17 November 1902, and kissed hands as Gold Stick in Waiting for the first time for the State Opening of Parliament on 17 February 1903.

== Family ==
He married firstly to Lady Elizabeth Egerton (5 July 1832 – 14 March 1892), daughter of Thomas Egerton, 2nd Earl of Wilton, in Heaton, Lancashire, on 12 October 1853, then to Mary Geraldine Mahon (died 28 December 1921), daughter of Sir William Mahon, 4th Baronet, in London on 14 January 1896. By his first wife, he had one daughter:

- Mary FitzGerald-de Ros (born 1854), who succeeded her father upon his death.

The 23rd Baron had no children by his second wife. He died in Old Court, County Down.

== Sources ==
- "de Ros, Baron (Maxwell) (Baron E 1264)." Debrett's Peerage & Baronetage 1995. London: Debrett's Peerage Limited, 1995. pp. 362–363.

Political offices
Preceded by The Lord Lurgan	Lord-in-waiting; 1874–1880	Succeeded by The Earl of Listowel
Preceded by The Lord Methuen	Lord-in-waiting; 1885–1886	Succeeded by The Lord Methuen
Preceded by The Lord Camoys	Lord-in-waiting; 1886–1892	Succeeded by Not replaced
Military offices
Preceded by Prince Edward of Saxe-Weimar	Colonel of the 1st Life Guards; 1902–1907	Succeeded by The Lord Grenfell
Peerage of England
Preceded by William FitzGerald de Ros	Baron de Ros; 1874–1907	Succeeded by Mary Dawson
