= Robert Ros, 1st Baron Ros de Werke =

English noble

Coat of arms of Robert de Ros, Lord of Warke, Or, three water bougets sable.

Robert de Ros, 1st Baron Ros de Werke (died c.1297), Lord of Warke and Sanquhar was an English noble. He was attainted in 1297, after joining the Scottish side during the First Scottish War of Independence.

== Biography ==
Robert was the eldest son of Robert de Ros of Wark and Margaret de Brus. He was summoned to the English parliament by writ of summons on 24 June 1295. Robert joined the Scots in 1296 and fought against the English. His English estates and titles were attainted by King Edward I of England for his treason. His younger brother William inherited his mother's Kendal estate. Wark was given to his cousin William Ros, 1st Baron Ros of Helmsley.

== Marriage and issue ==
Robert married Laura, whose parentage is currently unknown. They had the following issue:

- Margaret de Ros, who married firstly John Salveyn and secondly Richard Edgar.
- Isabel de Ros, who married firstly John de Knoches and secondly William Crichton.
