= Peter Maxwell, 27th Baron de Ros =

English peer

The Right Honourable The Lord de Ros
- Arms of Baron de Ros of Helmsley: Quarterly, 1st and 4th: Argent, a saltire gules (for Fitzgerald) 2nd and 3rd: Gules, three water bougets argent (for de Ros)

Member of the House of Lords
- Lord Temporal
- Hereditary peerage 21 April 1983 – 11 November 1999
- Succeeded by: Seat abolished

Personal details
- Born: 23 December 1958 (age 67)
- Spouse: Angela Ross (m. 1987)
- Children: 3
- Parent: Georgiana Ross (mother)

Peter Trevor Maxwell, 27th Baron de Ros (born 23 December 1958), is the premier baron of England, by virtue of Baron de Ros being the oldest extant barony in the Peerage of England.

== Early life ==
Lord de Ros is the only son of Lieutenant-Commander John David Maxwell RN and of Georgiana Maxwell, 26th Baroness de Ros, a suo jure peeress. He inherited the barony on the death of his mother in 1983.

He was educated at Headfort School, in Kells, Ireland, as well as Down High School, in Downpatrick, Northern Ireland, before going to a boarding school in the Republic of Ireland.

== Marriage and children ==
On 5 September 1987, Lord de Ros married Angela Sián Ross. They have three children:

- Hon. Finbar James Maxwell (born 14 November 1988), heir apparent to the peerage
- Hon. Katherine Georgiana Maxwell (born 26 October 1990)
- Hon. Jessye Maeve Maxwell (born 8 July 1992)

Peerage of England
Preceded by Georgiana Maxwell	Baron de Ros; 1983–present	Incumbent
