= Una Ross, 25th Baroness de Ros =

British peer

The Right Honourable The Baroness de Ros
- Born: 5 October 1879
- Died: 9 October 1956 (aged 77)
- Spouse: Arthur Ross (m. 1904; died 1917)
- Children: 2+, including
- Mother: Mary FitzGerald-de Ros
- Relatives: Georgiana Ross (granddaughter)

Una Mary Ross, 25th Baroness de Ros of Helmsley (née Lady Una Mary Dawson; 5 October 1879 – 9 October 1956) was a British peer. She succeeded her mother to the title in 1943. She was the daughter of Anthony, 3rd Earl of Dartrey, and his wife, Mary, Countess of Dartrey, who held the barony in her own right.

The 25th Baroness married Arthur John Ross (killed in action 1917) on 30 July 1904, and they had at least two children:

- Lieutenant Commander The Hon. Peter Ross, RN (8 August 1906 – 1940 [killed on active service]), married on 10 September 1929 to The Hon. Angela Dixon, from whom descends the current holders of the title:
  - Georgiana Maxwell, 26th Baroness de Ros (1933–1983)
  - Hon. Rosemary Ross (born 14 January 1937), married in 1973 to Beresford Osborne and had one daughter
- The Hon. Charles Dudley Anthony Ross (5 October 1907 – 1976), married firstly on 31 August 1940 to Lady Elizabeth Jocelyn (died 1982) and secondly in 1953 to Mary Margaret Graham (died 1994), without issue, and had by his first wife:
  - Anthony Arthur Ross (born 27 July 1941), married in 1969 to Joan Cahn, and had two daughters

Peerage of England
In abeyance from 1943 Title last held by Mary Dawson	Baroness de Ros; 1943–1956	In abeyance until 1958 Title next held by Georgiana Maxwell
