= Edmund Ros, 10th Baron Ros =

English noble (c.1455–1508)

- Arms of Ros: Gules, three water bougets argent
- Born: c. 1455
- Died: 23 October 1508; Elsyng Palace
- Father: Thomas Ros, 9th Baron Ros
- Mother: Philippa Tiptoft

Edmund Ros or Roos, 10th Baron Ros of Helmsley (c. 1455 – 23 October 1508) was a follower of the House of Lancaster during the Wars of the Roses. He regained his family title after the accession of King Henry VII of England.

== Family ==
Edmund de Ros, born about 1455, was the only son of Thomas Ros, 9th Baron Ros (9 September 1427 – 17 May 1464), and Philippa Tiptoft (c. 1423 – after 30 January 1487), daughter of John Tiptoft, 1st Baron Tiptoft and Powis. He had four sisters:

- Eleanor Ros, who married Sir Robert Manners of Etal, Northumberland. Their son was George Manners, 11th Baron de Ros.
- Isabel Ros, who married firstly Sir Thomas Everingham, secondly Sir Thomas Grey, and thirdly Sir Thomas Lovell.
- Margaret Ros.
- Joan Ros.

After the death of the 9th Baron, his widow, Philippa, married firstly Sir Thomas Wingfield (d. 1471), by whom she had no issue. After his death, she married Edward Grimston, esquire, (d. 23 September 1478).

== Career ==
As a result of his father's attainder, he went into exile. Under Henry VII, who united the houses of York and Lancaster, the attainder was reversed; and Edmund, Lord Ros, was reinstated in his ancestral property; Belvoir had been in the possession of the Hastings family for more than twenty years. In the petition to parliament presented by Lord Ros in November 1485, his claims are stated with great moderation, and his sufferings for his loyalty to King Henry VI are not overstated.

About nine years later, Sir Thomas Lovell, who had married Isabel, Edmund's sister, presented a petition to parliament, stating that Edmund was "not of sufficient discretion to guide himself and his livelihood; nor able to serve his sovereign after his duty" and asking "that he might have the guidance and governance of the said Edmund" and all his property. An Act of Parliament was passed giving full powers to Sir Thomas Lovell over the person and property of Lord Ros, and entire possession of the latter at his death upon trust for the other relatives of Lord Ros, reserving only a rent of seven hundred marks to the King, and the right, title, and interest of those who have, or ought to have, possession or occupation of certain portions of the property.

Edmund, Lord Ros, lived at the manor of Elsinges, at Enfield, which he had inherited from his mother, and was probably kept under restraint. On his death, he was buried in the Enfield parish church, on the north side of the altar, where his monument is an arch erected over the tomb of Lady Joyce Tiptoft, his maternal grandmother, and charged with the arms of Ros quartering Badlesmere. Since Edmund had no children, his sisters were his heirs, and Elsinges became the property of his brother-in-law, Sir Thomas Lovell, who, at his death in 1524 bequeathed it to his great-nephew, Thomas Manners, 1st Earl of Rutland, in 1526. Eleanor, the eldest sister and co-heir of Edmund, Lord Ros, married Sir Robert Manners (d. 1495), of Etal, Northumberland. Eleanor was therefore the grandmother of Thomas Manners, 1st Earl of Rutland.

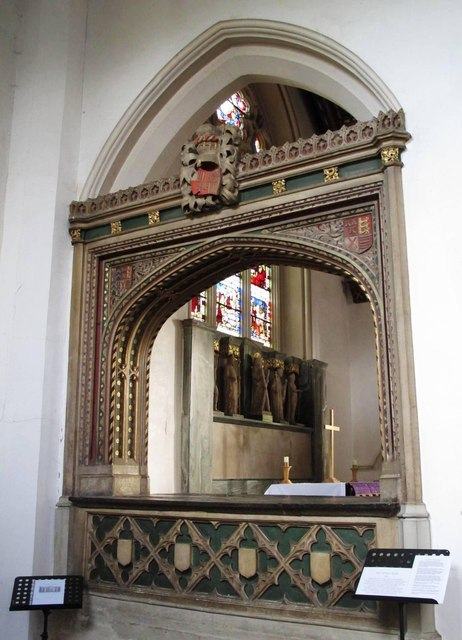
The tomb of Edmund, Lord Ros, in St Andrew's Enfield

== Footnotes ==
=== Works cited ===
- Cokayne, George Edward (1949). The Complete Peerage, edited by Geoffrey H. White. Vol. XI. London: St. Catherine Press. pp. 105–8.
- Montague-Smith, P. W., ed. (1968). Debrett's Peerage, Baronetage, Knightage and Companionage 1968: With Her Majesty's Royal Warrant Holders : Comprises Information Concerning The Peerage, Privy Councillors, Baronets, Knights, and Companions of Orders. Kelly's directories. ISBN 1376067064.
- Richardson, Douglas (2011). Magna Carta Ancestry: A Study in Colonial and Medieval Families, ed. Kimball G. Everingham. Vol. III (2nd ed.). Salt Lake City. ISBN 144996639X

Peerage of England
| Preceded by Thomas Ros | Baron Ros; 1485–1508 | Succeeded by George Manners |
