= Thomas Ros, 9th Baron Ros =

English nobleman (1427–1464)

- Arms of Ros: Gules, three water bougets argent
- Born: 9 September 1427; Conisbrough Castle, Yorkshire, England
- Died: 17 May 1464 (aged 36)
- Buried: Hexham, Northumberland, England
- Spouse: Philippa Tiptoft
- Issue: Edmund Ros, 10th Baron Ros; Eleanor Ros; Isabel Ros; Margaret Ros; Joan Ros
- Father: Thomas Ros, 8th Baron Ros
- Mother: Eleanor Beauchamp

Thomas Ros or Roos, 9th Baron Ros of Helmsley (9 September 1427 – 17 May 1464) was a follower of the House of Lancaster during the Wars of the Roses.

== Family ==
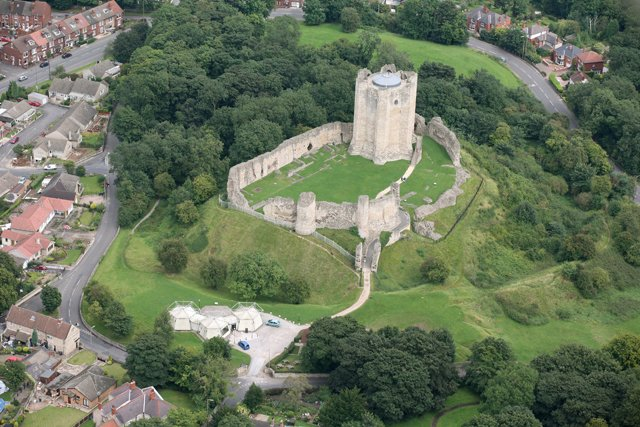
Conisbrough Castle, birthplace of Thomas de Ros, 9th Baron de Ros

Thomas Ros, born 9 September 1427, was the eldest son of Thomas Ros, 8th Baron Ros and Eleanor Beauchamp, second daughter of Richard Beauchamp, 13th Earl of Warwick, and his first wife, Elizabeth Berkeley, daughter and heiress of Thomas de Berkeley, 5th Baron Berkeley. Eleanor was an older half-sister of Henry Beauchamp, Duke of Warwick, and Anne Beauchamp, 16th Countess of Warwick.

Thomas himself was an older maternal half-brother to Henry Beaufort, 3rd Duke of Somerset, and Edmund Beaufort, 4th Duke of Somerset.

== Career ==
Thomas had inherited the barony of Ros when he was barely four years old. His great uncle, Sir Robert Ros, knight, was deputed to perform the office of chamberlain to Archbishop Stafford, on the day of his installation at Canterbury; this office belonged to Lord Ros, from his tenure of the manor of Hethfield, in Kent. The fee for this service was the furniture of the room, and the basin and towel. The manor, and tenure on which it was held, came to the Ros family, from the marriage of an ancestor with Margaret Badlesmere.

Thomas Lord Ros was only eighteen years of age when he was put by the king into full possession of his father's estates. Having been faithful to King Henry VI of England throughout his disputed reign, he was rewarded with certain commercial privileges, consisting, chiefly, of an entire remission of the customary duties on exported wool. In 1456, he had permission to go on a pilgrimage, and in 1460, the king settled on him, as in part, a recompense for the expenses and losses incurred in his service, an annuity of £40, arising out of certain manors forfeited by the Earl of Salisbury.

By at least one near-contemporary account ("Whethamstead's Register"), in the same year he was part of the Lancastrian army which was victorious at the Battle of Wakefield. In February 1461, he was one of the knights made after another Lancastrian victory at the Second Battle of St Albans by Edward of Westminster, Prince of Wales. Later that year he was with the king at York when news arrived of the Lancastrian defeat at the Battle of Towton, and he accompanied the king in his flight to Berwick.

As a loyal supporter of Henry VI, Ros was attainted in Parliament on 4 November 1461. He led a section of the Lancastrian army which attacked John Neville's army at the Battle of Hedgeley Moor on 25 April, where his men fled, and then took part in the Battle of Hexham on 15 May 1464. The Lancastrian army was crushed by Neville; Ros was subsequently found hiding with Lord Hungerford in a wood. He was beheaded the next day at Newcastle for treason, and the Ros lands were confiscated. Belvoir Castle was given to William, Lord Hastings.

== Marriage and children ==
Thomas Ros married Philippa Tiptoft, daughter of John Tiptoft, 1st Baron Tiptoft, by whom he had one son and four daughters:

- Edmund Ros, 10th Baron Ros.
- Eleanor Ros, who married Sir Robert Manners of Etal, Northumberland.
- Isabel Ros, who married firstly Sir Thomas Everingham, secondly Sir Thomas Grey, and thirdly Sir Thomas Lovell.
- Margaret Ros
- Joan Ros.

On 20 August 1471, his widow Philippa married secondly (in the presence of the then duke and duchess of Suffolk), the English diplomat Edward Grimston as his third wife.

== Ancestry ==
Ancestors of Thomas Ros, 9th Baron Ros

8. Thomas de Ros, 4th Baron de Ros
4. William de Ros, 6th Baron de Ros
9. Beatrice Stafford
2. Thomas de Ros, 8th Baron de Ros
10. John FitzAlan, 1st Baron Arundel
5. Margaret Fitzalan
11. Eleanor Maltravers
1. Thomas de Ros, 9th Baron de Ros
12. Thomas de Beauchamp, 12th Earl of Warwick
6. Richard de Beauchamp, 13th Earl of Warwick
13. Margaret Ferrers
3. Eleanor Beauchamp
14. Thomas de Berkeley, 5th Baron Berkeley
7. Elizabeth Berkeley
15. Margaret de Lisle, Baroness Lisle

Peerage of England
Preceded by Thomas Ros	Baron Ros; 1430–1464	Succeeded by Edmund Ros
