= William de Ros, 6th Baron Ros =

English nobleman (c. 1370 – 1414)

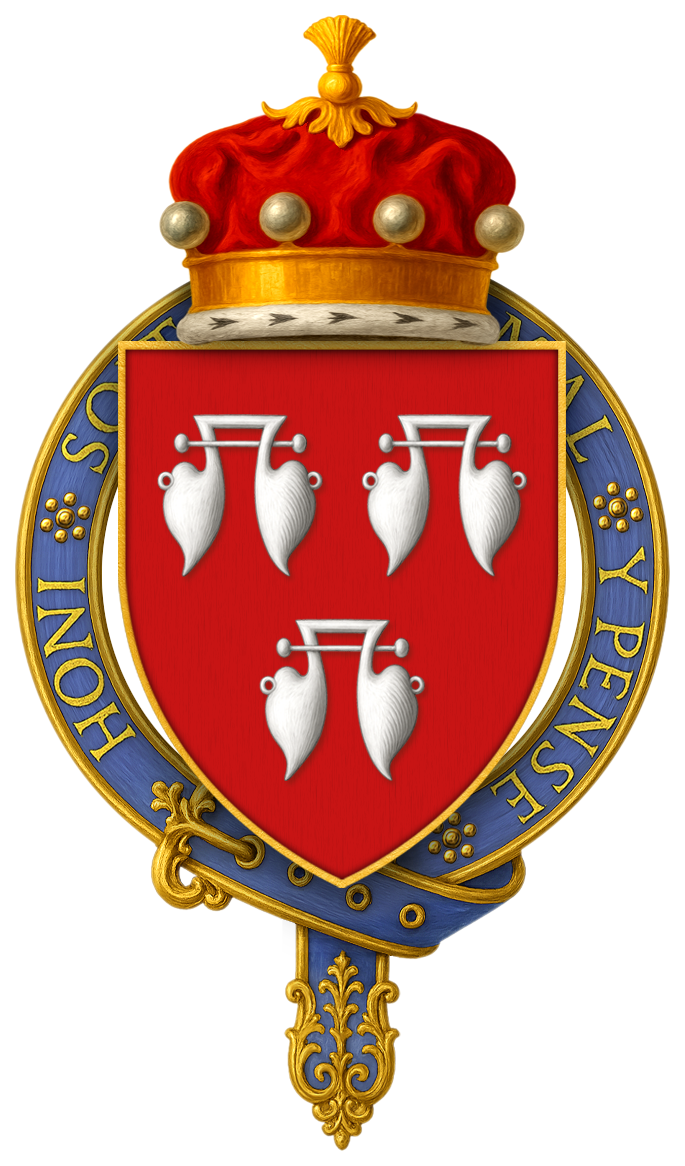
Arms of William de Ros, 6th Baron Ros, from an original illustration of his garter stall plate by William St John Hope: Gules, three water bougets argent

William de Ros, 6th Baron Ros (c. 1370 – 1 November 1414), was a medieval English nobleman, politician and soldier. The second son of Thomas de Ros, 4th Baron Ros, and Beatrice Stafford, William inherited his father's feudal barony and estates (with extensive lands centred on Lincolnshire) in 1394. Shortly afterwards, he married Margaret, daughter of John FitzAlan, 1st Baron Arundel. The Fitzalan family, like that of de Ros, was well-connected at the local and national level. They were implacably opposed to King Richard II, and this may have soured Richard's opinion of the young de Ros.

The late 14th century was a period of political crisis in England. In 1399, Richard II confiscated the estates of his cousin, Henry Bolingbroke, Duke of Lancaster, and exiled him. Bolingbroke invaded England several months later, and de Ros took his side almost immediately. Richard's support had deserted him; de Ros was alongside Henry when Richard surrendered his throne to the invader, who became King Henry IV. De Ros later voted in the House of Lords for the former king's imprisonment. De Ros benefited from the new Lancastrian regime, achieving far more than he had ever done under Richard. He became an important aide and counsellor to King Henry and regularly spoke for him in Parliament. He also supported Henry in his military campaigns, participating in the invasion of Scotland in 1400 and assisting in the suppression of the rebellion of Richard Scrope, Archbishop of York, five years later.

In return for his loyalty to the new regime, de Ros received extensive royal patronage. This included lands, grants, wardships, and the right to arrange the wards' marriages. De Ros performed valuable service as an advisor and ambassador (perhaps most importantly to Henry, who was often in a state of near-penury; de Ros was a wealthy man, and regularly loaned the crown large amounts of money). Important as he was in government and the regions, de Ros was unable to avoid the tumultuous regional conflicts and feuds which were rife at this time. In 1411 he was involved in a land dispute with a powerful Lincolnshire neighbour, and narrowly escaped an ambush; he sought and received redress in Parliament. Partly because of de Ros's restraint in not seeking the severe penalties available to him, he was described by a 20th-century historian as a particularly wise and forbearing figure for his time.

King Henry IV died in 1413. De Ros did not long survive him, and played only a minor role in government during the last year of his life. He may have been out of favour with the new king, Henry V. As Prince of Wales, Henry had fallen out with his father a few years before, and de Ros had supported Henry IV over his son. De Ros died in Belvoir Castle on 1 November 1414. His wife survived him by twenty-four years; his son and heir, John, was still a minor. John later fought at Agincourt in 1415 and died childless in France in 1421. The barony of de Ros was then inherited by William's second son, Thomas, who also died in military service in France, seven years after his brother.

== Background and career under Richard II ==
King Richard II of England (left), to whose deposition de Ros acquiesced in favour of Richard's cousin: Henry Bolingbroke, who became Henry IV (right)

The exact date of William de Ros's birth is unknown. He was described in 1394 as about twenty-three years old, which would place his birth year around 1370. His family was an important one in Lincolnshire and Yorkshire, (Note: The family name was also spelt by contemporaries as Roos, Ross, and Rous, among other variants. Modern historians, thus, also use different spellings.) and the historian Chris Given-Wilson has described them as one of the greatest fourteenth-century baronial families to never receive an earldom. De Ros's father was Thomas de Ros, 4th Baron Ros, who fought in the Hundred Years' War under Edward III (particularly in the Poitiers campaign of 1356). Several years before William's birth, King Edward instructed Thomas to remain with his army on his Irish estates "to prevent the loss and destruction of the country". Thomas married Beatrice, the widow of Maurice Fitzgerald, Earl of Desmond, and daughter of the first Earl of Stafford. He died in Uffington, Lincolnshire, in June 1384, and his eldest son John—William's elder brother—inherited the title as fifth Baron Ros.

De Ros also had two younger brothers, Robert and Thomas, "of whom nothing is known". John's career was brief. By 1382 he had married Mary, half-sister of the Earl of Northumberland. John fought for the new king, Richard II (heir of Edward III, who died in 1377), in the 1385–86 Scottish campaign and with the Earl of Arundel in France the following year. During the early 1390s, John made a pilgrimage to Jerusalem; he died in Paphos on 6 August 1393, on his return journey to England. John and Mary had not produced an heir, and (although he was never expected to succeed to the barony) de Ros was next in line. He inherited as sixth Baron Ros, by which time he had been knighted and appointed to the Privy Council.

=== Inheritance and marriage ===
The de Ros estates were primarily in the east and north of England. William received livery of them in January 1384, (Note: The feudal system was based on the premise that all land belonged to the king. What he held directly was the royal demesne, and that which was granted away was held on his behalf by tenants-in-chief. If he then died without leaving an adult heir who could immediately receive his inheritance, the estates escheated (returned to the king). The king would hold the estates until the heir (if any) reached his majority, at which point he would apply for livery of seisin: the right to enter his estates. Possession was usually obtained by paying a fine to the exchequer.) which gave him an extensive sphere of influence around Lincolnshire, Nottinghamshire, and eastern Yorkshire. By this time, the estate had two dowager baronesses to support: his deceased brother's wife Mary and their mother, Beatrice. Mary died within a year of her husband, and her extensive inheritance was divided among her Percy relations. De Ros received her dower lands, which included the ancient Barony of Helmsley. (Note: The legal concept of dower had existed since the late twelfth century as a means of protecting a woman from being left landless if her husband died first. He would, when they married, assign certain estates to her—a dos nominata, or dower—usually a third of everything he was seised of. By the fifteenth century, a widow was deemed entitled to her dower. The situation the Mowbray heirs experienced was not uncommon in the late Middle Ages. The Holland family inheritance had been more or less the same for the previous eighty years, but when the last Holland Earl of Kent Edmund inherited the title from his brother Thomas (who died childless) in 1404, the estates had to support the dowers of Edmund's mother Alice, his brother's widow, Joan Stafford, and his aunt, Elizabeth of Lancaster, Duchess of Exeter. Edmund died in 1408; his wife became the fourth dowager on the inheritance, and (with no male heirs) it was divided amongst them and Edmund's five sisters.) Beatrice, on the other hand, had outlived three husbands and would outlive William; she was assigned her dower lands in December 1384. This meant that de Ros would never hold a large swath of land, predominantly in the East Riding of Yorkshire.

De Ros received seisin of his estates on 11 February 1394, (Note: Seisin was feudal possession and, William Searle Holdsworth said, had the same root word as the Latin possessio. It applied only to freehold land; J. M. Kaye noted that "By 'seised in demesne' is meant property which either was in the actual possession of a grantor, or else was held from him by persons who held no freehold estate and whose possession did not count as seisin for common law purposes, namely, villeins, who were personally unfree, and customary tenants who, although they were personally free, did not hold their land by freehold tenure".) which included custody of several Clifford family estates; his sister had married Thomas de Clifford, 6th Baron de Clifford around 1379. He held the latter lands until their son came of age around 1411. De Ros married Margaret, daughter of John Fitzalan, 1st Baron Arundel and Eleanor Maltravers, soon after he inherited. She was already in receipt of a 40-mark (Note: A medieval English mark was a unit of currency equivalent to two-thirds of a pound.) annuity from King Richard II because she had been in the household of Richard's recently deceased queen, Anne of Bohemia. His wife gave de Ros what may have appeared to be a useful connection to the crown. Also useful to William was the fact that his wife's father had recently died, so de Ros now had the Earl of Arundel as a brother-in-law. His new connections and the higher political profile they brought may account for the royal grants he soon received of Clifford manors in Yorkshire, Derbyshire, and Worcestershire. These had been the dower lands of Euphemia (widow of Robert, Lord Clifford), who had died in November 1393. De Ros attended the king's wedding to his second wife—Isabella of Valois, daughter of King Charles VI of France—in Calais on 31 October 1396. His wife's grandfather died the following year, and she became Lady Maltravers suo jure.

Although de Ros received some royal favour, Charles Ross has suggested that he may not have been doing as well as expected for a man in his position. Ross suggests that William's Fitzalan connections might have worked against him with the king. Arundel was a staunch political opponent of Richard's, and de Ros's marrying into this politically unpopular family may account for the few offices the king granted him. "It seems strange", says Ross, "that a wealthy young lord, who later proved himself both active and able in the royal service, had no public, and very little local employment during the later years of Richard II". De Ros's situation would not change until the accession of Arundel's political ally, Henry Bolingbroke, as King Henry IV in 1399. He was rarely appointed to peace commissions and did not sit on many oyer and Terminer assizes, even in his own counties. (Note: A commission of oyer and terminer was an investigative body; the name means, literally, "to hear and to determine". Black's Law Dictionary defines the commission as "a court for the trial of cases of treason and felony. The commissioners of assise and nisi prius are judges selected by the king and appointed and authorized under the great seal, including usually two of the judges at Westminster, and sent out twice a year into most of the counties of England, for the trial (with a Jury of the county) of causes then depending at Westminster, both civil and criminal".)

== Regime change and career under Henry IV ==
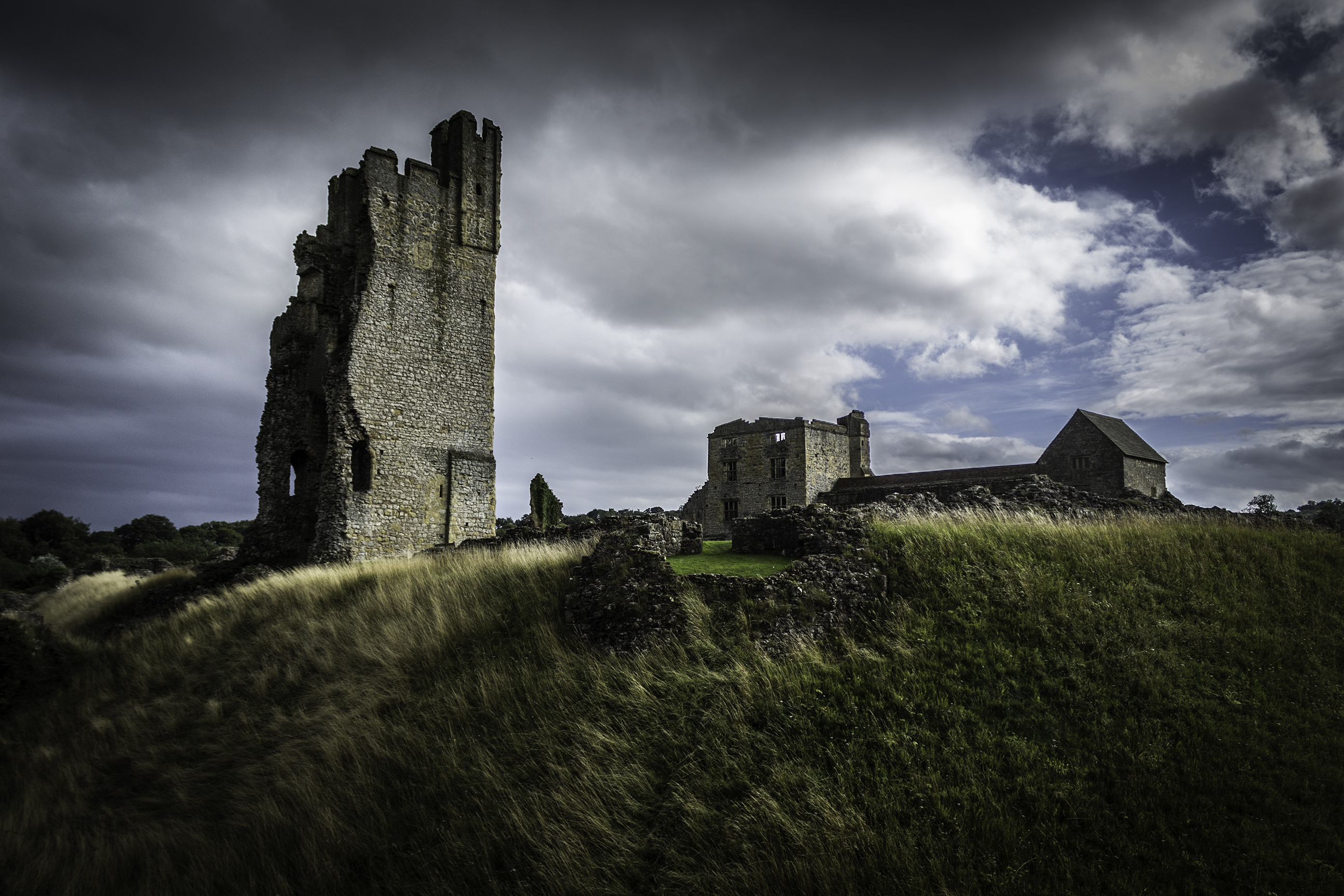
All that remained in 2013 of the de Ros caput, Helmsley Castle. Built in the 12th century by Robert de Ros, the East Tower was heightened in the 14th century.

John of Gaunt—the most powerful noble in the country and second only to the crown in wealth—died in February 1399. Bolingbroke and King Richard had fallen out the previous year, and Richard had exiled Bolingbroke for six years the previous September. Instead of allowing Bolingbroke to succeed to his father's estates and titles, says Given-Wilson, Richard "succumb[ed] to the temptation" to confiscate the Duchy of Lancaster. Richard proclaimed that Bolingbroke's exile was now a life sentence, and cancelled his writs of seisin. He further decreed that Bolingbroke could only request his inheritance at the king's pleasure. Bolingbroke, in Paris, joined forces with the also-exiled Thomas Arundel. Arundel had been Archbishop of Canterbury, and was de Ros's wife's uncle; he lost his office because of his involvement with the Lords Appellant, and been exiled since 1397. With Arundel and a small group of followers, Bolingbroke landed at Ravenspur in Yorkshire in late June 1399. De Ros, bringing a large retinue, joined Bolingbroke's army almost immediately (as did much of the northern nobility). Richard was campaigning in Ireland at the time, and unable to defend his throne. Henry initially announced that he intended only to reclaim his rights as Duke of Lancaster, although he quickly gained enough power and support (including that of de Ros) to claim the throne in Richard's stead and have himself proclaimed King Henry IV. (Note: Chris Given-Wilson notes that "publicly, Henry claimed that he had returned merely to claim his rightful inheritance, a cause which he knew would unite support behind him, and it was later asserted that he had sworn 'upon the relics of Bridlington' ... that this was all he would claim".) In June, de Ros was present at Berkeley Castle when Henry and Richard met for the first time since Henry was exiled; de Ros witnessed their final meeting on 6 September at the Tower of London, when Richard resigned the throne. Bolingbroke's accession as Henry IV saw an uplift in de Ros's fortunes and those of the Fitzalans. De Ros now had strong connections with important figures at court and a relatively close friendship with the new king. In contrast to his treatment by Richard, de Ros's previous loyal service to Henry—and the king's father—earned him significant royal patronage. In the first parliament of the new reign—held at Westminster in October 1399—he was appointed a Trier of Petitions, and was one of the lords who voted to imprison Richard (who later died in Pontefract Castle of unknown causes). De Ros's new position at the centre of government was highlighted in December 1399, when he was appointed to Henry's first royal council.

De Ros's motives for joining Bolingbroke's invasion so swiftly are unknown but, says Given-Wilson, this should be no surprise; for most of Henry's new-found allies, "it is only possible to speculate as to their political allegiance". De Ros may have felt generally aggrieved by Richard's poor treatment of Gaunt and Bolingbroke, and his own lack of promotion under Richard was doubtless important. Whatever his reasons were for rebelling in 1399, de Ros and his father had been Lancastrian (rather than Ricardian) in their loyalties. His father had been one of John of Gaunt's earliest retainers when the young Gaunt was Earl of Richmond, and de Ros had also been retained by Gaunt in the late fourteenth century. Service to the duke had involved de Ros accompanying the duke abroad and travelling on his business on at least five occasions in the last years of Gaunt's life. For his services de Ros received annuities of £40 to £50, and was one of only two knights banneret whom Gaunt retained.

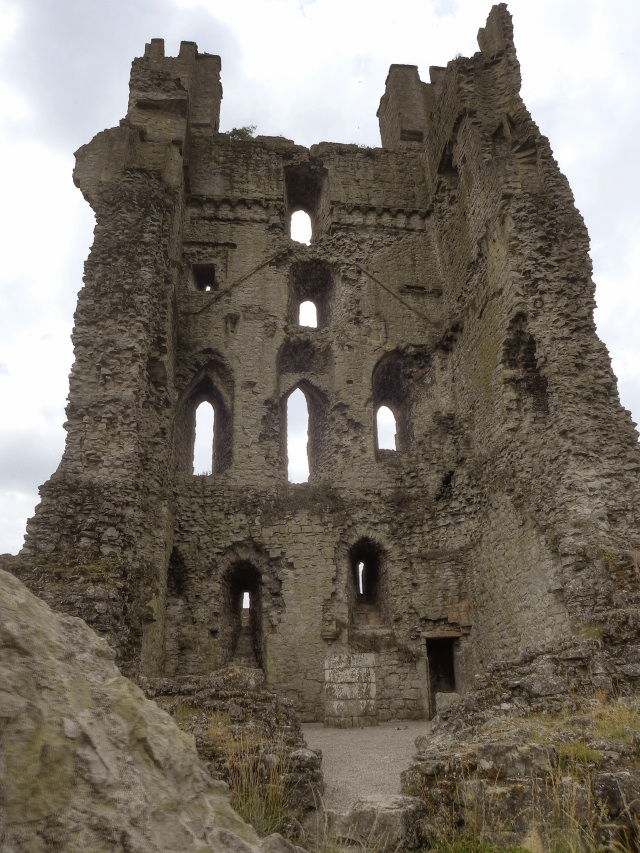
Interior of the East Tower of Helmsley Castle in 2011

=== Local administration and political crisis ===
de Ros was an active royal official in the local administration and became a leading member of political society in the north Midlands and Yorkshire, where he regularly headed royal commissions. He was frequently appointed a justice of the peace, particularly in Leicestershire. De Ros's service to the crown was not confined to the regions; in 1401, he directed the king's attempts to increase the royal income. He was appointed Henry's negotiator with the House of Commons, to persuade the Commons to agree to a subsidy for the king's intended invasion of Scotland later that summer. De Ros and the Commons representatives met in Westminster's refectory. Emphasising "favourable consideration" the Commons would receive from the king, he played heavily on the king's expenses in defending the Welsh and Scottish Marches. Each party was wary of the other; the king did not wish to set a precedent, and the Commons were traditionally wary of the House of Lords. Six years later, de Ros played much the same role—with the Duke of York and the Archbishop of Canterbury, on a committee hearing the Commons' complaints. The result of these discussions was an altercation in which the Commons, reports the parliament roll, were "hugely disturbed". This disturbance, according to J. H. Wylie, was probably the result of something de Ros said and would account for the Commons' reluctance to meet him or his committee. De Ros's remit was to persuade the Commons to grant as substantial a tax—in exchange for as few liberties granted—as possible. An experienced parliamentarian, he attended most parliaments from 1394 to 1413.

Almost from the beginning of his reign, Henry faced problems. Most stemmed from financial insecurity since by 1402 his treasury was empty. Around this time, (Note: There is some uncertainty about when the appointment occurred and when it ended. William Dugdale, in his Baronage, and F. M. Powicke and E. B. Fryde suggest 1403 to 1406, and J. H. Wylie believed it started by 1401 and ended by 1404. Anthony Steele dates de Ros's appointment as between 14 July and 16 September 1403, and says that Furnivall replaced him in this office the following December.) de Ros was appointed Lord Treasurer. Charles Ross suggests that this demonstrated the king's increased confidence in de Ros, who occupied the post for the next four years. He was unable to substantially improve Henry's financial situation, and relations with the Commons worsened. During the 1404 parliament, speaker Arnold Savage confronted the king over his lack of money (and repeated demands for taxation), which Savage said could be ameliorated by reducing the number of annuities paid by the crown. (Note: Henry had paid nearly £5,000 (equivalent to £3,741,124 in 2016) to his followers who accompanied him on his invasion by the October 1399 parliament; they included two earls, three barons and 44 others, including knights and squires.) Savage also condemned an unnamed crown minister for owing royal creditors over £6,000. The House of Commons' dissatisfaction was obvious to the king, who responded within the week. He despatched de Ros, accompanied by Chancellor Henry Beaufort, to the Commons with a comprehensive breakdown of the king's financial requirements. According to Ian Mortimer, "Savage, having attacked royal policy in the King's presence, had no compunction about speaking his mind to the chancellor and treasurer". Henry's government continued to subsist on poor revenues. As Given-Wilson put it, the treasury became "largely reliant on a diminishing circle of the faithful" (which included de Ros). He made numerous loans to the king, and temporarily surrendered his councillor's salary for the sake of the royal finances.

De Ros also performed extensive military service. In 1400, he contracted with the king to bring a fully crewed ship of 20 men at arms and 40 archers to Henry's Scottish invasion. Although the campaign declined in success, de Ros played a part in it. Returning to Westminster, he resumed his office of councillor and participated in Henry's Great Council the following year. In 1402 Owain Glyndŵr rebelled, which impacted de Ros personally. His brother-in-law, Reginald, Lord Grey of Ruthin—who had married de Ros's youngest sister, Margaret—was captured and imprisoned by Glyndŵr; personal animosity between Grey and Glyndŵr may have been to blame for the outbreak of the rebellion. The Welsh demanded a 10,000-mark ransom from the king, who agreed to pay. De Ros, because of his relationship to Grey, also agreed to contribute and led the commission which negotiated with Glyndŵr over its payment and his brother-in-law's release. A friend of de Ros, fellow Midlands baron Robert, Lord Willoughby, accompanied him in the negotiations.

... We have requested, and on your authority directed the respected Lord Sire de Roos and Monsieur William Gascoigne your Chief Justice, as men in whom you have especial confidence, to proceed in all haste towards the north ...

— Cotton MS Cleopatra, F. m. f. 58 b. (letter from the Royal council to King Henry, May 1405, regarding the rebellion in the north).

De Ros was also elected to the Order of the Garter in 1402, and was granted an annuity of 100 marks a year as the king's retainer two years later. In May of that year another rebellion broke out in the north, led by Richard Scrope, Archbishop of York and the disaffected Henry Percy, 1st Earl of Northumberland. One of their first acts was to kidnap the king's envoy. De Ros was part of an extensive network of north Lancastrian loyalists who gathered around the king's cousin Ralph Neville, Earl of Westmorland to suppress the rebellion. (Note: At this time, relations between Westmorland and Henry IV were so close that the King regularly referred to the earl in official documents as his brother.) Henry entrusted de Ros to meet with Westmorland, commander of the king's armies in the north. de Ros was probably chosen because of the king's intimate advisors, his local knowledge would have been the most valuable. The mission was a success; de Ros witnessed the Earl of Northumberland surrendering Berwick Castle to the king, and sat on the commission which condemned Scrope to death without trial in early June 1405. When the king arrived in York to oversee the execution of the rebels, de Ros brought Percy's bonds to him.

Since de Ros had been instructed only to engage the rebels on the king's express instruction, it is difficult to ascertain the role that he and Gascoigne played in the rebellion's suppression. Unlike the Earl of Westmorland, "no more is heard of their activities" in the north until after the confrontation at Shipton Moor. De Ros's role may have been to oversee the later judicial commissions over the rebels, and he was authorised to pardon those who rejected rebellion and wished to return to the king's grace. The fact that so little of their work remains visible to historians may suggest surreptitiousness; possibly, says Given-Wilson, they were little more than spies tailing their prey until the king's main army caught up.

The following year, the king's health (which had not been strong for some time) broke down for good. At the parliament of 1406, Henry IV agreed that since it was clear that poor health prevented him from ruling, a Grand Council should be established to assist him in governing. Although de Ros was on the original list presented to parliament of those to be appointed to the council, how long he served is subject to conjecture. He was attending its meetings in late 1406 (since he was an unofficial "chaperone" for his successor as Lord Treasurer, Lord Furnivall), and may have still been on the council the following June. De Ros regularly witnessed royal charters, and continued his role as the king's spokesman to the Commons. He probably assisted the Lord Chancellor through an increasingly difficult and uncertain period (due to the King's ill health), but it is uncertain whether he chose—or was instructed—to do so.

=== Royal favour ===
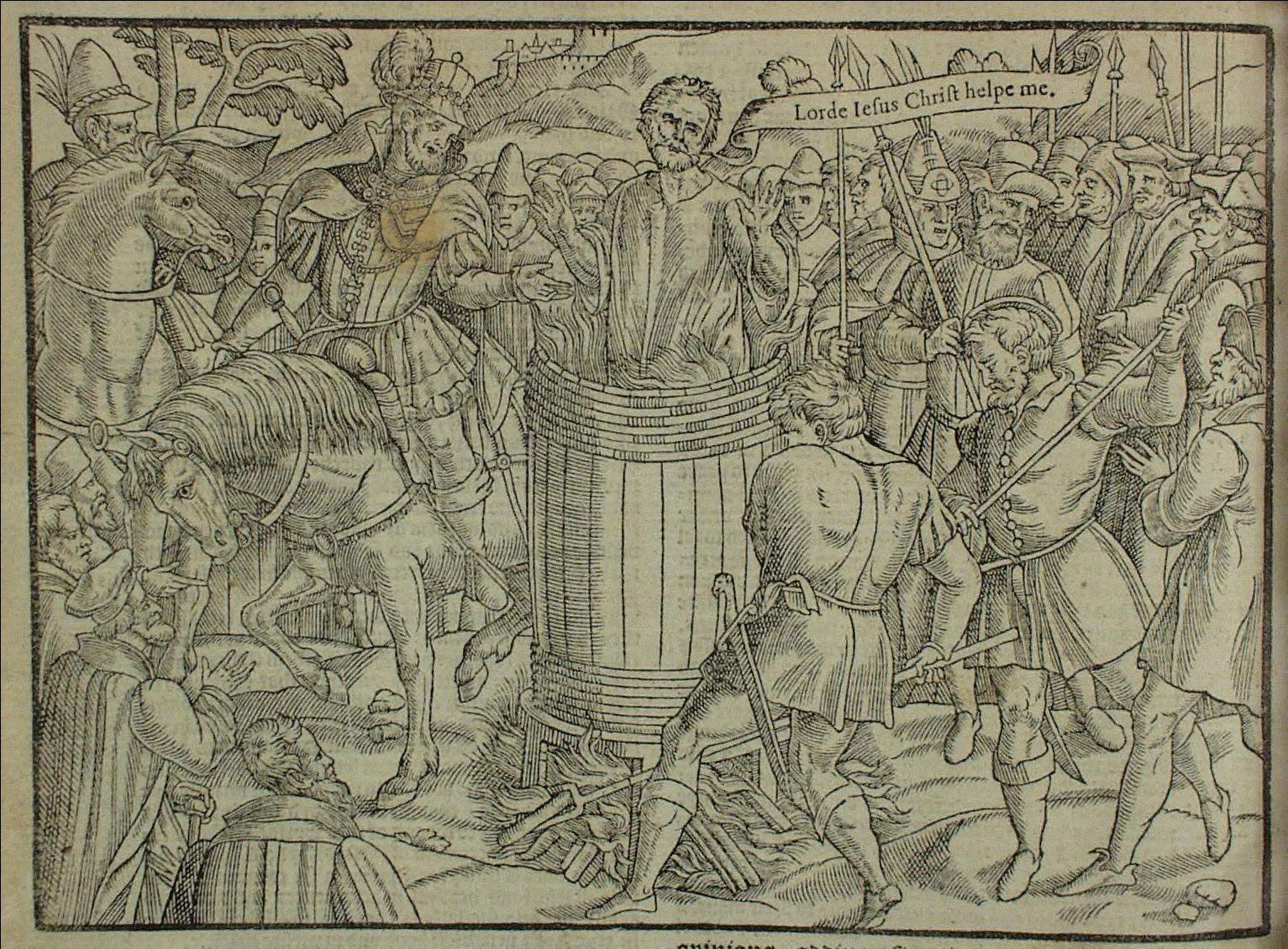
Sixteenth-century illustration of John Badby being burned in a barrel

For the duration of Henry's reign, de Ros was "high in the King's confidence and enjoyed especially trusted positions". The historian Mark Arvanigian summarises de Ros's position as "clearly a reliable and trusted servant, as well as being a reasonably talented administrator and royal councillor". Henry continued relying on loans to carry out policy, and de Ros's loan funded the Calais garrison. Unlike many—and indicating the favour with which the King held him in—de Ros was promised repayment, manifested in the royal patronage he continued to receive. By 1409, for example, he had been appointed to the lucrative positions of master forester and constable of Pickering Castle. These offices strengthened his influence in the region, allowed him to appoint deputies, and gave him another patronage of his own to dispense. In October of that year, de Ros paid £80 for the custody of Giffard family lands in the South Midlands. John Tuchet, Lord Audley died in December, and de Ros was granted Audley's lands while the Audley heir was a minor. De Ros also paid £2,000 for the right to arrange the heir's marriage. The Audley estates from which de Ros intended to get his money back were greatly overvalued, and he was charged only half the original amount. These grants were in addition to his annual conciliar salary of £100, and he held the manor of Chingford to quarter himself and his men when he was regularly in the south on royal business. De Ros remained an active councillor and undertook significant military and diplomatic roles. He was one of Henry's few advisors who, even when the king's council was not sitting, remained a close counsellor.

De Ros remained in the King's favour through the final years of Henry's reign. As a trusted counsellor, in 1410 he participated in what has been described as "a show trial of national importance". The previous year, an ecclesiastical court had found John Badby of Evesham guilty of Lollardy. According to church custom, Badby had been given a year's grace to recant. He refused; if anything, his opinions were more entrenched than before. On 1 March 1410, Badby was brought before a convocation at the Friars-Preachers House. De Ros and his fellow barons found Badby guilty and passed secular judgement. He was burnt to death (possibly, according to sixteenth-century martyrologist John Foxe, in a barrel) in Smithfield. (Note: Lollardy was a late fourteenth-century religious reform movement which was deemed heresy by the fifteenth century. Although the movement was long-lived due to its genuine appeal, King Henry IV had a personal antipathy against it. In 1401, he signed into law De heretico comburendo ("On the Burning of Heretics"); for the first time in English history, it provided a statutory instrument for the burning of those found guilty of heresy before church courts. This, suggests Richard Rex, was "to bolster his own feeble legitimacy by support for orthodoxy".)

=== Regional disorder ===
After the death of the Earl of Stafford in 1403 (whose infant heir had a twenty-year minority), de Ros was the leading baron in Staffordshire. He was responsible for upholding the king's peace during a period that has been a by-word for the kind of pervasive lawlessness that de Ros, like all regional magnates, was expected to suppress. Particularly well-known is the frequency with which the baronage and gentry indulged in internecine fighting. (Note: For example, the second quarter of the fifteenth century saw a long-running feud between branches of the Neville family in the north. By the 1450s, such feuds were legion: between the Courtenay and Bonville families in the southwest; between the two powerful northern dynasties, the Nevilles (again) and the Percies; and between Ralph, Lord Cromwell and William, Lord Tailboys in the Midlands.) In 1411, his intervention averted a tense situation which was likely to erupt into armed conflict between local gentry Alexander Mering and John Tuxford. This was only a temporary ceasefire, however; the following year, de Ros sponsored a second arbitration between the parties with which they promised to abide on pain of a 500-mark fine. In early 1411 Sir Walter Tailboys caused a riot in Lincoln, attacked the sheriffs, killed two men, and lay in wait outside the city in ambush (preventing its residents from leaving). Lincoln's citizens petitioned the king for justice and explicitly requested that de Ros and his kinsman, Lord Beaumont, be appointed to investigate. They found in favour of the Lincoln citizenry and, reflecting the severity of Tailboy's offence, he was bound over to keep the peace for £3,000. Due to such efforts, Simon Payling has suggested that de Ros's "reputation for fair-mindedness" made him a popular figure for settling gentry disputes.

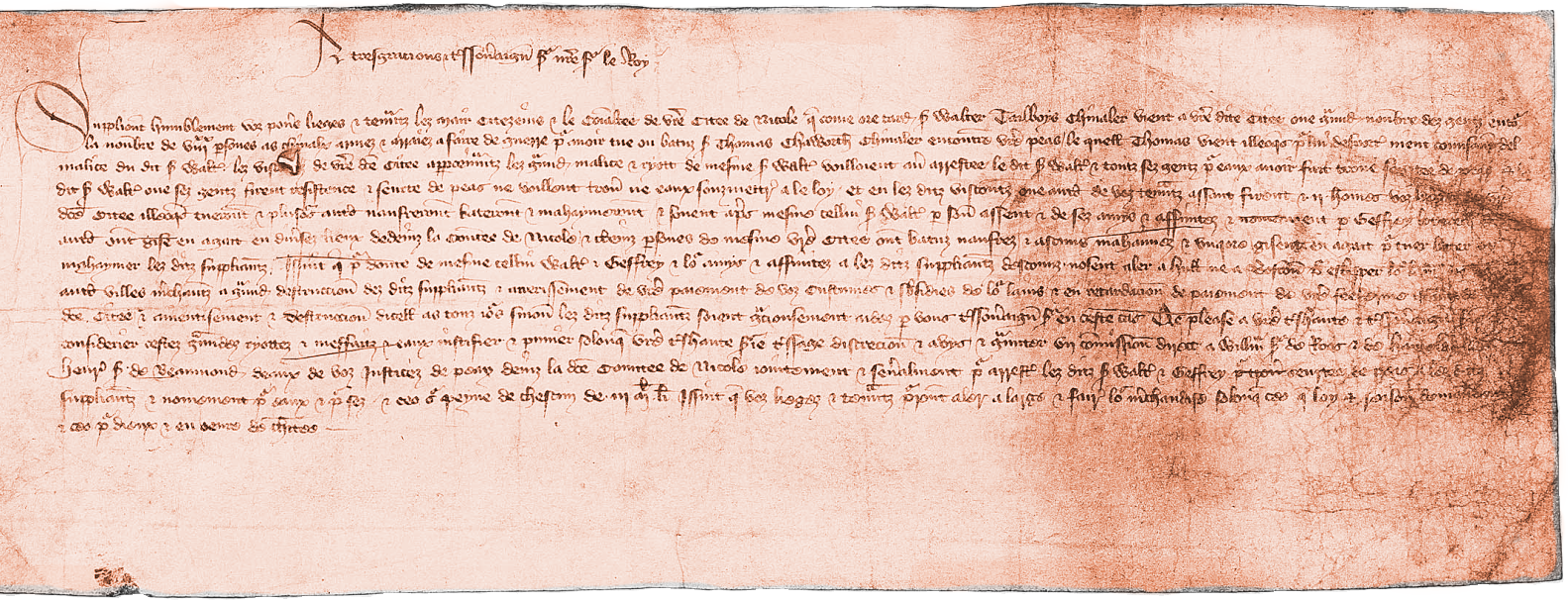
Petition, in French, sent to the King from the city of Lincoln in May 1411 requesting that he "issue a commission to Roos and Beaumont that they summon Tailboys and Lutterell to keep the peace"

Despite his aptitude for dispute resolution, de Ros was not exempt from local conflict. He became involved in a dispute with his Lincolnshire neighbour, Sir Robert Tirwhit, in 1411. Tirwhit was a newly appointed royal justice and a well-known figure in the county. He and de Ros fell out over conflicting claims to common grazing and associated hay-mowing and turf-digging rights in Wrawby. An arbitration took place before Justice William Gascoigne, who ordered a Loveday arranged. (Note: A Loveday (dies amoris in Latin) was a day assigned to arbitrate between disputants and resolve legal differences through arbitration, rather than litigation. The practice died out during the 17th century.) The Loveday was intended to offer both parties the opportunity to demonstrate their support for the arbitration process; the two men were expected to attend with companions (or followers), keeping their numbers to a minimum. Tirwhit, however, brought a small army of about 500 men. Later justifying the size, he claimed not to have agreed to the Loveday in the first place. De Ros kept to the arrangement vis á vis his retinue, bringing with him only Lords Beaumont and de la Warre (the latter, like Beaumont, a relative). (Note: Ros's petition to parliament, which lays out Gascoigne's decision, reads less specifically than de Ros suggested: "And the said William Gascoigne decided that the said William de Roos should come there with the husbands of two of his kinsfolk, or other friends, in a peaceful manner, with as many men as customarily rode with them. And that the said Robert should come peacefully with two of his kinsmen or friends, with as many men as is fitting for their estate and position".)

He and his companions escaped Tirwhit's ambush unharmed. Given-Wilson has argued that, although the case was not uncommon in its basic facts, "the personal involvement of a royal justice in such a calculated act of violence, and the status of the protagonists, clearly gave it an interest above the usual". On 4 November 1411, de Ros petitioned parliament—at which he was appointed a Trier of Petitions—for satisfaction. The case was heard before the Lord Chamberlain and the Archbishop of Canterbury, and took over three weeks to determine. The Chamberlain and Archbishop requested the attendance of de Ros and all the "knyghtes and Esquiers and Yomen that had ledynge of men" for him. After deliberating, they found firmly in de Ros's favour. Tirwhit was bound to give de Ros a quantity of Gascon wine and provide the food and drink for the next Loveday, where he would publicly apologise to de Ros. In his apology, Tirwhit acknowledged that a nobleman of de Ros's position could also have brought an army and he had shown forbearance in not doing so. The only responsibility de Ros was given as part of the arbitration award was that at the second Loveday, he would provide the entertainment. (Note: Considering the number of public offices Tirwhit had to lose and the outcry which erupted from his "grossest turbulence and breach of the peace", it has been suggested that he "doubtless considered himself fortunate to escape" so lightly. Tirwhit retained his office on the Lincolnshire King's Bench for the rest of his life (another quarter of a century).)

== Later years and death ==
... Atte Wrareby in the shire of Lincoln on the Saturday neghst after the Feste of Sainte Michael dyd assemble greet noumbre of men aurmed and areyed agaynst the pees, to lygge in awayte agaynst the same Lord the Roos.

— Extract of Ros's petition against Tirwhit to the Commons at the November 1411 parliament

Although the King's health continued to decline, he improved sufficiently in 1411 to direct the formation of a new council of his loyal councillors; this intentionally excluded his son, Prince Henry and the prince's associates, Henry and Thomas Beaufort, from power. De Ros—the "reliable royalist"—sat on the council for the next fifteen months with other "unswervingly loyal" officials, such as the Bishops of Durham and Bath and Wells and the Archbishop of York. De Ros and the others now signed administrative documents which had required the king's signet seal. A. L. Brown and Henry Summerson, two of the king's recent biographers, note that "at the end of his reign, as at its beginning, Henry placed his trust principally in his Lancastrian retainers".

Henry IV died on 20 March 1413. De Ros played no significant role in government from then on, after probably attending his last council meeting in 1412. Charles Ross posits that he was "no particular favourite" of the new king, Henry V, which Ross attributes to Henry V's distrust of his father's loyalists (who, in his eyes, kept him from what he felt was his rightful position at the head of government during his father's illness). Whether or not Henry excluded him from the government, de Ros lived only eighteen months into the new reign. His mother had drawn up her will in January 1414, of which de Ros was an executor. Early that year, de Ros sat on a final anti-Lollard commission (Note: These commissions were in response to the Oldcastle Revolt of January 1414: "chief commissioner to hear and determine as to rebellions, treasons, &co. in Middlesex, and in Nottinghamshire and Derby committed by the King's subjects commonly called Lollards". The commission was composed of six men, the three most important of whom were de Ros, Henry Scrope, and London Mayor William Cromer. Maurice Keen described the rebellion as a "complete fiasco".) and was tasked with investigating the murder of an MP in the Midlands.

De Ros died in Belvoir Castle on 1 November 1414. He had drawn up his will two years earlier, and added a codicil in February 1414. (Note: De Ros's will has been printed in full in F. M. Powicke's The Register of Archbishop Chichele II, 22–27. It is extremely detailed. Ros specified three burial sites (depending on where he died), with the proviso that the unused locations should receive handsome bequests. His will makes full provision for his sons, distributing estates, goods, and annuities between them.) He died a wealthy man, with one of Yorkshire's highest disposable incomes. (Note: It has been estimated that his income was matched by only three of his fellow Yorkshire-based barons: Neville, Furnivall, and Scrope of Bolton.)

Three of de Ros's children fought in the last period of the Hundred Years' War. John, his heir, was born in 1397 and was legally a minor when de Ros died. The Earl of Dorset, the king's cousin, received custody of the de Ros estates. Before he inherited, John travelled to France with the new king in 1415 and fought at the Battle of Agincourt at the age of seventeen or eighteen. He died in 1421 at the Battle of Baugé with the king's brother, Thomas, Duke of Clarence and Sir Gilbert V de Umfraville. William de Ros's second son Thomas was only fourteen at John's death, and fought with Thomas, Earl of Salisbury, at the siege of Orléans in 1428; he died after a skirmish outside Paris two years later. Thomas's heir (also named Thomas) inherited the lordship as ninth baron and played an important role in the Wars of the Roses fighting for the Lancastrian king, Henry VI; he was beheaded after his defeat by the Yorkists at the Battle of Hedgeley Moor in 1464. De Ros's wife, Margaret Fitzalan, lived until 1438. She had received her dower by February 1415 and, at the marriage of Henry V to Catherine of Valois in 1420, entered the new queen's service as a lady-in-waiting. Margaret attended Catherine's coronation and travelled with her to see Henry in France two years later.

=== Family and bequests ===
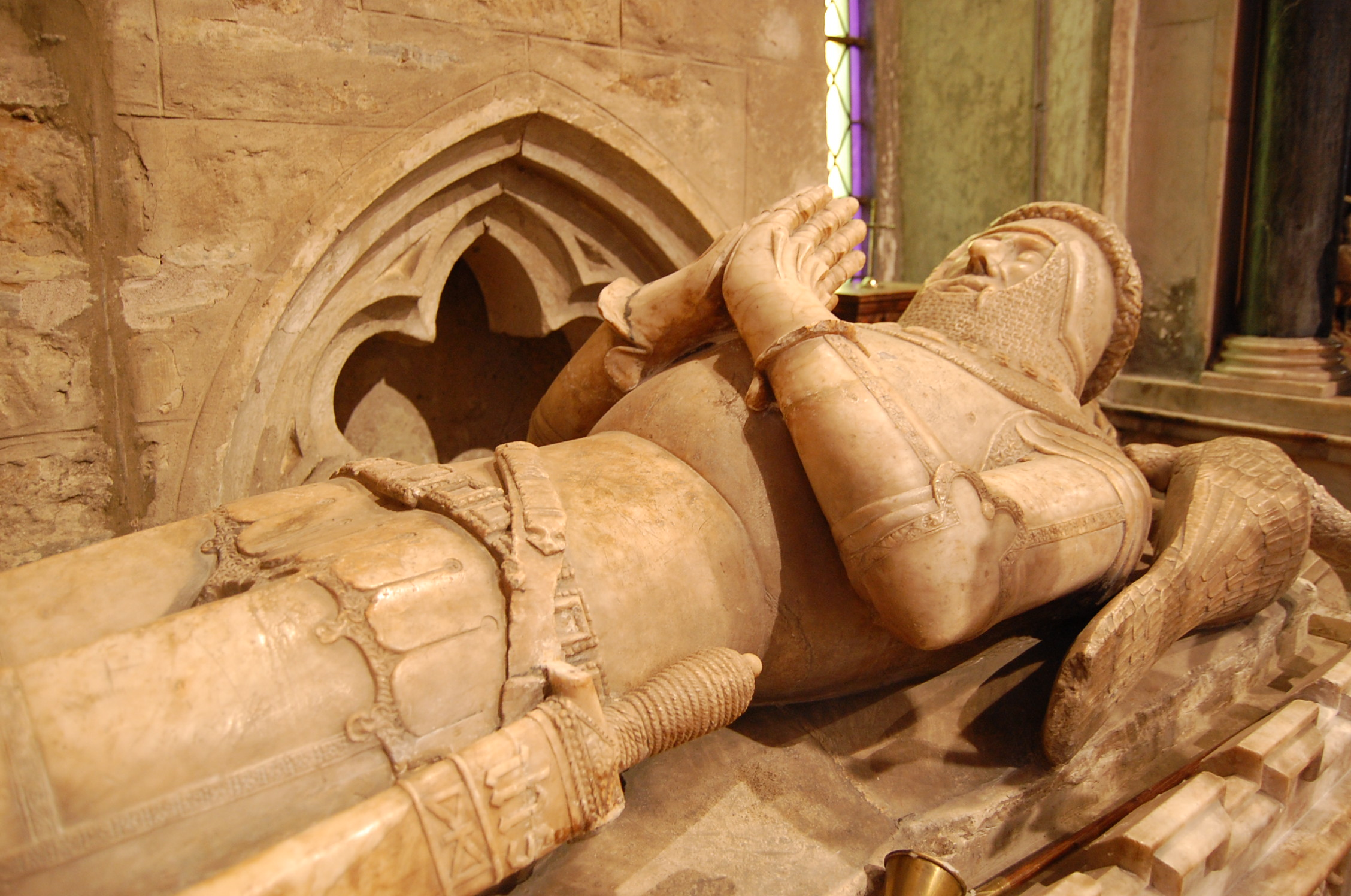
Alabaster effigy of William Ros in St Mary's Church, Bottesford

With his wife, Margaret Fitzalan, William de Ros had four sons: John, Thomas, Robert and Richard. They also had four daughters: Beatrice, Alice, Margaret and Elizabeth. (Note: Although Irvin Eller lists another son (William) between Robert and Richard, this is not confirmed by other sources.) De Ros also had an illegitimate son, John, by a now-unknown woman. Charles de Ross suggests that he "provides full confirmation of what the scanty evidence as to the character of his earlier career suggests, that de Ros was a man of just and equitable temperament" by the nature and extent of his bequests. His heir, John, inherited his father's lordship and patrimony and his armour and a gold sword. His third son, Robert—whom Ross describes as "evidently his favourite"—also inherited a quantity of land. De Ros made this provision for Robert from John's patrimony, a decision described by G. L. Harriss as "overrid[ing] both family duty and convention". His younger three sons (Thomas, Robert, and Richard) received a third of de Ros's goods among them; Thomas, traditional for a younger son, was intended for an ecclesiastical career. Margaret received another third of his goods. His illegitimate son, John, received £40 towards his upkeep. Loyal retainers received benefices, and de Ros's "humbler dependents"—for instance, the poor on his Lincolnshire estates—received often-massive sums among them. (Note: For instance, three groups of dependents (the poor on his estates, his servants, and his tenants) received £100 per group.) His executors—one of whom was his heir, John—received £20 each for their services. De Ros was buried in Belvoir Priory, and an alabaster effigy was erected in St Mary the Virgin's Church, Bottesford, on the right side of the altar. Seven years later, after his death at Baugé, an effigy of his son John was placed on the left. De Ros left £400 to pay ten chaplains for eight years to educate his sons.

== In Shakespeare ==
William de Ros appears in William Shakespeare's Richard II as Lord Ross. His character performs a double act of sorts with Lord Willoughby in their (ultimately successful) attempts to persuade the Earl of Northumberland to revolt against Richard, although as one reviewer has noted, indicating "little sense of rebels carefully testing the political water" before doing so. Together, the three of them are the core of the conspiracy to overthrow Richard. In their colloquies—for which R. F. Hill has compared them to a Senecan Chorus— they provide the audience with a catalogue of Richard's misdeeds by re-telling his history of poor governance. Lord Ross, says Hill, is "lured" by the earl into conversation, which results in their plotting. Lord Ross tells Northumberland, "The commons hath [King Richard] pill'd with grievous taxes / And quite lost their hearts: the nobles hath he fined / For ancient quarrels, and quite lost their hearts" and is portrayed as an overt follower of Henry Bolingbroke from the beginning. Shakespeare has this discussion take place in the north; (Note: Indeed, the 1990 ESC film portrays Lord Ross as wearing tartan as a means of suggesting that he is Scottish.) in this way, says Hill, their separation from the King emphasises their geographical closeness to Bolingbroke.

The speed with which Lord Ross deserts Richard and joins Henry is in stark contrast to the themes of loyalty and honour that the play deals with, suggests Margaret Shewring. Described by Shakespeare (based on Raphael Holinshed's chronicle) as "fiery-red with haste", Lord Ross joins Bolingbroke at Berkeley, Gloucestershire. In 1738—when the public image of the King, George I, was poor—the play was put on by John Rich, in the knowledge that it was "dangerously topical in terms of contemporary politics". The discussion between Lords Ross, Willoughby and Northumberland on the faults of the King—"basely led/by flatterers"—has been argued to have reflected contemporary disfavour with George, who was widely believed to be under the influence of his chief minister, Horace Walpole. A contemporary, Thomas Davies, watched the performance and later wrote how "almost every line that was spoken to the occurrences of the time, and to the measures and character of the ministry".

The text of Richard II is often cut by directors, either to tighten the plot or to avoid problems with weak casting, and the role of Lord Ross is occasionally omitted. For example, in the 1981 Bard Productions film, his lines were given to the Exton character, and in the Erickson-Farrell 2001 film, Lord Ross was one of seven characters dropped, his role again given to Exton. He has still been played by several actors in post-war performances. At the 1947 Avignon Festival, Pierre Lautrec played to Jean Vilar's Richard; Vilar also directed the play. The same year, Walter Hudd directed it with the Shakespeare Memorial Theatre (SMT) at Stratford-upon-Avon, with Joss Ackland as Lord Ross to Robert Harris's Richard. Four years later, Anthony Quayle—also with the SMT—directed Michael Redgrave as the King, Harry Andrews as Bolingbroke, and Philip Morant in the part of Lord Ross. In 1968 the Prospect Theatre toured Richard II in two legs. Directed by Richard Cottrell and with Ian McKellen and Timothy West as Richard and Bolingbroke respectively, Lord Ross was played by Peter Rocca on the first half of the tour and David Calder on the second. In 1973, Charles Keating played Lord Ross to Richard Pasco and Ian Richardson's king and Bolingbroke, (Note: Pasco and Richardson alternated the roles of both Richard and Bolingbroke between them; says critic Richard David, "of the two, the variation with Richard Pasco as Richard and Ian Richardson as Bolingbroke was the more ordinary".) in John Barton's production. Ariane Mnouchkine's 1984 production for the Théâtre du Soleil cast Robert Gourp as Lord Ross, and five years later the English Shakespeare Company's production—directed by Michael Bogdanov—had John Dougall play him to Michael Pennington's Richard. Keith Dunphy played Lord Ross in Steven Pimlott's RSC production in 2000, to Sam West's Richard and David Troughton's Bolingbroke. A production at the Globe Theatre in 2015 from Tim Carroll saw Mark Rylance as the King and Ekow Quartey as Lord Ross. Jonathan Slinger played the King in Michael Boyd's 2007 RSC production, and Rob Carroll played Lord Ross. Joshua Richards played him in Gregory Doran's 2013 production, with David Tennant in the lead role.

Government offices
Preceded by Guy Mone	Lord High Treasurer; 1403–1404	Succeeded by Lord Furnivall
Peerage of England
Preceded by John Ros	Baron Ros; 1394–1414	Succeeded by John Ros
