= William Ros, 3rd Baron Ros =

Arms of Ros: Gules, three water bougets argent

William Ros, 3rd Baron Ros of Helmsley (19 May 1329 – Bef. 29 September 1352) was a military commander under Edward III of England. He was knighted by the king in 1346, having helped raise the siege of Aiguillon. In the same year, he was one of the lords who led the second division in the Battle of Crécy, and afterwards commanded the fourth division of the English army against the Scots, near Neville's Cross, when David Bruce, with many of the Scottish nobles, was taken prisoner.

On July 12, 1346, he was among several young men (including Edward, the Black Prince) knighted by King Edward III of England at the church of St. Vigor in Quettehou in anticipation of their service in the campaign that was to culminate in the Battle of Crécy and the siege of Calais. A plaque commemorates this event.

In 1346, he was with Edward III and the Black Prince, at the siege of Calais, when it was taken by the English.

In 1352, he accompanied Henry of Grosmont, Duke of Lancaster on his journey to Prussia; but died the same year, before the feast of St Michael, aged twenty-three, and was buried abroad.

== Marriage ==
William Ros married, about 28 August 1349, Margaret Neville (d. May 1372), daughter of Ralph Neville, 2nd Baron Neville, by whom he had no issue.

His widow married secondly, as his first wife, Henry Percy, 1st Earl of Northumberland.

== Footnotes ==
Peerage of England
Preceded by William Ros	Baron Ros; 1342–1352	Succeeded by Thomas Ros
