= John Ros, 5th Baron Ros =

Arms of Ros: Gules, three water bougets argent

John Ros, 5th Baron Ros of Helmsley, KB (d. 6 August 1393) took a prominent part in the pageantry at the coronation of Richard II. Following the coronation, he was appointed Knight of the Order of the Bath. While on a pilgrimage to Jerusalem he died in Paphos, Cyprus. His body was returned and buried at Rievaulx Abbey.

John Ros married, before 22 June 1382, Mary de Percy (12 March 1367 – 25 August 1394), daughter of Henry Percy, 3rd Baron Percy and Joan Orreby; by whom he had no issue.

== Footnotes ==
Peerage of England
Preceded by Thomas Ros	Baron Ros; 1384–1393	Succeeded by William Ros
