= William Ros, 1st Baron Ros =

English noble

Arms of Ros: Gules, three water bougets argent

William Ros or Roos, 1st Baron Ros of Helmsley (c. 1255 – 6 or 8 August 1316), was one of the claimants of the crown of Scotland in 1292 during the reign of Edward I.

== Family ==
William Ros was the eldest son of Robert de Ros (d. 17 May 1285) of Helmsley, Yorkshire, and Isabel d'Aubigny (c. 1233 – 15 June 1301), daughter and heiress of William d'Aubigny of Belvoir, Leicestershire, and granddaughter of William d'Aubigny. He had four brothers and three sisters:

- Sir Robert Ros of Gedney, Lincolnshire.
- John Ros.
- Nicholas Ros, a cleric.
- Peter Ros, a cleric.
- Isabel Ros, who married Walter Fauconberg, 2nd Baron Fauconberg.
- Joan Ros, who married John Lovel, 1st Baron Lovel, as his second wife.
- Mary Ros, who married William de Braose, 1st Baron Braose.

== Career ==
On 24 December 1264, William's father, Robert de Ros (d. 1285), was summoned to Simon de Montfort's Parliament in London as Robert de Ros, and for some time it was considered that the barony was created by writ in that year, and that Robert de Ros was the 1st Baron Ros. According to The Complete Peerage:

In 1616, the barony of Ros was allowed precedence from this writ [of 24 December 1264], a decision adopted by the Lords in 1806 (Round, Peerage and Pedigree, vol. i, pp. 249-50); but these writs, issued by Simon in the King's name, are no longer regarded as valid for the creation of peerages.

Accordingly, the barony is now considered to have been created when William Ros was summoned to Parliament from 6 February 1299 to 16 October 1315 by writs directed Willelmo de Ros de Hamelak.

William Ros succeeded to the family honours and estates on the death of his mother. He was an unsuccessful competitor for the crown of Scotland, founding his claim on his descent from his great-grandmother, Isabel, a bastard daughter of William I of Scotland. He was buried at Kirkham Priory. He was involved in the wars of Gascony and Scotland. He discovered that his kinsman Robert de Ros, Lord of Werke, intended to give up his castle to the Scots. William notified the king of this, who sent him with a thousand men to defend that place. The place was then forfeited because of the treason of Robert de Ros. William Ros then took possession of it. William was appointed warden of the west Marches of Scotland.

Through his marriage to Maud de Vaux, the patronage of Penteney and Blakeney Priories in Norfolk and of Frestun in Lincolnshire came into the Ros family.

== Marriage and issue ==
William Ros married before 1287 Maud de Vaux (born c. 1261), younger daughter and coheiress of John de Vaux, by his 2nd wife, Sibyl, by whom he had four sons and four daughters.

- William Ros, 2nd Baron Ros.
- Sir John Ros (d. before 16 November 1338), who married Margaret de Goushill (d. 29 July 1349).
- Thomas Ros.
- George Ros.
- Agnes Ros, who married firstly Sir Pain de Tibetot, and secondly Sir Thomas de Vere.
- Alice Ros, who married Sir Nicholas de Meinill. Their daughter, Elizabeth de Meinill, married Sir John Darcy, 2nd Lord Darcy of Knayth.
- Margaret Ros.
- Lucy Ros.

== Bibliography ==
- Cokayne, George Edward (1949). The Complete Peerage, edited by Geoffrey H. White. Vol. XI. London: St. Catherine Press.
- Richardson, Douglas (2011). Magna Carta Ancestry: A Study in Colonial and Medieval Families, ed. Kimball G. Everingham. Vol. I (2nd ed.). Salt Lake City. ISBN 1449966373
- Richardson, Douglas (2011). Magna Carta Ancestry: A Study in Colonial and Medieval Families, ed. Kimball G. Everingham. Vol. III (2nd ed.). Salt Lake City. ISBN 144996639X

Peerage of England
| New creation | Baron Ros; 1299–1316 | Succeeded by William Ros |
