= William Ros, 2nd Baron Ros =

English admiral (1285–1343)

Arms of Ros: Gules, three water bougets argent

William Ros, 2nd Baron Ros of Helmsley, sometime spelled William Roos (c. 1285 – 3 February 1343) was the son of William Ros, 1st Baron Ros and Maud de Vaux.

== Biography ==
As 2nd Baron Ros of Helmsley, Werke, Trusbut & Belvoir, he was summoned to Parliament during the reigns of Edward II and Edward III of England. In 1321 he completed the religious foundation which his father had begun at Blakeney. He was created Lord Ross of Werke. He was appointed Lord High Admiral and was one of the commissioners with the Archbishop of York, and others, to negotiate peace between the king and Robert de Bruce, who had assumed the title of king of Scotland.

William Ros was buried at Kirkham Priory, near the great altar.

== Family ==
William Ros married, before 25 November 1316, Margery Badlesmere (c.1306 – 18 October 1363), eldest daughter of Bartholomew Badlesmere, 1st Baron Badlesmere, with Margaret, daughter of Sir Thomas de Clare, with whom he had two sons and three daughters:

- William, who succeeded his father as Baron.
- Thomas, who succeeded his brother as Baron.
- Margaret, who married Sir Edward de Bohun.
- Maud, who married John de Welles, 4th Baron Welles.
- Elizabeth, who married William la Zouche, 2nd Baron Haryngworth.

Maud survived her husband by many years and was one of the very few English people present at the Jubilee, at Rome, in 1350; the king had tried to prevent the attendance of his subjects at this ceremony on account of the large sums of money usually taken out of the kingdom on such occasions.

== Bibliography ==
- Cokayne, George Edward (1949). The Complete Peerage, edited by Geoffrey H. White. Vol. XI. London: St. Catherine Press.
- Richardson, Douglas (2011). Everingham, Kimball G. (ed.). Magna Carta Ancestry: A Study in Colonial and Medieval Families. Vol. I (2nd ed.). Salt Lake City. ISBN 978-1449966379.
- Richardson, Douglas (2011). Everingham, Kimball G. (ed.). Magna Carta Ancestry: A Study in Colonial and Medieval Families. Vol. III (2nd ed.). Salt Lake City. ISBN 978-1449966393.

Peerage of England
Preceded by William Ros	Baron Ros; 1317–1342	Succeeded by Willam Ros
