= Thomas Ros, 4th Baron Ros =

English nobleman (1335–1384)

Arms of de Ros: Gules, three water bougets argent

Thomas Ros, 4th Baron Ros of Helmsley (13 January 1335 – 8 June 1384) was the son of William Ros, 2nd Baron Ros and Margery de Badlesmere.

In 1364, he accompanied the king of Cyprus to the Holy Land; and was in the French wars, from 1369 to 1371. He was summoned to parliament by both King Edward III of England and King Richard II of England. He died at Uffington, Lincolnshire, on 8 June 1384, and was buried at Rievaulx Abbey. His widow became the wife of Sir Richard Burley.

== Marriage and issue ==
Thomas Ros married 12 April 1363, Beatrice Stafford (d. 13 April 1415), daughter of Ralph Stafford, 1st Earl of Stafford, by whom he had four sons and two daughters:

- John Ros, 5th Baron Ros.
- William Ros, 6th Baron Ros.
- Thomas Ros.
- Robert Ros.
- Elizabeth Ros, who married Thomas Clifford, 6th Baron Clifford.
- Margaret Ros, who married Reynold Grey, 3rd Baron Grey of Ruthin.

== Bibliography ==
- Cokayne, George Edward (1949). The Complete Peerage, edited by Geoffrey H. White. Vol. XI. London: St. Catherine Press.
- Richardson, Douglas (2011). Magna Carta Ancestry: A Study in Colonial and Medieval Families, ed. Kimball G. Everingham. Vol. I (2nd ed.). Salt Lake City. ISBN 1449966373
- Richardson, Douglas (2011). Magna Carta Ancestry: A Study in Colonial and Medieval Families, ed. Kimball G. Everingham. Vol. III (2nd ed.). Salt Lake City. ISBN 144996639X

Peerage of England
Preceded by William Ros	Baron Ros; 1352–1384	Succeeded by John Ros
