= Manners (disambiguation) =

Manners are the codes of socially accepted behavior.

Manners may also refer to:

== People with the name ==
=== Alias ===
- Miss Manners, the pen name of American newspaper columnist Judith Martin

=== Surname ===
Several of the names below have a connection to the family of the Dukes of Rutland. The name is of the same origin as Menzies; both probably derive from the Norman name Mesnières, from the town of Mesnières-en-Bray in Normandy.

- Lady Alice Manners (born 1995), British socialite and columnist
- Archie Manners (born 1993), British magician, comedian, and television presenter
- Lord Cecil Manners (1868–1945), British Conservative politician
- Charles Manners (disambiguation), several people
- David Manners (disambiguation), several people
- Lady Diana Cooper (1892–1986), née Manners, English socialite
- Dunlop Manners (1916–1994), English cricketer and British Army officer
- Edward Manners, 3rd Earl of Rutland (1548–1587)
- Eleanor Manners, Countess of Rutland (c. 1495–1551), lady-in-waiting to four of King Henry VIII's wives
- Elizabeth Cecil, 16th Baroness de Ros (c. 1574/75–1591), née Manners
- Lord Edward Manners (1864–1903), British politician and army officer
- Emma Manners, Duchess of Rutland (born 1963), British podcaster
- Frances Manners (1753–1792), Countess of Tyrconnel
- Francis Manners, 6th Earl of Rutland (1578–1632)
- George Manners (disambiguation), several people
- Henry Manners, 2nd Earl of Rutland (1526–1563)
- Henry Manners, 8th Duke of Rutland (1852–1925), British politician
- Jack Manners (Canadian football) (born c. 1915), Canadian Football League player
- J. Hartley Manners (1870–1928), British playwright
- John Manners (disambiguation), several people
- Katherine Villiers, Duchess of Buckingham (died 1649), née Manners, richest woman in Britain apart from royalty
- Katherine Manners, British actress and playwright
- Kathleen Manners, Duchess of Rutland (1894–1989), British aristocrat
- Kim Manners (1951–2009), American television producer, director and actor
- Rennison Manners (1904–1944), Canadian National Hockey League player
- Robert Manners (disambiguation), several people
- Roger Manners (disambiguation), several people
- Russell Manners (disambiguation), several people
- Sarah Manners (born 1975), English actress
- Lord Sherard Manners (c. 1713–1742), English nobleman and Member of Parliament
- Thomas Manners (disambiguation), several people
- Lord William Manners (1697–1772), English nobleman and Member of Parliament
- Zeke Manners (1911–2000), American country musician
- George Manners-Sutton (1751–1804), British politician
- Lady Violet Manners (born 1993), British socialite and model

== Music ==
- Manners (album), a 2009 album by Passion Pit
- "Manners", a children's song about having good manners sung on Barney & Friends
- "Manners", a 2011 single by Icona Pop
- "Manners", a song by Band-Maid from the 2021 album Unseen World

== Other uses ==
- Baron Manners, a title in the Peerage of the United Kingdom
- Manners (crater), on Mars
- HMS Manners, two ships of the British Royal Navy
- Comedy of manners

== See also ==
- Manner (disambiguation)
