= Manor House (disambiguation) =

A manor house is a type of historical building.

Manor House may also refer to:

== Specific buildings ==
=== In England, UK ===
==== Buildings named Manor House ====
Listed in alphabetical order of location.

- Manor House, 21 Soho Square, in central London
- The Manor House, Barmby Moor, in the East Riding of Yorkshire
- The Manor House, Castle Combe, in Wiltshire
- Manor House, Chew Magna, in Somerset
- The Manor House, Chipperfield, in Hertfordshire
- Manor House, Gisburn Forest, in Lancashire
- Manor House, Hale, in Cheshire
- Manor House, Raunds, in Northamptonshire
- The Manor House, Sedgefield, in County Durham
- Manor House, Sleaford, in Lincolnshire
- Manor House, Sutton Courtenay, in Oxfordshire
- Manor House, West Coker, in Somerset
- Manor House, Worthington, in Greater Manchester

==== Buildings that are manor houses ====
Listed in alphabetical order of name.

- Alford Manor House in Lincolnshire
- Boston Manor House in the London Borough of Hounslow
- Burton Agnes Manor House in Yorkshire
- Chenies Manor House in Buckinghamshire
- Eastbury Manor House in the London Borough of Barking and Dagenham
- Mitford Old Manor House in Mitford, Northumberland
- Princes Risborough Manor House, in Buckinghamshire
- Widcombe Manor House in Bath

=== In other countries ===
Listed in alphabetical order of country name.

- Manor House School, Raheny in Raheny, Dublin, Ireland
- Manor House School, Cairo in Cairo, Egypt
- The Manor House, Kandy, a hotel in Sri Lanka
- Manor House (Chicago), Illinois, USA
- Manor House (Naples, Maine), in Maine, USA
- Manor House (Kenosha, Wisconsin), USA

== Places ==
=== In London, England, UK ===
- Manor House, London, a district on the border of the London Boroughs of Haringey and Hackney
- Manor House tube station, a station on the Piccadilly line of the London Underground

== Other uses ==
- The Manor Studio, a recording studio in Oxfordshire, England
- The Edwardian Country House, a UK Channel 4 mini-series, shown on PBS as Manor House
- The First Republic, a Czech drama TV series also airing as The Manor House

== See also ==
- Manor (disambiguation)
- House (disambiguation)
