= Manor =

Manor may refer to:

== Land ownership ==
- Manorialism or "manor system", the method of land ownership (or "tenure") in parts of medieval Europe, notably England
- Lord of the manor, the owner of an agreed area of land (or "manor") under manorialism
- Manor house, the main residence of the lord of the manor
- Estate (land), the land (and buildings) that belong to large house, synonymous with the modern understanding of a manor.
- Manor (in Colonial America), a form of tenure restricted to certain Proprietary colonies
- Manor (in 17th-century Canada), the land tenure unit under the Seigneurial system of New France
- In modern British colloquialism, the territory of a criminal gang

== Places ==
- Manor railway station, a former railway station in Victoria, Australia
- Manor, Saskatchewan, Canada
- Manorcunningham, County Donegal, Ireland, a village, known locally as 'Manor'
- Manor, India, a census town in Palghar District, Maharashtra
- The Manor, a luxury neighborhood in Western Hanoi, Vietnam

=== United Kingdom ===
- Manor (Barking and Dagenham ward), a former electoral ward of Barking and Dagenham London Borough Council that existed from 1965 to 2002
- Manor (Brent ward), a former electoral ward of Brent London Borough Council that existed from 1965 to 2002
- Manor (Hillingdon ward), a former electoral ward of Hillingdon London Borough Council that existed from 1965 to 2022
- Manor (Sefton ward), a municipal borough of Sefton ward, Merseyside, England
- Manor (Stockport electoral ward), electoral ward of Metropolitan Borough of Stockport
- Manor, Scottish Borders, a parish in Peeblesshire, Scotland
- Manor, South Yorkshire, an electoral ward of Sheffield, England
- Manor (Trafford ward), Greater Manchester
- Manors railway station, a railway station in Newcastle-upon-Tyne
- Manor House (ward), a former electoral ward of Bromley London Borough Council that existed from 1965 to 1978

=== United States ===
- Manor, California, an unincorporated community in the state of California
- Manor, Georgia, an unincorporated community in Ware County in the state of Georgia (it is pronounced with long "a")
- Manor, Ohio, a largely uninhabited area in the state of Ohio
- Manor, Pennsylvania, a borough
- Manor St. George, a tract of land on Long Island, New York
- Manor, Texas, a city and suburb of Austin
- Manor Township, Armstrong County, Pennsylvania, a township in the state of Pennsylvania
- Manor Township, Lancaster County, Pennsylvania, a township in the state of Pennsylvania
- Manorville, New York, a hamlet within Manor St. George

== People with the name ==
- James B. Manor (1804-1881), namesake of Manor, Texas
- Brison Manor (1952–2023), American football player
- Ehud Manor (1941–2005), Israeli songwriter, translator, and radio and TV personality
- Leroy J. Manor (1921–2021), United States Air Force Lieutenant General and pilot
- Manor Solomon (born 1999), Israeli international association footballer
- Natasha Manor, Israeli actress

== Other uses ==
- Manor (department store), in Switzerland
- Manor Class or GWR 7800 Class, a class of Great Western Railway engines
- Manor Farm, the setting for the story Animal Farm by George Orwell
- Manor Motorsport, a British motor racing team
- Manor Racing, a British Formula One team
- Manor Records, a record label

== See also ==
- The Manor (disambiguation)
- Manor House (disambiguation)
- Manor High School (disambiguation)
- Manors railway station, Newcastle upon Tyne, England
- Manors Metro station, Newcastle upon Tyne, England
- Manner (disambiguation)
- Manners (disambiguation)
