= Mansfield Woodhouse =

Town in Nottinghamshire, England

Coordinates: 53.16°N 1.19°W

- Town
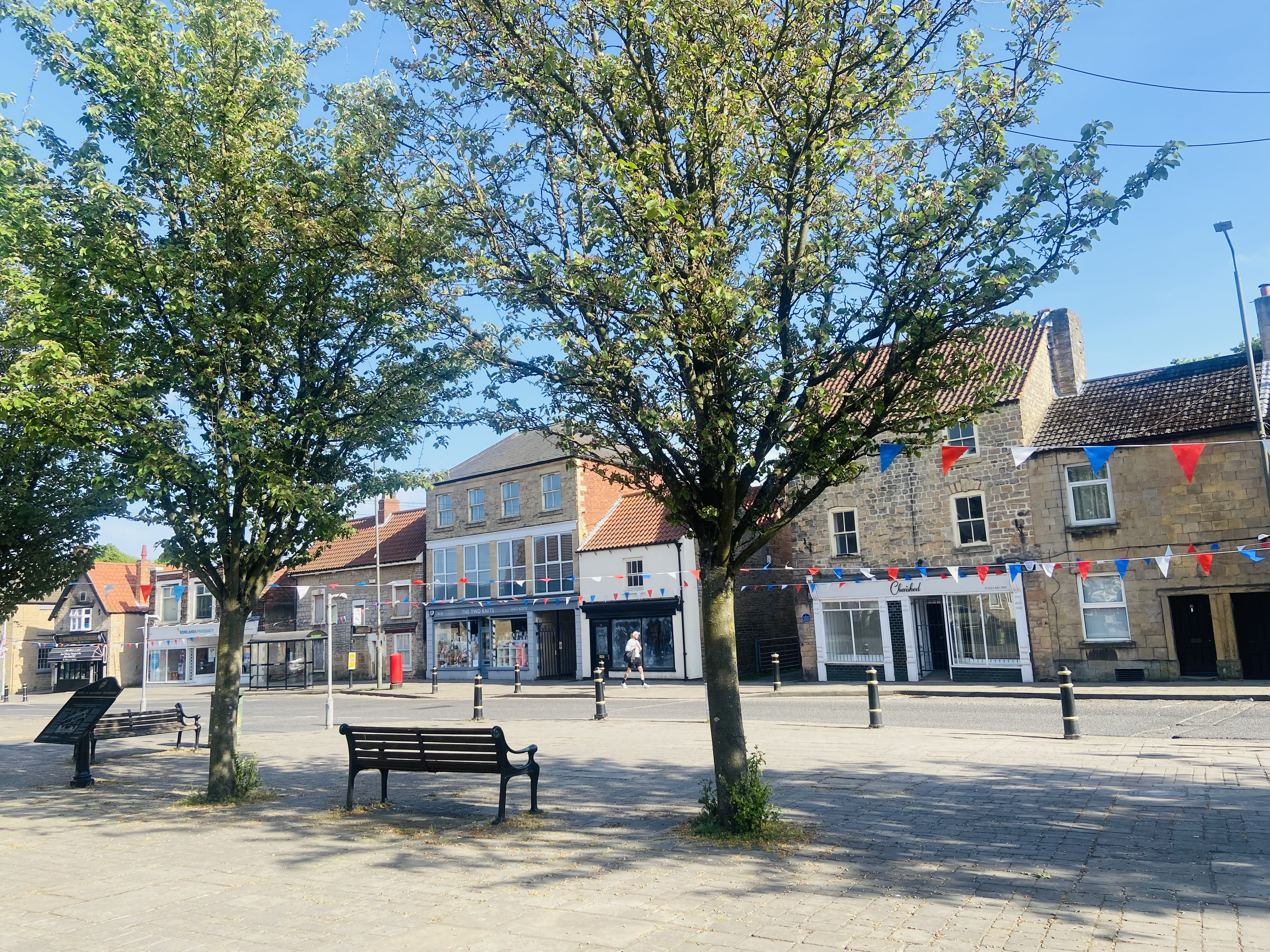
- Market Place and High Street

- Location within Nottinghamshire
- OS grid reference: SK540632
- District: Mansfield
- Shire county: Nottinghamshire
- Region: East Midlands
- Country: England
- Sovereign state: United Kingdom
- Post town: Mansfield
- Postcode district: NG19
- Dialling code: 01623
- Police: Nottinghamshire
- Fire: Nottinghamshire
- Ambulance: East Midlands
- UK Parliament: Mansfield
- Website: https://www.mansfield.gov.uk/

Mansfield Woodhouse is a town and civil parish in the Mansfield District of Nottinghamshire, England. It is about 1 mile (1.6 km) north of Mansfield, along the main A60 road in a wide, low valley between the Rivers Maun and Meden. Founded before the Roman Empire, it is noteworthy for its stone-built centre.

Originally separate with its own urban district council, after continuous development it has become a part of the Mansfield Urban Area. After the Local Government Act 1972, Mansfield Woodhouse and Warsop Urban District Councils merged with the Municipal Borough of Mansfield on 1 April 1974, to form a new local government area known as Mansfield. Mansfield Woodhouse's economy was traditionally based on the quarrying, mining, farming and textile industries.

== History ==
=== Roman Period ===
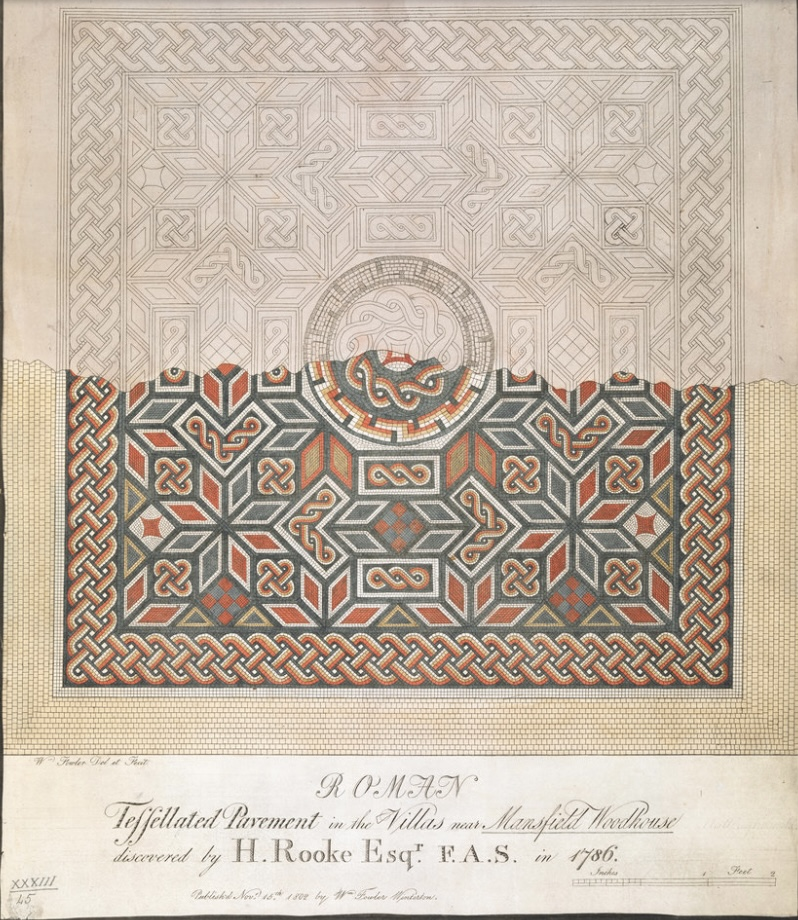
The Roman tessellated pavement found in Mansfield Woodhouse

The Romans had a fortress and a civilian settlement in the area (remains of two Roman Villas were found here by Major Hayman Rooke in the 1780s). A Roman tessellated pavement was found in one of the villas near Mansfield Woodhouse.

=== 13th and 14th Centuries ===
The area declined after the Romans left but by the 13th century, there was a growing settlement of smallholders.

Off the road to Edwinstowe, Peafield Lane, stands the Parliament Oak, which, according to legend, was once the location of a session of Parliament held by King John and Edward I. There is a commemorative plaque.

On 12 September 1304, fire destroyed the settlement, including its timber-framed church. The settlement was rebuilt using local materials and the new stone-built church, Church of St Edmund, still stands.

=== Tudor/Stuart Times ===
The town recovered and by Tudor times, was home to a number of wealthy families. Farming and quarrying were the main livelihoods.

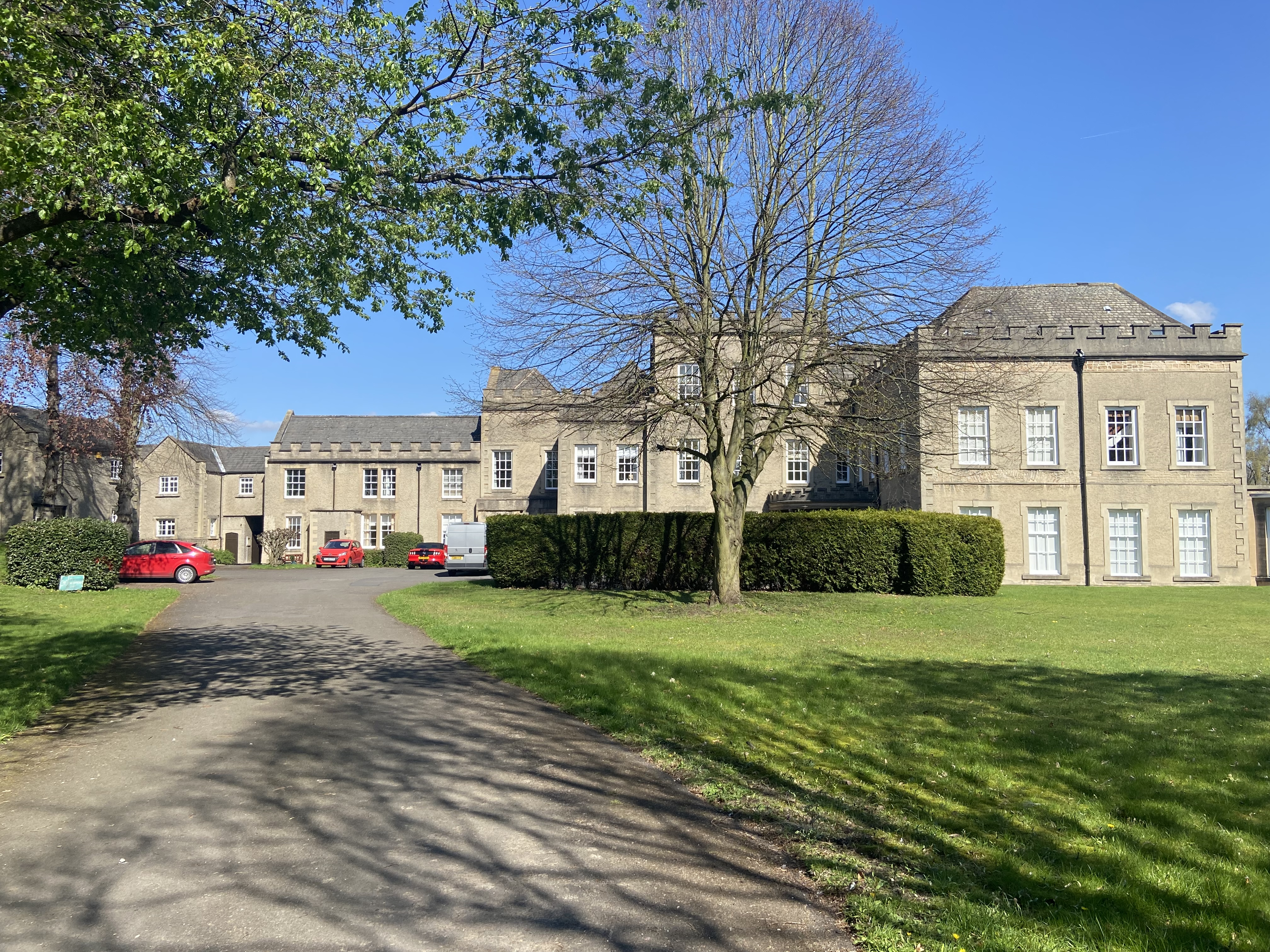
The Manor, Mansfield Woodhouse

The Manor House (which used to be known as the castle) was formally the home of the Digby family. In 1589, John Digby married Elizabeth Slaughter, the daughter of Margaret, the half sister of Bess of Hardwick Countess of Shrewsbury. Elizabeth had a close relationship with Bess and was one of Bess's trusted ladies in waiting. On the birth of Elizabeth's baby both Bess and Lady Arbella Stuart gave gifts.

George Fox the founder of the Quakers visited the Church of St Edmund in 1649. He tried to preach in the church but was severely beaten, placed in the stocks at cross hill for a time, then stoned out of the village.

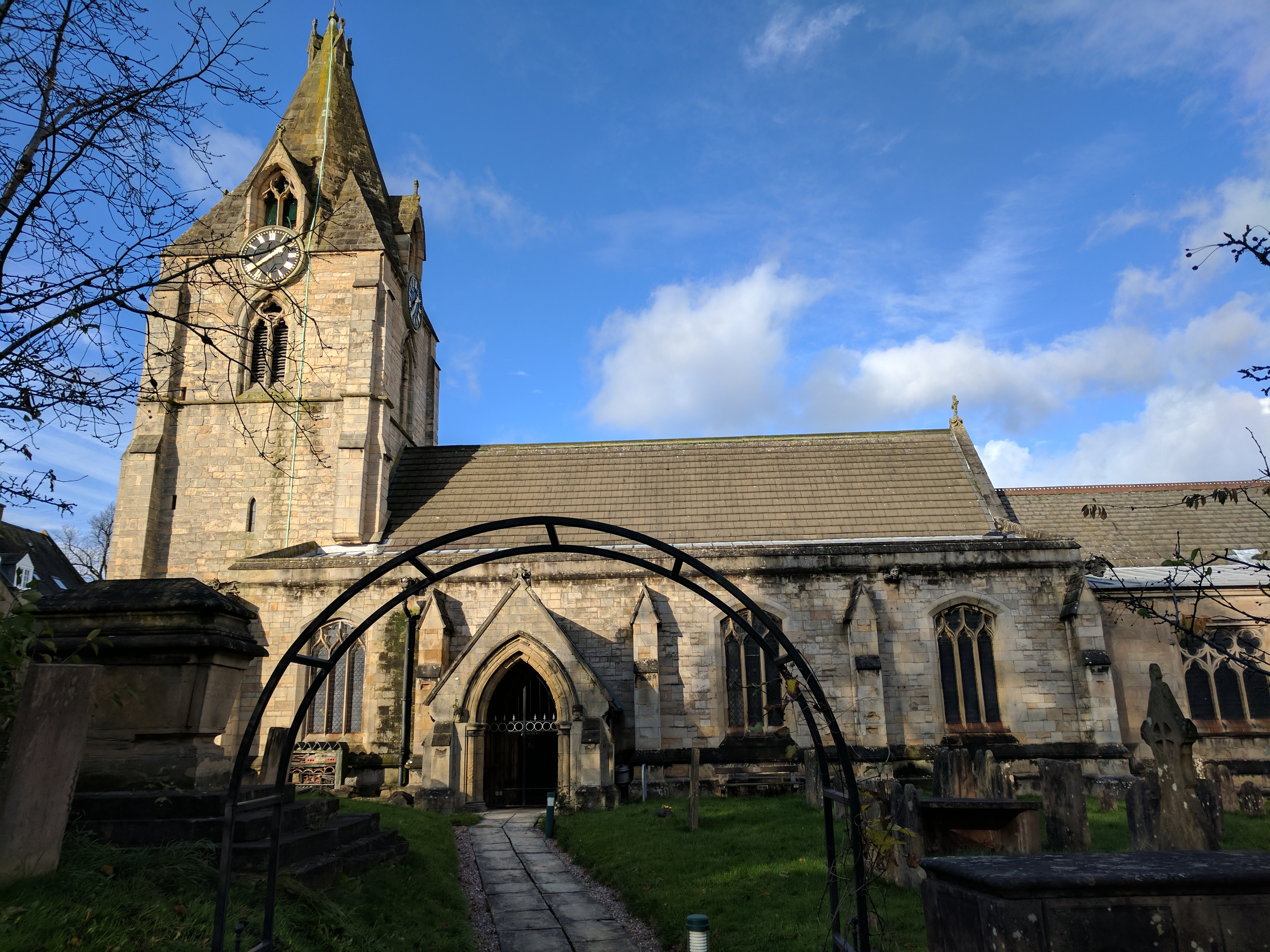
St Edmunds Church

=== 18th Century ===
Major Hayman Rooke lived at Woodhouse Place in Mansfield Woodhouse, but originally was from the City of Westminster, London. In 1790 he discovered the Major Oak, a tree in Sherwood Forest.

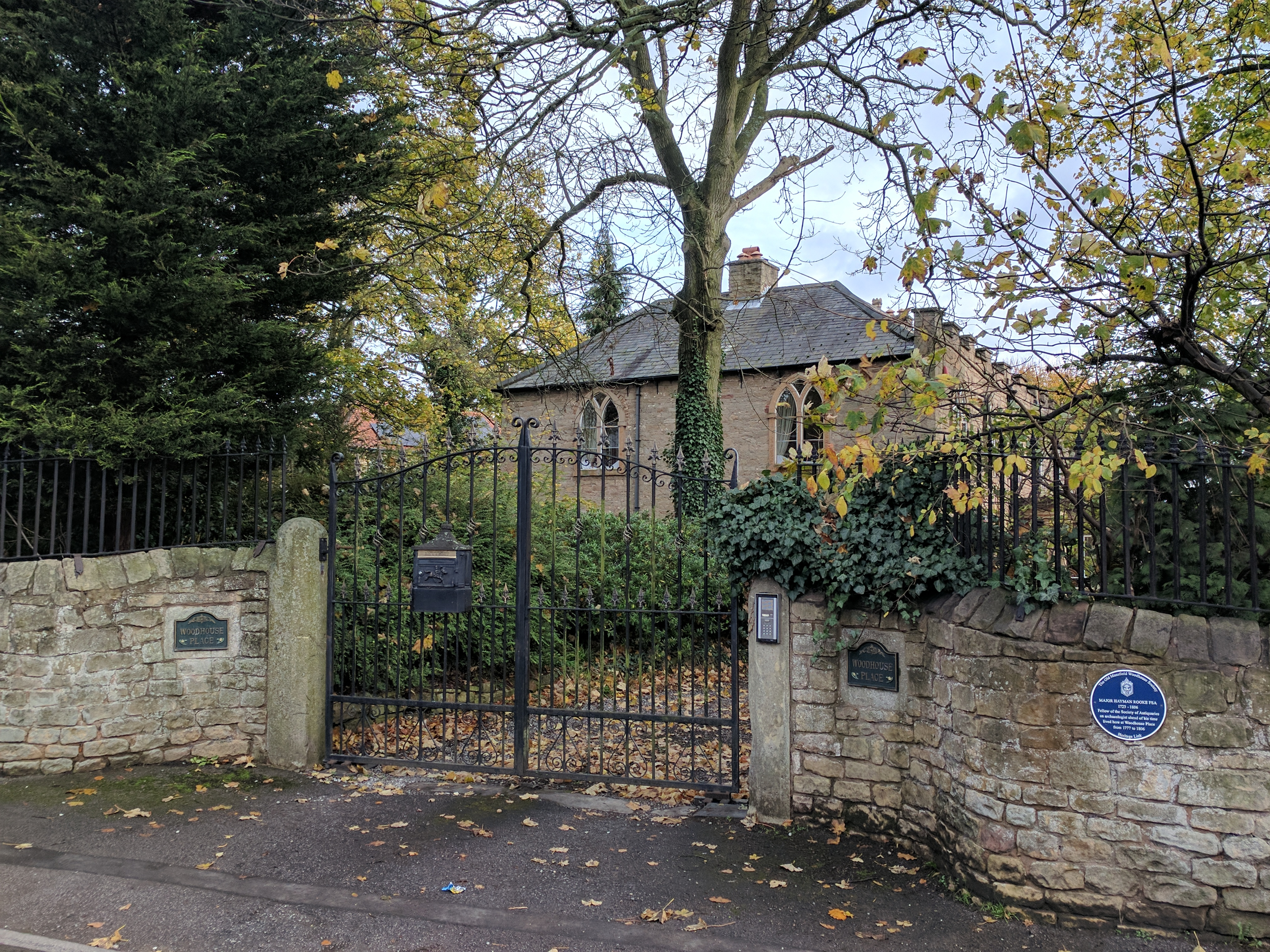
Former Home of Major Hayman Rooke

=== 19th Century ===
Mansfield Woodhouse also prospered with the growth of the textile and hosiery trades into the 19th century.

In 1816 the church steeple at St Edmunds Church was damaged by an earthquake, which necessitated repairs.

In 1839, the designer of the present Houses of Parliament, Sir Charles Barry, selected a sand-coloured magnesian limestone as the stone that would be used in its construction. This was quarried in Anston, South Yorkshire as well as in Mansfield Woodhouse.

Remains of the Old Market Cross on Church Street, a scheduled ancient monument originally dating from circa 1300.

== Today ==
The town was recorded as having a population of 18,500 according to the 2011 census.

It has a number of schools; the larger primary schools are St. Edmund's Church of England Primary School, Northfield Primary and Nursery School, Peafield Lane Academy, Leas Park Junior School and Nettleworth Primary and Nursery School.

The largest school is The Manor Academy; originally a grammar school (opened in 1959), it merged with Forest View Secondary Modern (opened 1956 – both at Park Hall Road) and Yorke Street Secondary Modern to form a comprehensive school, opened in September 1973. The Yorke Street building was about a mile away to the south.

After a fire in 1996, the Park Hall Road buildings were enlarged during rebuilding to incorporate the former Yorke Street facility, which was sold for housing land. Near the school is The Manor Sport and Recreation Centre, a former public amenity which forms part of the school's facilities.

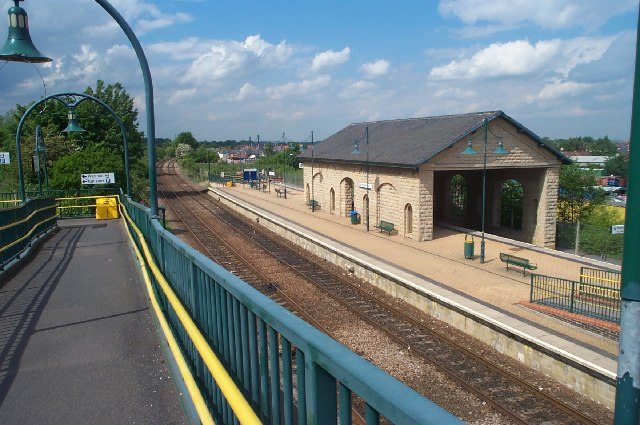
Mansfield Woodhouse Station

The Co-op store in Mansfield Woodhouse was opened in late 1984, and closed in January 2009. The building was transformed into the then-386th Morrisons store, formally opened in June 2009 by Tony Egginton, then Mansfield's Executive Mayor. The locality is being redeveloped in other areas, including replacement of the older terraced housing around Thoresby Road, near the railway station and from Sherwood Street–Blake Street with new housing estates. A new-build police station served the area since 2007, but was earmarked for closure in 2013 by Nottinghamshire Police Commissioner Paddy Tipping. In use by police until 2017, it was sold in 2019 for around a third of the new-build cost.

The town is served by Mansfield Woodhouse railway station, on the Robin Hood Line.

The town also has a volunteer-run newsletter called The Woodhouse Warbler, produced quarterly since late 2000, with a circulation in the thousands. It also produced a magazine collating locals' Second World War memories, funded by the Big Lottery Fund.

== Recreation ==
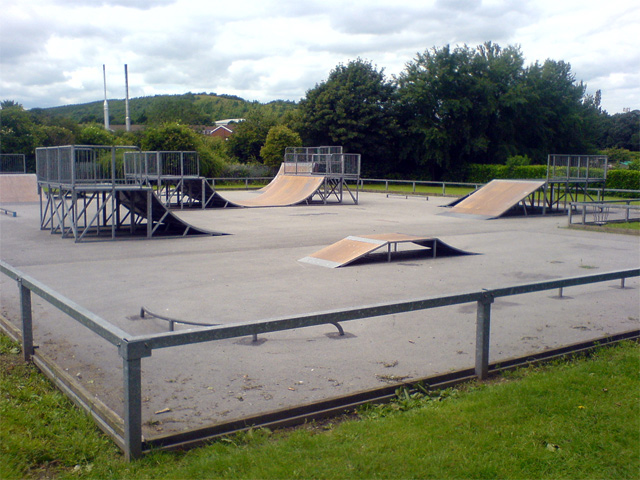
Skate area at Yeoman Hill Park

Yeoman Hill Park was created on land given in 1914 by the then-Duke of Portland, to celebrate his silver wedding anniversary and his son's 21st birthday. After a £30K revamp, it was awarded Green Flag status in 2014.

The Manor Sport and Recreation Centre is a £1.9 million indoor and outdoor sports facility opened on 11 May 2002, largely funded by a £1.4 million Sport England Sports Lottery grant, with the remainder from a variety of organisations and sponsors. The Manor Sport and Recreation Centre is not open to the public and is privately owned by The Manor Academy for their students to use.

First mooted by Mansfield District Council advertising for volunteer organisers in August 2012, a weekly running event was envisaged in collaboration with Nottinghamshire County Council and Manor Academy.

From 29 September 2012 the Manor Park, adjacent to the Sports complex accessed from Kingsley Avenue, has regularly hosted a Park Run – an informal, timed 5 kilometres (3.1 mi) fun-run for any class of participant.

The town also has its own non league football club, Sherwood Colliery F.C. who play in the United Counties League Premier Division North at Debdale Park.

Mansfield Woodhouse is known around Nottinghamshire for its junior football clubs: Woodhouse Colts JFC and Manor 4th FC, both of which offer football to youngsters from 6 to 18.

Mansfield Woodhouses' and Manor Parks newest sports club addition is the Sherwood Wolf Hunt Youth Rugby League teams, offering Boys and Girls Rugby League from 12–18 and play in the Midlands and Hull leagues respectively.

Speedway racing, then known as dirt track racing, took place at Mansfield Woodhouse in the pioneer days of 1928.

== Industrial Revolution ==
During the UK miners' strike, some coal miners at nearby Sherwood Colliery on the edge of Mansfield Woodhouse continued working, a decision made with members and officials as part of the Union of Democratic Mineworkers, a breakaway from the National Union of Mineworkers. The pit closed in 1992. The Colliery's football and cricket teams carry on through Sherwood Colliery Football Club and Sherwood Colliery Cricket Club, with the former swimming pool that was part of the original pit head baths complex being renamed as Rebecca Adlington Swimming Centre in 2010.

== Notable people ==
Natives of Mansfield Woodhouse include D'Ewes Coke (1747–1811), an unusual combination of clergyman and colliery master, and the pianist and composer John Ogdon (1937–89). Bill Wyman, former Rolling Stones bassist, was an evaccuee from London to Mansfield Woodhouse during the Second World War.
