= Manner =

Manner may refer to:

== Concepts ==
- Manner (philosophy), a philosophical concept
- Manner of (art), a term for art like that of, but not by, a famous artist
- Manner of articulation, a concept in linguistics
- Mannerism, also known as Late Renaissance, is a style in European art
- Manners, conduct in terms of etiquette

== Specifics ==
- Manner Culture, a Macau entertainment company
- Manner (confectionery), a brand of confectionery from the Austrian conglomerate, Josef Manner & Comp AG
- Manner (surname)
- Manner, an album by the Finnish pop-rock band Scandinavian Music Group

== See also ==
- Männer (disambiguation)
- Mannerheim (disambiguation)
- Manners (disambiguation)
- Manor (disambiguation)
