= Manor High School =

Manor High School may refer to:

== England ==
- Manor High School, Oadby, Leicestershire
- St Michael's Church of England High School, Crosby (formerly Manor High School), Merseyside
- The Manor School (formerly Manor Comprehensive) in Mansfield Woodhouse, Nottinghamshire

== United States ==
- Bohemia Manor High School, Chesapeake City, Maryland
- Eastport-South Manor Central School District, New York
- Mountain Manor, a high school in Baltimore, Maryland
- Penn Manor High School, Millersville, Pennsylvania
- Woodrow Wilson High School (Portsmouth, Virginia), formerly known as Manor High School
- Manor High School, Manor, Texas

== See also ==
- Manor (disambiguation)
- Minor High School, Adamsville, Alabama
