= Listed buildings in Halton, Cheshire =

The following articles contain lists of listed buildings in the borough of Halton in Cheshire, England:

- Listed buildings in Hale, Halton
- Listed buildings in Runcorn (rural area)
- Listed buildings in Runcorn (urban area)
- Listed buildings in Widnes
