= Hale, Cheshire =

Hale, Cheshire could refer to two places:

- Hale, Greater Manchester (historically in Cheshire)
- Hale, Halton (historically in Lancashire)
