= The Manor =

The Manor may refer to:

== Places ==
=== Australia ===
- The Manor, Mosman, a large 1911 house in the Sydney suburb of Mosman

=== England ===
- The Manor (Cambridgeshire), a house built in the 1130s
- The Manor Studio, a recording studio in Shipton-on-Cherwell, Oxfordshire
- Manor Ground (Oxford), former home ground of Oxford United F.C., known colloquially as The Manor

=== United States ===
- The Manor (Los Angeles), constructed in 1988; the largest home in Los Angeles County
- The Manor (Bishopville, South Carolina), Tisdale House, a historic home built between 1914 and 1918
- The Manor (West Virginia), Peter and Jesse Hutton Farm, a historic home located near Petersburg built about 1830
- The Manor (Glen Cove, New York), constructed in 1910
- The Manor (Bozeman, Montana), a household of ski bums established in 2022

== Media ==
- The Manor (film), a 2021 horror film
- The Manor (2024 film), a 2024 film directed by Au Cheuk-man
- The Manor (novel), a 1967 novel by Isaac Bashevis Singer
- The Manor, a place central to the anime series Noir

== See also ==
- Manor (disambiguation)
- Manse
