= Listed buildings in Barmby Moor =

Barmby Moor is a civil parish in the county of the East Riding of Yorkshire, England. It contains eight listed buildings that are recorded in the National Heritage List for England. Of these, two are listed at Grade II*, the middle of the three grades, and the others are at Grade II, the lowest grade. The parish contains the village of Barmby Moor and the surrounding countryside, and the listed buildings consist of houses, a church, a hotel and a milestone.

== Key ==
Grade	Criteria
II*	Particularly important buildings of more than special interest
II	Buildings of national importance and special interest

== Buildings ==
Name and location	Photograph	Date	Notes	Grade
St Catherine's Church; 53.93078°N 0.81896°W		15th century	The oldest part of the church is the steeple, the rest of the church being rebuilt in 1850–52. The church is built in stone with a slate roof, and consists of a nave, a projection to the south door, a chancel and a west steeple. The steeple has a tower with two stages, a slit window, two-light bell openings, and an embattled parapet with crocketed corner finials. It is surmounted by a recessed spire with a cross finial.	II*
The Manor House; 53.93059°N 0.81686°W		1591	The house, which has been enlarged, is in stuccoed brick on a plinth, with rusticated quoins, giant rusticated pilasters, a moulded eaves cornice, and a hipped stone slate roof. The main front has two storeys and four bays. The entrance bay is rusticated, and contains a doorway with a moulded surround, panelled reveals and soffit, above which is a moulded cornice. The windows on the ground floor are tripartite sashes with channelled wedge lintels and keystones, and the upper floor contains horizontally sliding sash windows on moulded sills.	II*
Barmbyfield House; 53.93982°N 0.80635°W		Early 18th century	The house is in rendered and colourwashed red brick, with rusticated quoins, a floor band, a stepped brick eaves cornice, and a tile roof with raised coped gables and shaped kneelers. There are two storeys and three bays, the middle bay projecting slightly. This contains a doorway with a fanlight, and paired attached columns between which is floral pargeting, over which is a segmental pediment, also with pargeting. The windows are sashes with wedge lintels.	II
Barmby Moor House Hotel; 53.92910°N 0.81959°W	—	Late 18th century	Originally a coaching inn, it is in brown brick, with a floor band and a hipped slate roof. There are two storeys and three bays, the middle bay projecting slightly under a pediment. In the centre is a porch with fluted columns, a central stone owl, flanking side lights, and a doorway with a radial fanlight. Above the porch is a tripartite sash window, and the outer bays contain two-storey bow windows with sashes.	II
Laurels Farmhouse; 53.93166°N 0.81629°W	—	Late 18th century	The house is in orange brick, and has a pantile roof with raised gables. There are two storeys and three bays. The central doorway has a fluted architrave and a fanlight. The windows are sashes with wedge lintels.	II
The Laurels; 53.93172°N 0.81646°W	—	Late 18th century	The house is in colourwashed brick with a hipped slate roof. There are two storeys and three bays. The central doorway has pilasters and a fanlight, and the windows are sashes.	II
Milestone; 53.93696°N 0.85725°W		Early 19th century	The milestone is on the north side of Hull Road. It is in limestone and consists of three steps. On the front is a round-headed iron plate with the distances to Beverley and York.	II
Former gate-keepers' house 53.93953°N 0.80139°W	—	Mid-19th century	The house is in colourwashed brick and has a slate roof with oversailing eaves. There are two storeys and two bays, flanked by single-bay gabled cross-wings. The windows are sashes, and the doorway is on the right return.	II
