= Listed buildings in Hale, Halton =

Hale is a civil parish in the borough of Halton, Cheshire, England. The parish contains 17 buildings that are recorded in the National Heritage List for England as designated listed buildings. Of these, one is listed at Grade II*, the middle grade, and the others are at Grade II, the lowest grade. The parish includes the village of Hale, and this is surrounded by agricultural land. It is on the north bank of the River Mersey and includes the promontory of Hale Head. Almost all of the listed buildings are houses and cottages in the village, the others consisting of the parish church, an ice house in the grounds of the former Hale House (now demolished), and a former lighthouse on Hale Head.

== Key ==
Grade	Criteria
II*	Particularly important buildings of more than special interest
II	Buildings of national importance and special interest

== Buildings ==
name and location	Photograph	Date	Notes	Grade
St Mary's Church; 53.3325°N 2.7952°W		14th century	The tower dates from the 14th century, the rest of the church was uilt in 1754, the interior was fully restored in 1979–80 after a fire.	II
Manor House; 53.3339°N 2.7959°W		Mid-17th century	The house was originally built as a parsonage.	II*
22 High Street; 53.3357°N 2.8021°W		1665	A timber-framed cottage with a thatched roof.	II
32–34 Town Lane; 53.3376°N 2.7976°W		Late 17th century	A pair of brick-built cottages.	II
4–6 Hale Road; 53.3367°N 2.8051°W		Late 17th century	A pair of thatched lime-washed brick cottages.	II
14 Church End; 53.3339°N 2.7974°W		Late 17th century	A cottage, formerly timber-framed, now lime-washed brick with a thatched roof. Supposedly the birthplace of John Middleton, a giant known as the Childe of Hale.	II
16–20 Church End; 53.3337°N 2.7968°W		Late 17th century	A row of three cottages, formerly timber-framed, now lime-washed brick with thatched roofs.	II
Old School House, 4 High Street; 53.3363°N 2.8039°W		1739	A two-storey brick building surmounted by a cupola.	II
39–43 High Street; 53.3356°N 2.8008°W		18th century	Three joined brick buildings with a slate roof.	II
45–51 High Street; 53.3354°N 2.8004°W		18th century	A pair of lime-washed brick cottages with slate roofs.	II
46 High Street; 53.3352°N 2.8004°W		18th century	A lime-washed brick single-storey cottage with a stone plinth.	II
42–44 High Street; 53.3353°N 2.8006°W		18th century	Two joined lime-washed brick two-storey cottages.	II
2-2A Church End; 53.3349°N 2.7989°W		Mid-18th century	A lime-washed brick two-storey house.	II
38–40 High Street; 53.3354°N 2.8010°W		Late 18th century	A pair of lime-washed two-storey cottages with slate roofs, each of one bay with a gable.	II
55–59 High Street; 53.3352°N 2.7996°W		Late 18th century	Three joined lime-washed cottages in one storey with attics.	II
Ice house 53.3319°N 2.8053°W		Mid-19th century	The ice house of the former Hale Hall (now demolished) in brick under an earth mound.	II
Lighthouse; 53.3225°N 2.7941°W		Early 20th century	A disused lighthouse built in brick with a metal roof.	II

== See also ==
- Listed buildings in Ellesmere Port
- Listed buildings in Frodsham
- Listed buildings in Liverpool
- Listed buildings in Runcorn (rural area)
- Listed buildings in Runcorn (urban area)
