= Männer =

Männer may refer to:

- "Männer" (song), song by German singer Herbert Grönemeyer
- Männer (subculture), a Dutch subculture supporting a serene, laid-back and usually liberally-orientated lifestyle
- Männer (magazine), a German magazine for lesbian, gay, bisexual, and transgender people
- Men..., film by German film director Doris Dörrie
