= Barmby Moor =

Village and civil parish in the East Riding of Yorkshire, England

Coordinates: 53°55′50″N 0°49′05″W

- Village and civil parish
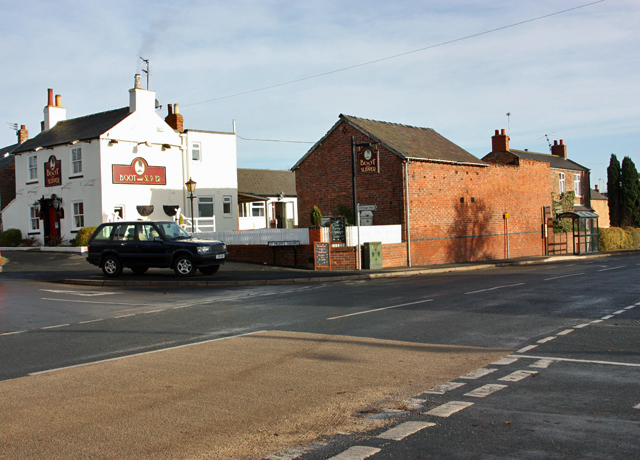
- The Boot and Slipper

- Location within the East Riding of Yorkshire
- Population: 1,114 (2011 census)
- OS grid reference: SE777489
  - London: 170 mi (270 km) S
- Civil parish: Barmby Moor
- Unitary authority: East Riding of Yorkshire
- Ceremonial county: East Riding of Yorkshire
- Region: Yorkshire and the Humber
- Country: England
- Sovereign state: United Kingdom
- Post town: YORK
- Postcode district: YO42
- Dialling code: 01759
- Police: Humberside
- Fire: Humberside
- Ambulance: Yorkshire
- UK Parliament: Bridlington and The Wolds

Barmby Moor is a village and civil parish in the East Riding of Yorkshire, England. It is situated approximately 1.5 miles (2.4 km) west of the market town of Pocklington and 12.5 miles (20 km) east-southeast of the city of York. It lies north of the A1079 road where it is met by the B1246 road that passes through the village.

According to the 2011 UK census, Barmby Moor parish had a population of 1,114, an increase on the 2001 UK census figure of 1,065.

The name Barmby derives from the Old Norse bjarnibȳ or barnebȳ meaning 'Bjarni's' or 'Barne's village'. Perhaps, it could also derive from barnbȳ meaning 'child's village'.

The village was originally a market town with a coaching inn. It has the Anglican St Catherine's Church, Barmby Moor, a chapel, village hall and a primary school. There is also a post office and a pub, The Boot & Slipper. The church and The Manor House were designated as Grade II* listed buildings in 1967 and are now recorded in the National Heritage List for England, maintained by Historic England.

Each July a traditional fete – the Barmby Feast – is held in the village.

== Education ==
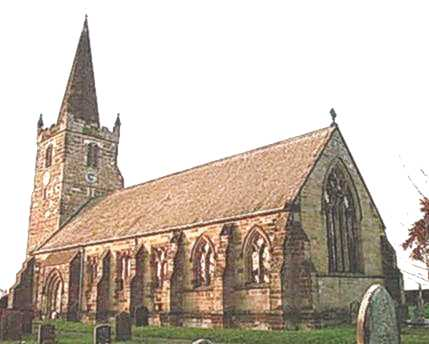
St Catherine's Church

Barmby Moor Primary School is a Church of England school. The foundation governors are appointed by the church. The school maintains close links with St Catherine's Church and other church schools within the Diocese of York.

The former school house is now the location for a Kids Club and a Pre-School. Both are charities run by locals.

== See also ==
- Listed buildings in Barmby Moor
