= Mansfield Woodhouse Urban District =

Former local government area in the UK

Mansfield Woodhouse
- Mansfield Woodhouse Urban District shown within Nottinghamshire in 1970
- Area
  - 1911: 4,834 acres (19.56 km^{2})
  - 1961: 4,831 acres (19.55 km^{2})
- Population
  - 1911: 11,015
  - 1961: 20,197
- History
  - Created: 1894
  - Abolished: 1974
  - Succeeded by: Mansfield District
- Status: Urban District
- Government: Mansfield Woodhouse Urban District Council
  - HQ: Mansfield Woodhouse

Mansfield Woodhouse was an Urban District in Nottinghamshire, England, from 1894 to 1974. It was created under the Local Government Act 1894.

The district was abolished in 1974 under the Local Government Act 1972 and combined with the Municipal Borough of Mansfield and Warsop Urban District to form the new Mansfield district.
