= The Manor House, Barmby Moor =

House in the East Riding of Yorkshire, England

The Manor House
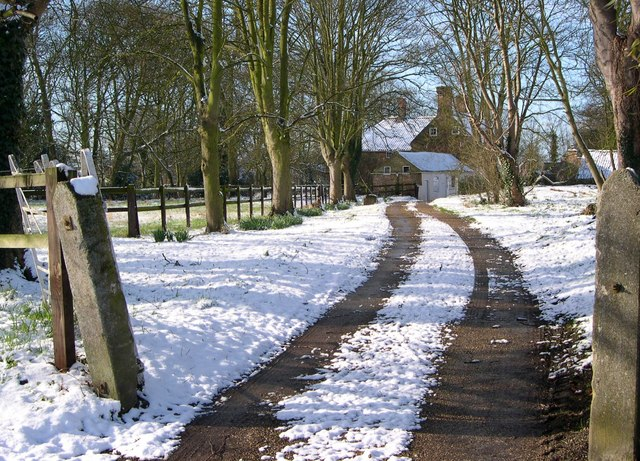
- The house in 2004

- Location within East Riding of Yorkshire

General information
- Location: Hall Spout, Barmby Moor, East Riding of Yorkshire, England
- Coordinates: 53°55′50″N 0°49′01″W
- Year built: 1597
- Renovated: c. 1700 (rebuilt); 18th century (extended)

Listed Building – Grade II*
- Official name: The Manor House
- Designated: 26 January 1967
- Reference no.: 1309940

The Manor House is a historic building on Hall Spout in Barmby Moor, a village in the East Riding of Yorkshire, England.

The site has a long history as a manor house, first being recorded around 1295, and a medieval moat surrounds the current building. It was constructed in 1597, and was largely rebuilt around 1700. In the 18th century, it was extended to the rear. In 1862, Lewis Carroll visited the house, and took photographs including some of Alice Donkin, who has been proposed as a possible inspiration for Alice from Alice's Adventures in Wonderland. The building was Grade II* listed in 1967.

The house is built of stuccoed brick on a plinth, with rusticated quoins, giant rusticated pilasters, a moulded eaves cornice, and a hipped stone slate roof. The main front has two storeys and four bays. The entrance bay is rusticated, and contains a doorway with a moulded surround, panelled reveals and soffit, above which is a moulded cornice. The windows on the ground floor are tripartite sashes with channelled wedge lintels and keystones, and the upper floor contains horizontally sliding sash windows on moulded sills. Inside, there is early panelling, some brought from St Catherine's Church, a carved fireplace dating from around 1640, and an entrance lobby with 19th-century decoration.

== See also ==
- Grade II* listed buildings in the East Riding of Yorkshire
- Listed buildings in Barmby Moor
