= St Mary's Church, Hale =

Coordinates: 53.3325°N 2.7952°W

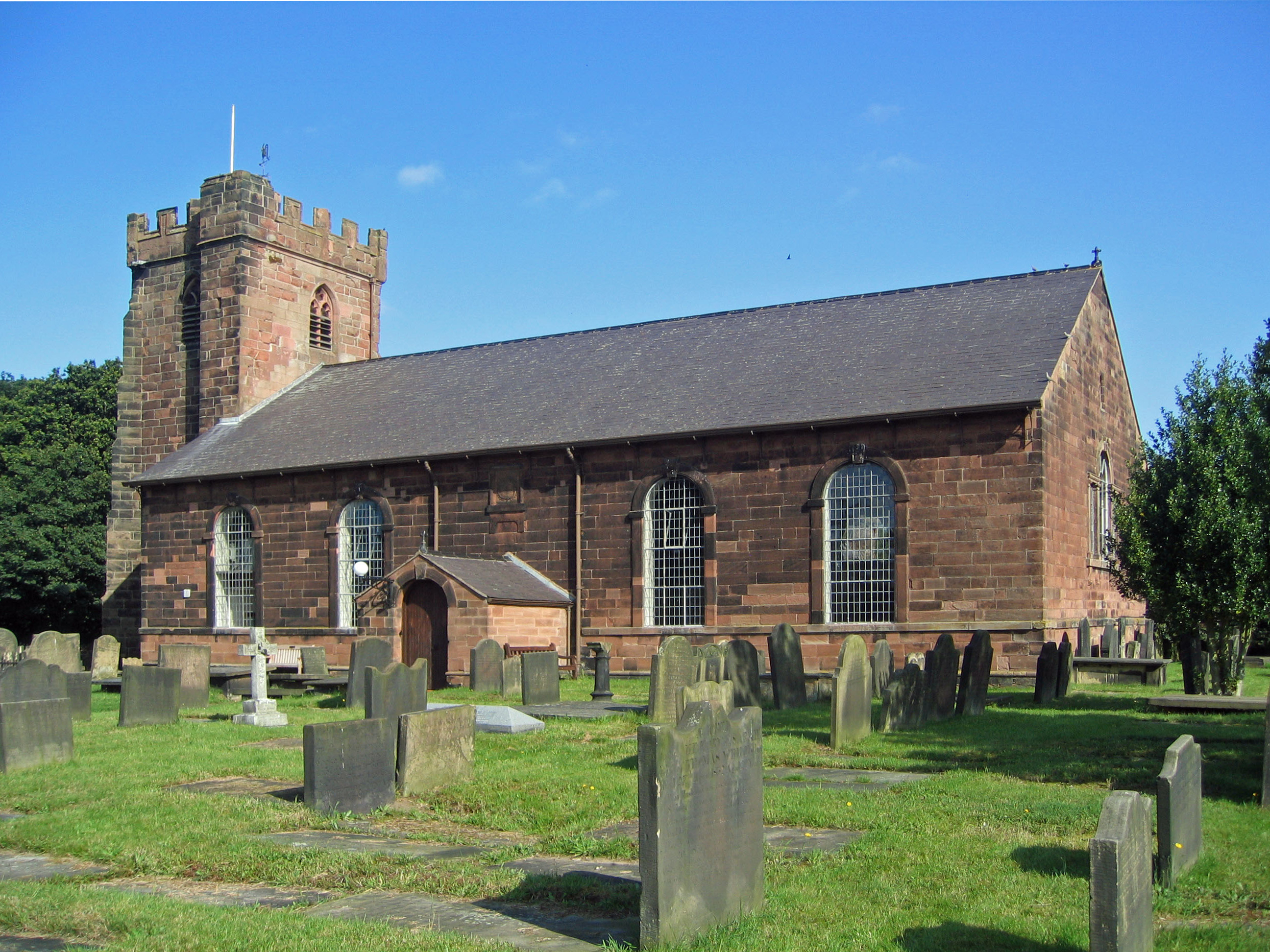
- St Mary's Church, Hale, from the southeast

- Location in Cheshire
- OS grid reference: SJ 471 820
- Location: Church End, Hale, Halton, Cheshire
- Country: England
- Denomination: Anglican
- Website: St Mary, Hale

Architecture
- Heritage designation: Grade II*
- Designated: 28 January 1971
- Architect(s): Buxeby and Evans (1979–80)
- Architectural type: Church
- Style: Gothic, Neoclassical
- Completed: 1980

Specifications
- Materials: Sandstone, slate roof

Administration
- Province: York
- Diocese: Liverpool
- Archdeaconry: Warrington
- Deanery: Widnes
- Parish: Hale St Mary

Clergy
- Vicar: Revd Canon Roland Harvey

St Mary's Church is in Church End in the village of Hale, Halton, Cheshire, England. The church is recorded in the National Heritage List for England as a designated Grade II listed building. It is an active Anglican church in the deanery of Widnes, the archdeaconry of Warrington and the diocese of Liverpool.

== History ==
The tower dates from the 14th century and the rest of the church from 1758 to 1759, replacing an earlier church on the site. Restorations were carried out in 1874, when a northwest vestry was added, and 1903. In October 1977, the church was the victim of an arson attack, leaving only the walls and the tower still standing. As a result of the fire there is nothing remaining of the restorations other than the vestry walls. Following the fire, the foundations of a narrower, timber-framed church were discovered. The roof and interior of the church were replaced by the architects Buxeby and Evans in 1979–80.

== Architecture ==
=== Exterior ===
St Mary's is built in red sandstone ashlar with a slate roof. Its plan is a rectangle in five bays with a west tower, a northwest vestry, a northeast gabled projecting chapel, and a south porch. The tower is square with corner buttresses and a crenellated parapet. It has a west door with a window above it. At the bell stage are two-light louvred belfry windows on all sides. The windows on each side of the body of the church are round-headed. The east window is Venetian in style, glazed in large squares, with a cherub carved in the keystone.

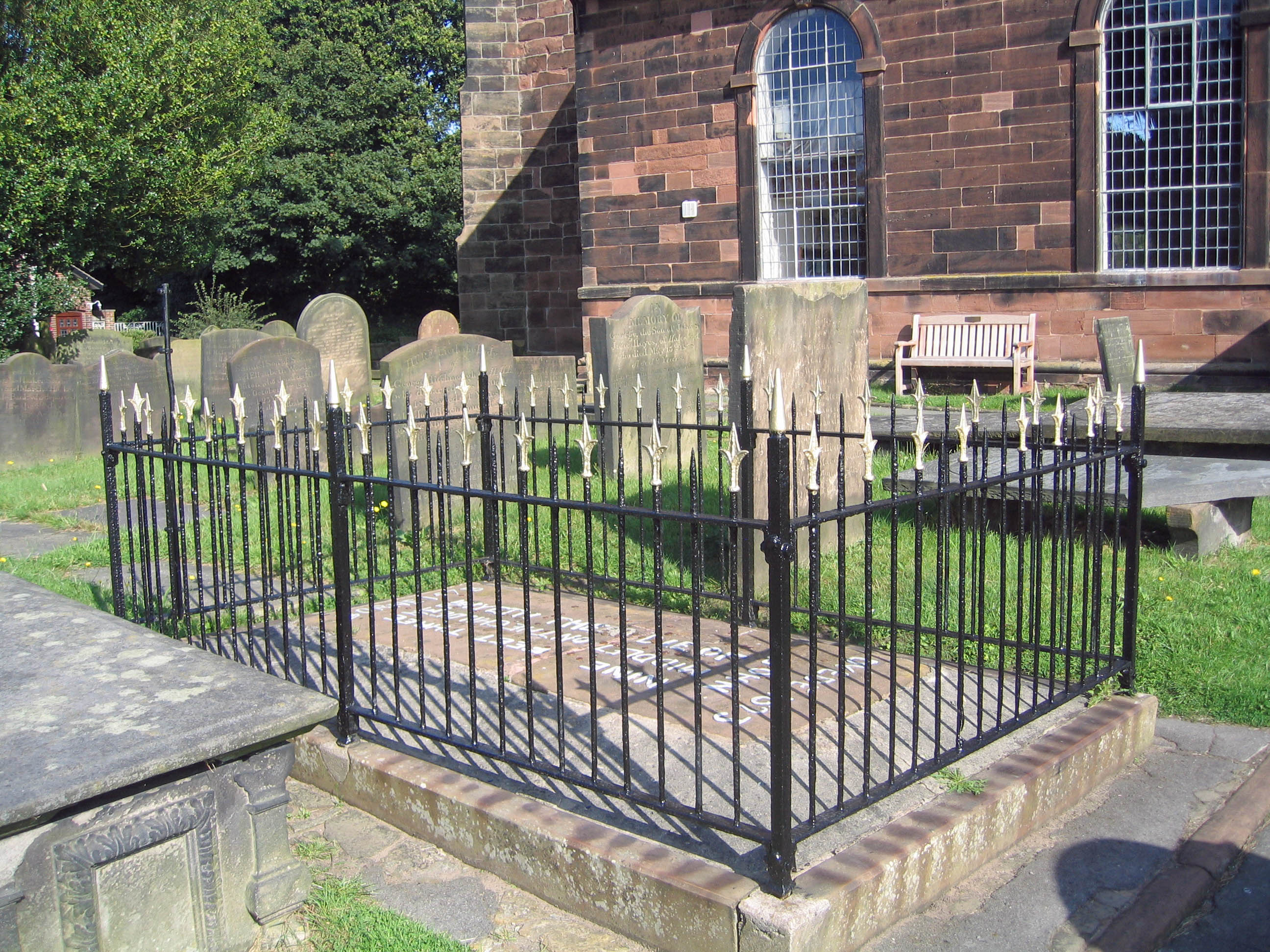
Grave of John Middleton, the "Childe of Hale"

=== Interior ===
The roof, dating from 1979 to 1980, is in varnished chestnut. It is panelled in five compartments, and heavily moulded. The west organ gallery, standing on Tuscan columns, is a replica of that destroyed in the fire. The furniture has been acquired from a variety of sources. The font, which consists of a bowl carved with cherubs, dates from the 18th century and spent a century in a garden. The oak pulpit dating from the 17th century stands on Tuscan columns; it came from York Minster. The pews came from the demolished church of St Mary, Ince-in-Makerfield.

The tower contains a ring of eight bells. The biggest six are cast in steel by Naylor, Vickers and Co. of Sheffield and the smallest two were cast in bronze by Eijsbouts in 1987.

== External features ==
In the churchyard is the grave of John Middleton, known as the "Childe of Hale", who was reputed to have been over 9 feet (3 m) tall. Also in the churchyard are the war graves of four soldiers of World War I and two of World War II.

== See also ==
- Listed buildings in Hale, Halton
