= Warsop Urban District =

Former urban district in Nottinghamshire

Warsop
- Warsop Urban District shown within Nottinghamshire in 1970
- Area
  - 1911: 6,183 acres (25.02 km^{2})
  - 1961: 7,171 acres (29.02 km^{2})
- Population
  - 1911: 4,221
  - 1961: 11,606
- History
  - Created: 1894
  - Abolished: 1974
  - Succeeded by: Mansfield District
- Status: Urban district
- Government: Warsop Urban District Council
  - HQ: Warsop

Warsop was an urban district in Nottinghamshire, England, from 1894 to 1974. It was created under the Local Government Act 1894.

It was enlarged in 1935 when the Sookholme civil parish was transferred to the district.

The district was abolished in 1974 under the Local Government Act 1972 and combined with the Municipal Borough of Mansfield and Mansfield Woodhouse Urban District to form the new Mansfield district.
