= Natasha Manor =

Israeli Russian actress

- נטשה מנור
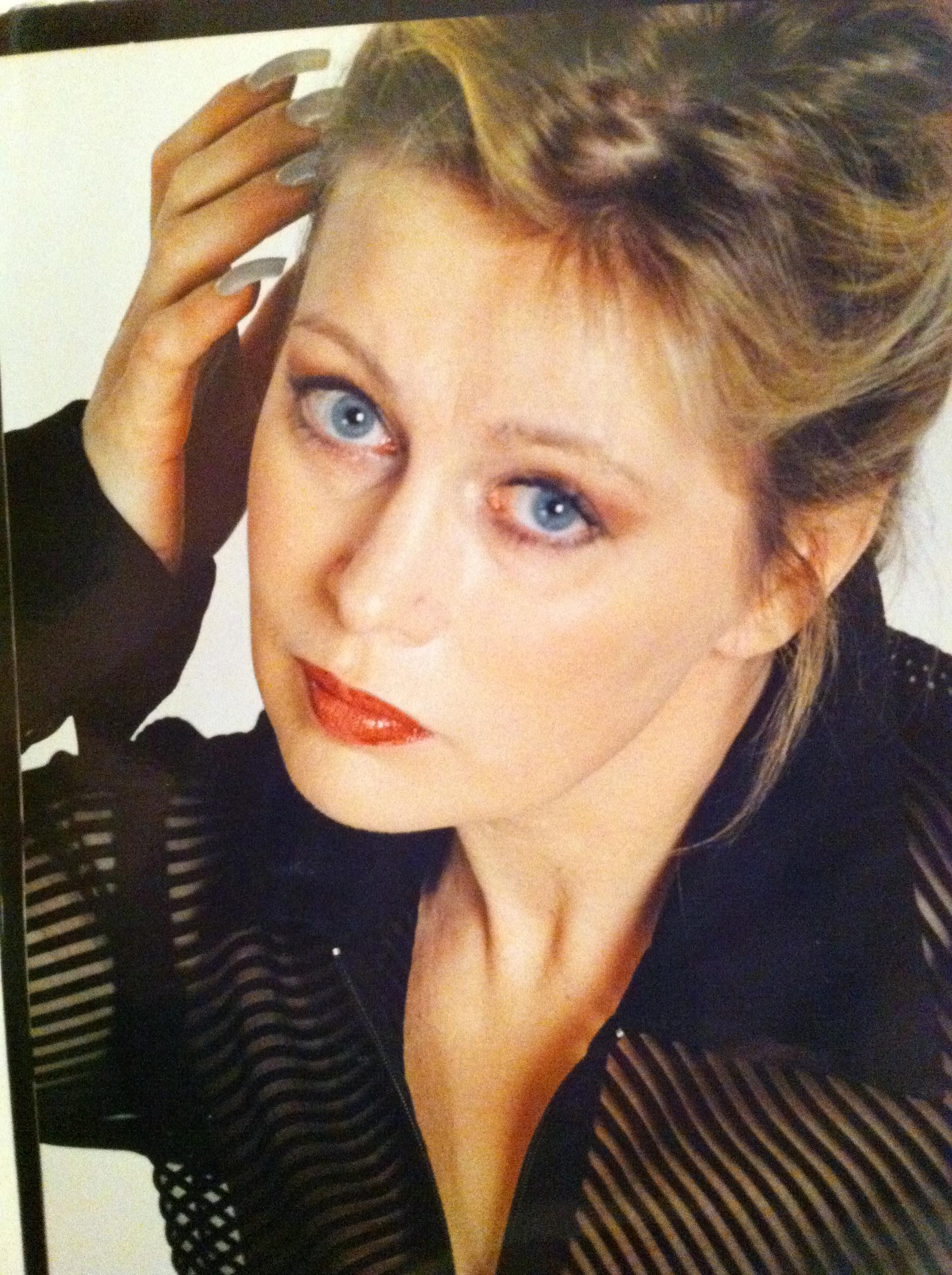
- Born: Наталья Силантьева; August 15, 1958; Ulyanovsk, Soviet Union
- Education: Beit Zvi; Russian Institute of Theatre Arts
- Website: natasha-manor.ucoz.ru

Natasha Manor (Hebrew: נטשה מנור; Russian: Наташа Манор; born August 15, 1958) is an Israeli actress, singer, and TV host. She is one of the founders of the Gesher Theater.

== Early life ==
Natasha Manor was born in Ulyanovsk, Russia, near the Volga. Her father worked in a factory, and her mother was a German language teacher. She completed a master's degree in law and interned at the attorney's office in Ulyanovsk. However, she moved to Moscow to study film criticism.

During her studies, she married Jewish director and actor Igor Vitlovich.

== Career ==
After immigrating to Israel in 1991, Manor joined the group of actors who founded the Gesher Theater. She played in its first play, "Rosencrantz and Guildenstern Are Dead," by Tom Stoppard.

Manor starred in the TV series Condominium (TV series), in which one episode discusses the dolphinarium discotheque massacre, and was awarded at the San Francisco International Film Festival for her acting.

Since 2002, she has hosted the talk show "Seven and Forty" on Channel One Russia, which airs in several countries and has won her a TV award for best actress. In 2007, she won the Actress of the Year award at the Theatronetto & Acco Festival of Alternative Israeli Theatre.

== Music ==
Since 2000, Manor has been performing Russian and gypsy romances and Russian folk songs with a band throughout Israel. She has appeared at various festivals, including the Isha Festival in 2012.
