= David Manners (disambiguation) =

David Manners (1900–1998) was a Canadian film actor in Hollywood, 1929–1936.

David Manners may also refer to:

- David S. Manners (1808–1884), mayor of Jersey City
- David Manners, 11th Duke of Rutland (born 1959), British peer and landowner
