= Charles Manners =

Charles Manners may refer to:

- Charles Manners (bass) (1857–1935), British bass singer and opera company manager
- Lord Charles Manners (British Army officer, died 1761), British general, son of the second Duke of Rutland
- Charles Manners, 4th Duke of Rutland (1754–1787), British politician and nobleman
- Lord Charles Manners (British Army officer, born 1780) (1780–1855), British general, son of the fourth Duke of Rutland
- Charles Manners, 6th Duke of Rutland (1815–1888), British politician and nobleman
- Charles Manners, 10th Duke of Rutland (1919–1999)
- Charles Manners, Marquess of Granby (born 1999)

== See also ==
- Charles Manners-Sutton, archbishop of Canterbury
- Charles Manners-Sutton, 1st Viscount Canterbury, speaker of the House of Commons
- Charles Manners Lushington, MP for Canterbury
