= Robert Manners =

Robert Manners may refer to:

- Lord Robert Manners (British Army officer, died 1782) (c. 1721–1782), British general
- Lord Robert Manners-Sutton (1722–1762), his nephew
- Robert Manners (British Army officer, born 1758) (1758–1823), general and MP for Great Bedwyn and Cambridge
- Lord Robert Manners (Royal Navy officer) (1758–1782), killed at the Battle of the Saintes
- Lord Robert Manners (British Army officer, born 1781) (1781–1835), British major-general and politician

== See also ==
- Duke of Rutland
