= George Manners =

George Manners may refer to:

- George Manners, 11th Baron Ros (1470–1513), English nobleman
- Sir George Manners (died 1623), English MP for Nottingham, 1588–1589, and Derbyshire, 1593–1596
- George Manners, 7th Earl of Rutland (1580–1641), English landowner and politician, great-great-grandson of Baron de Ros
- Lord George Manners-Sutton (1723–1783), born Lord George Manners, British nobleman and politician
- George Manners (Scarborough MP) (c. 1746–1772), English MP for Scarborough, 1768–1772, nephew of the above
- George Manners (editor) (1778–1853), writer and editor, British consul in Boston, Massachusetts, 1819–1839
- George Phillips Manners (1789–1866), British architect
- Lord George Manners (1820–1874), British nobleman and politician
- George Manners (weightlifter) (born 1938), English weightlifter

== See also ==
- George Manners-Sutton (1751–1804), British politician, son of Lord George Manners-Sutton
