= Roger Manners (disambiguation) =

Roger Manners, 5th Earl of Rutland (1576–1612)

Roger Manners may also refer to:

- Roger Manners (died 1607) (1536–1607), MP
- Roger Manners (died 1632) (1575–1632), MP
- Roger Manners, a character in the 1950 film State Penitentiary
