= John Middleton (giant) =

English giant (1578–1623)

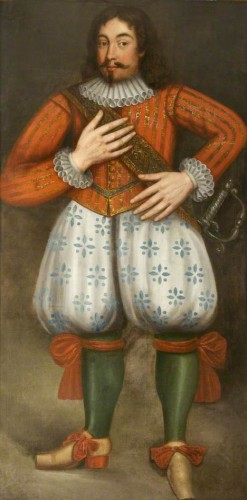
- Born: 1578; Hale, Liverpool, England
- Died: 1623 (Aged c. 45); Hale, Liverpool, England
- Known for: Giant
- Height: 7 ft 9 in (2.36 m) to 9 ft 3 in (2.82 m) (unverified)

John Middleton (1578–1623) was an English giant who was born in the village of Hale and is commonly known as the Childe of Hale. He was allegedly 9 feet 3 inches (2.82 m) tall, and legend tells that he slept with his feet out of the window of his small house, and tales credit him with great strength. He was employed as a bodyguard by the sheriff of Lancashire.

== History ==
Middleton was born in the village of Hale, near Liverpool. According to contemporary accounts and his epitaph, he grew to the height of 9 feet 3 inches (2.82 m) and slept with his feet hanging out the window of his house.

Because of his size the landlord and sheriff of Lancashire, Gilbert Ireland, hired him as a bodyguard. When King James I stopped by in 1617 to knight Ireland he heard about Middleton and invited both of them to the court, which they accepted in 1620. Middleton beat the King's champion in wrestling and in doing so broke the man's thumb. He received £20, approximately £3,500 adjusted for inflation (2024). Jealous of his wealth, Middleton's companions either mugged or swindled him out of his money while he was returning to Hale. Middleton died impoverished in 1623. Whilst his death is sometimes claimed to have occurred in 1628, church records indicate 1623. He was buried in the cemetery of St Mary's Church in Hale. The epitaph reads, "Here lyeth the bodie of John Middleton the Childe of Hale. Nine feet three. Borne 1578 Dyede 1623." He is likely one of the tallest people in history. If these height markings are accurate, he would surpass Robert Wadlow's stature of 8 ft 11 in (2.72 m).

== Influence ==
There have been numerous local uses and commemorations of Middleton; a pub in Hale, named The Childe of Hale, bears a copy of the Brasenose College portrait as its sign. In 1996 a large tree trunk opposite the church was carved with representations of John Middleton, Hale Lighthouse and other local symbols. In 2011, because of disease and in the interests of public safety the tree trunk was removed by Halton Borough Council. In April 2013, the wooden sculpture was replaced by a bronze statue three-metre (9.8 ft) tall by sculptor Diane Gorvin.

== Portraits ==
Brasenose College, Oxford, possesses a life-sized portrait, two smaller paintings and two life-sized representations of his hands. Another life-sized portrait can be seen at Speke Hall in Liverpool, a National Trust property. A supposed 18th-century exhumation calculated Middleton's height as 9 ft 3 in (2.82 m); Guinness World Records estimated a height of 7 ft 9 in (2.36 m) from the Brasenose College handprints.

== Childe of Hale Trail ==
Speke Hall, near Hale, incorporates a woodland trail depicting his house, feet, hands and other items.

== Gallery ==
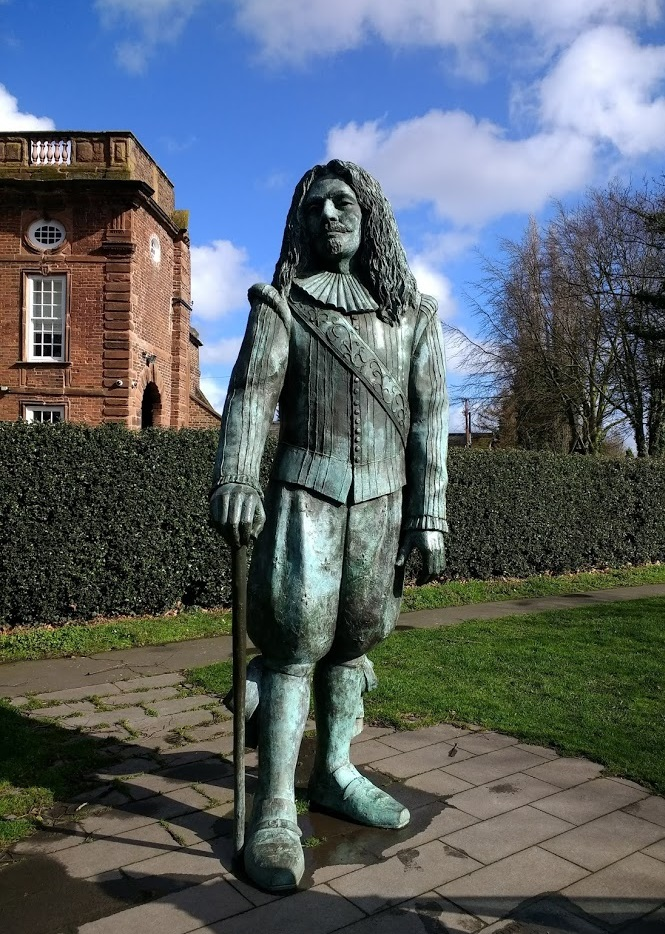
Bronze sculpture of the Childe of Hale

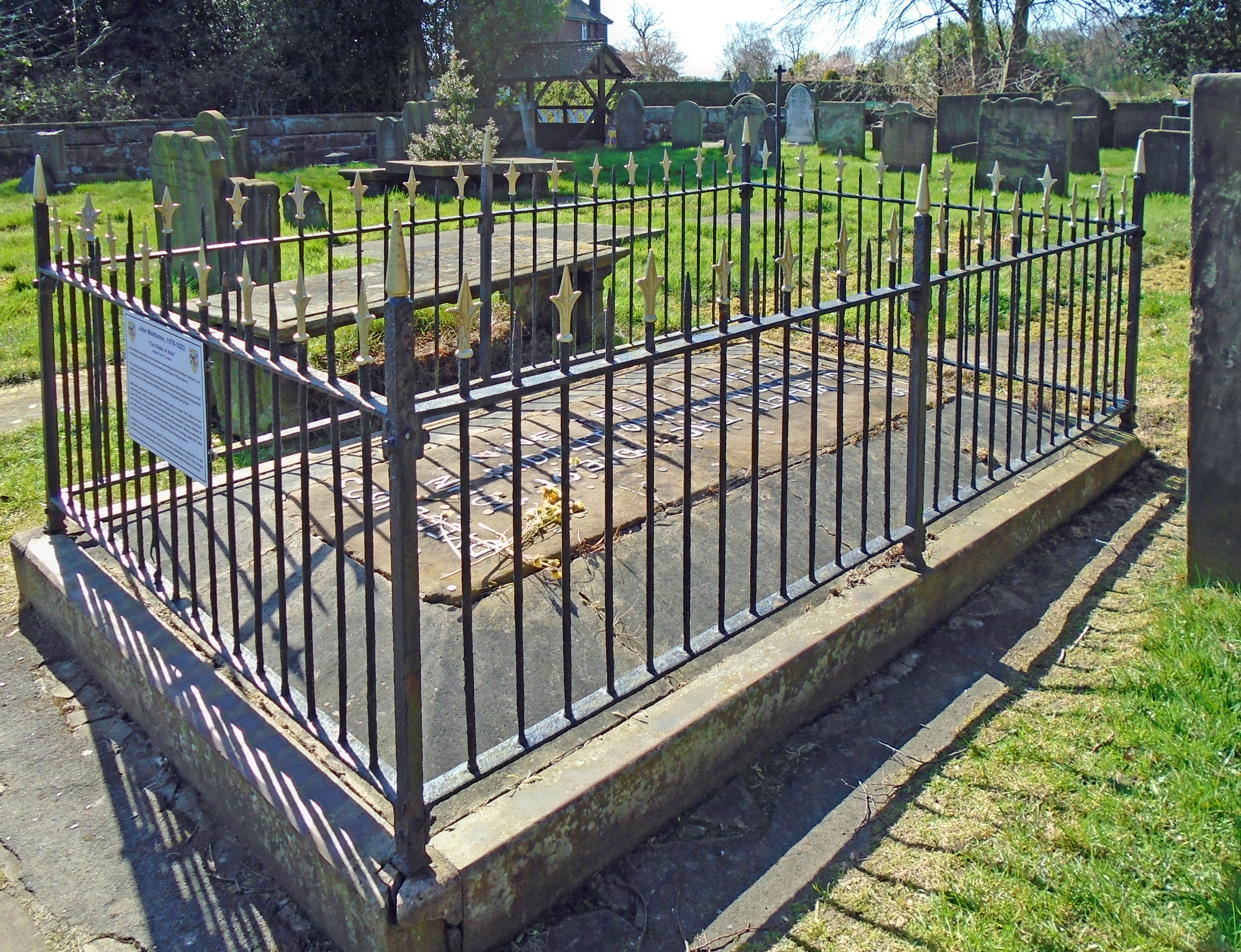
Grave at St Mary's Church

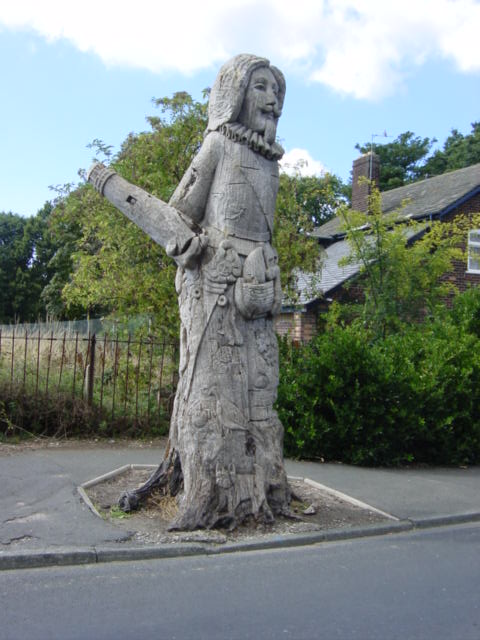
A wooden sculpture formerly opposite the church but now removed

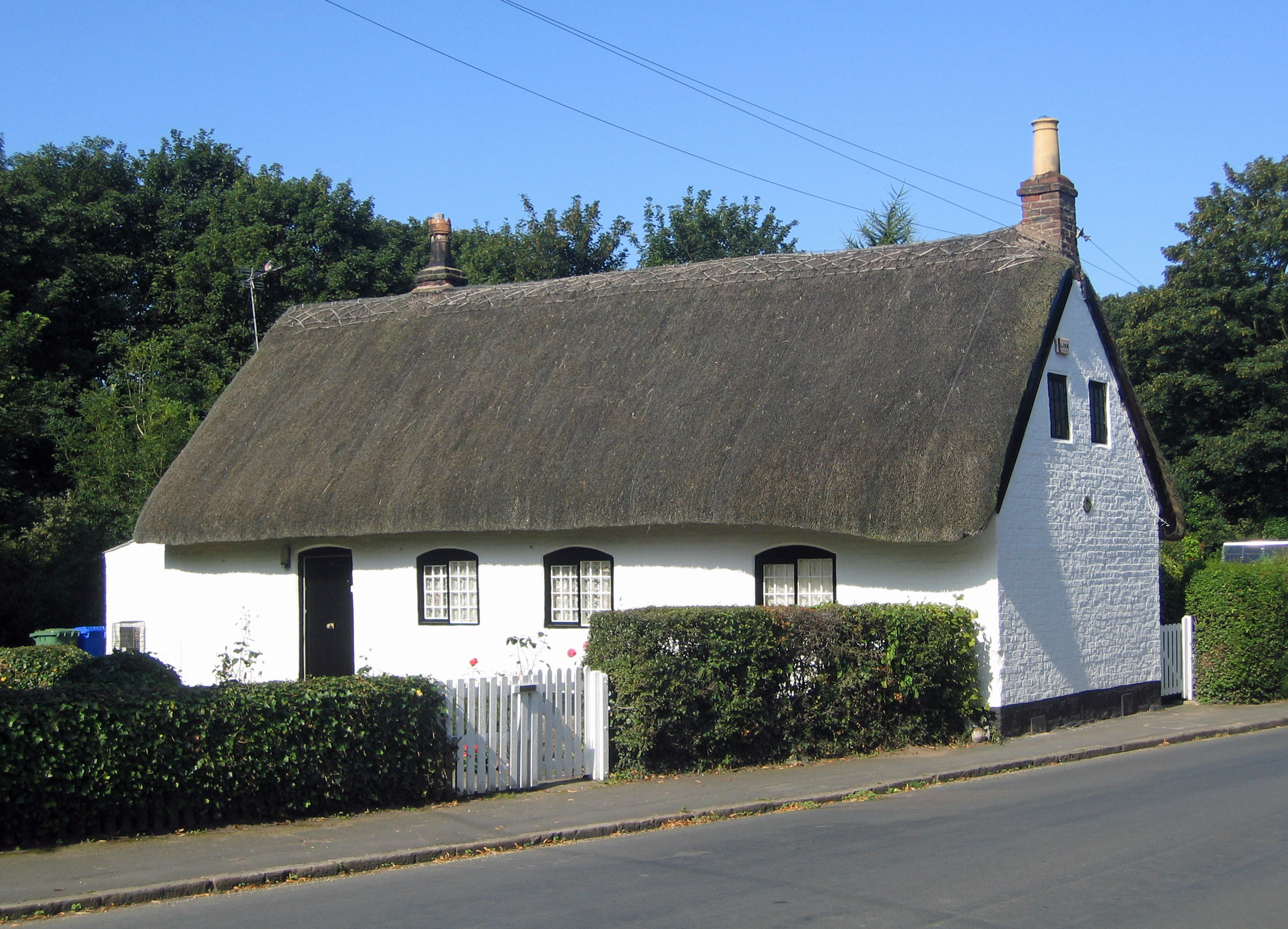
14 Church End, Hale, Middleton's supposed birthplace

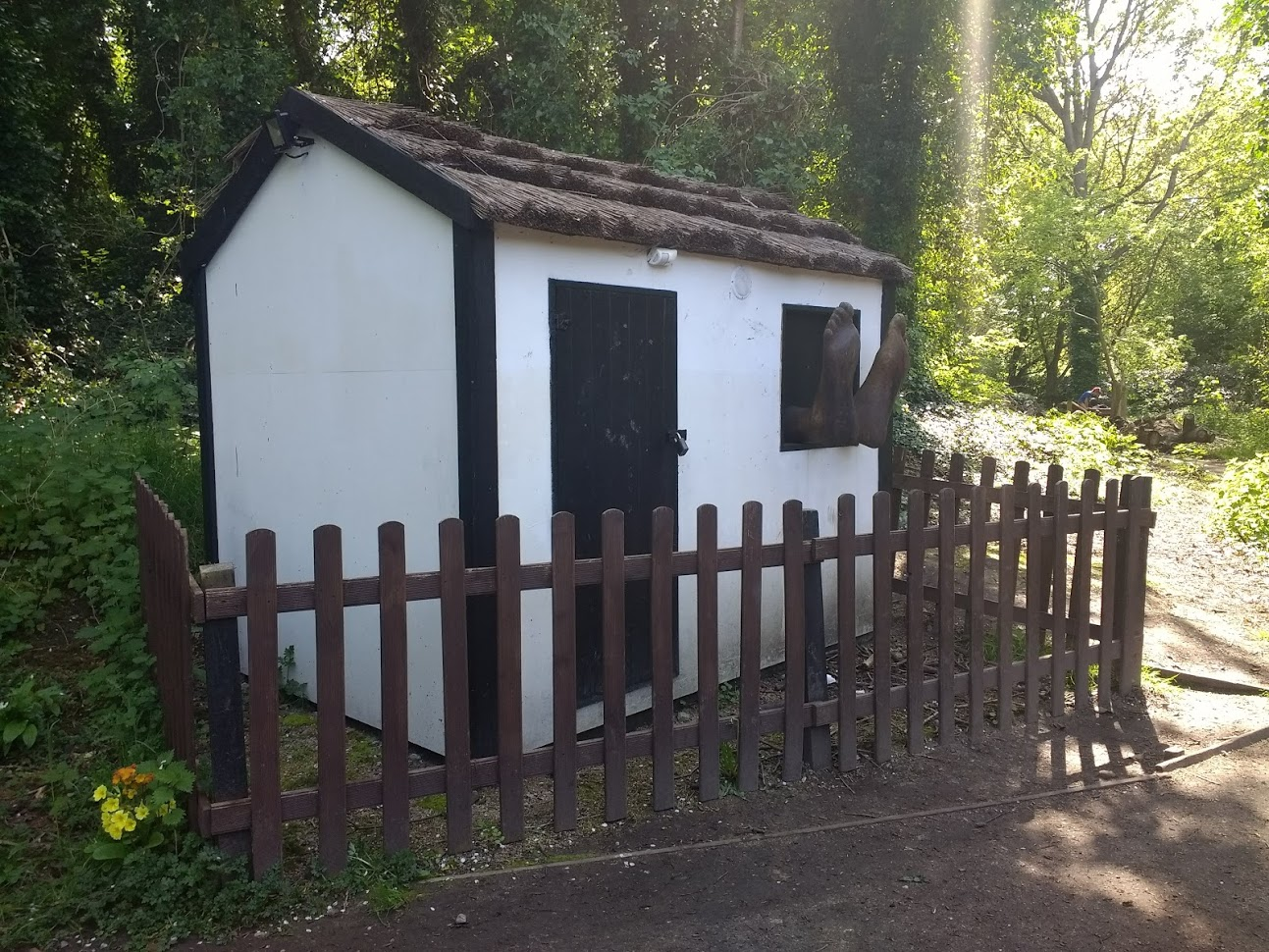
Depiction of Middleton's house at Speke Hall. His feet are hanging through the window and when approached snoring is heard.
