= Manor House (Naples, Maine) =

Historic house in Maine, United States

- U.S. National Register of Historic Places
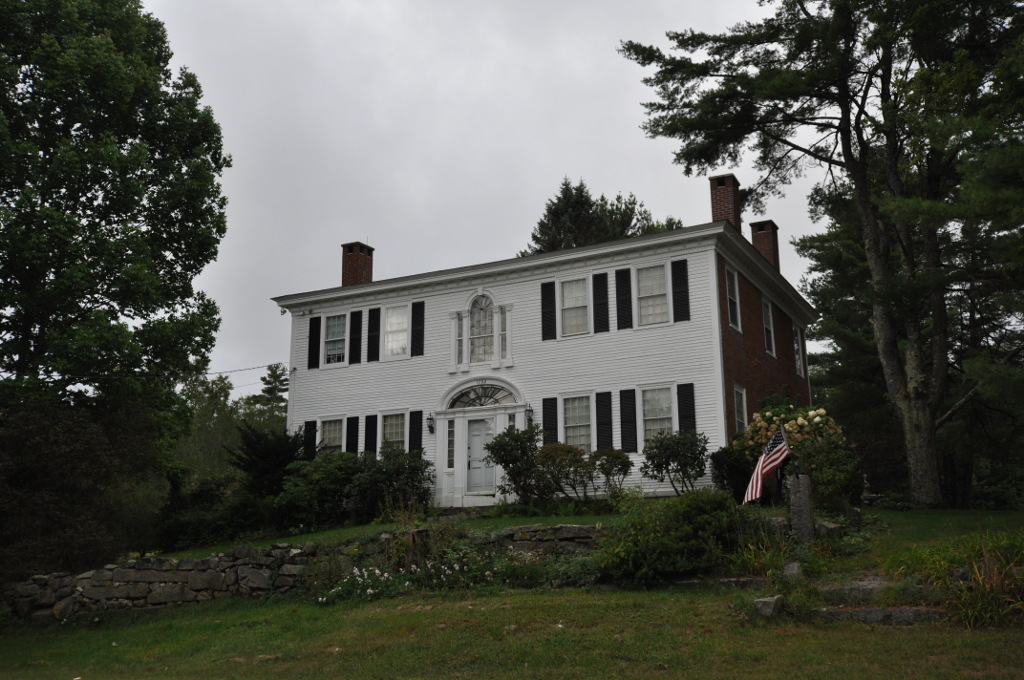

- Location within Maine Location within the United States
- Location: U.S. 302, Naples, Maine
- Coordinates: 43°58′42″N 70°37′31″W
- Area: 1 acre (0.40 ha)
- Built: 1797
- Built by: George Peirce
- Architectural style: Federal
- NRHP reference No.: 78000173
- Added to NRHP: July 12, 1978

The Manor House is a historic house on United States Route 302 in Naples, Maine. Built in 1796 by one of the area's first settlers, it is a rare high-quality example of Federal period architecture in the rural interior of the state. It was listed on the National Register of Historic Places in 1978.

== Description and history ==
The Manor House is located on the south side of United States Route 302, several miles north of the town center of Naples, at a location that would have historically had a view of Long Lake to the north. The house is a 2 1/2-story wood-frame structure, five bays wide, with a low-pitch hip roof, brick side walls, clapboarded front and back walls, and a stone foundation. The main entrance is centrally located, with flanking pilasters and sidelight windows, and a semi-oval transom window above. A Palladian window with a half-round central window and narrow side windows is set on the second floor above the entrance, also articulated by pilasters. A single-story wood-frame ell extends to the rear.

The house was built in 1796 by George Peirce, one of Naples' first settlers. Peirce arrived in the area (then part of Otisfield) in 1775 as the land agent for an absentee proprietor, and established the area's first gristmill and sawmill. He was Naples' first town clerk, and served as its constable in 1798. The house he built is of unusually high quality for the period in interior Maine (29 miles (47 km) from the coast).

== See also ==
- National Register of Historic Places listings in Cumberland County, Maine
