= Manor House, Hale =

Historic building in Cheshire, England

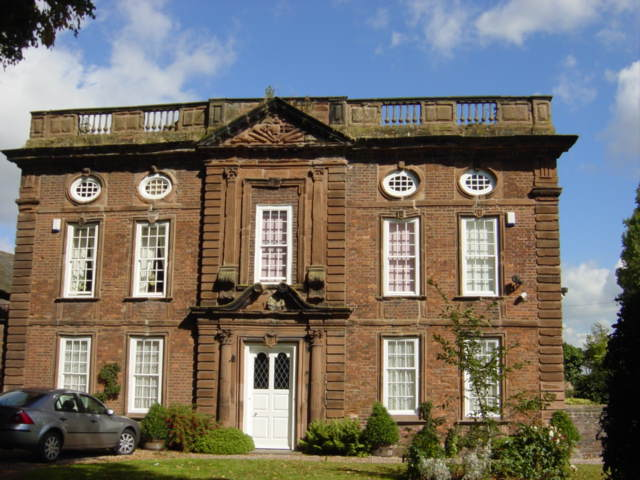
- Manor House, Hale

- Location in Cheshire
- 53.3336°N 2.7964°W
- Location: Church End, Hale, Cheshire, England
- OS grid reference: SJ 470 821

History
- Built: Mid 17th century
- Rebuilt: Early 18th century

Listed Building – Grade II*
- Official name: The Manor House
- Designated: 28 May 1958
- Reference no.: 1330339

The Manor House, Hale is a house in Church End, Hale, a village in the borough of Halton, Cheshire, England. It is recorded in the National Heritage List for England as a designated Grade II* listed building.

== History ==
The house was first built, not as a manor house, but as a vicarage. It was originally built in the middle of the 17th century. In the early 18th century, when the incumbent was Rev William Langford, it was refaced and partly rebuilt. During the 19th century the building was used as a farmhouse and was known as Manor Farm. The last lord of the manor of Hale was Peter Fleetwood-Hesketh, who was also an architectural historian. In 1947 he moved into the house with his family.

== Architecture ==
The manor house is built in brown brick with red sandstone dressings. The façade is symmetrical with two-and-a-half storeys and five bays. Both lateral bays and the central bay are flanked by rusticated Doric pilasters. The central bay contains a door with Corinthian columns on each side. Above the door is a scrolled pediment containing the arms of Rev Langford. The upper storey of the central bay contains a sash window on each side of which are Corinthian pilasters on large brackets. Above the window is another pediment containing carving. The other bays each contain a sash window in both storeys while the top half-storey contains four blind oval windows; all these windows are in moulded stone frames. Across the top of the façade is a cornice and a balustraded parapet. Behind the façade the house is two-gabled, the north gable being higher than the south.

Internally the entrance hall is panelled with fluted pilasters. There are two staircases, the main one having twisted balusters and the secondary one having flat balusters.

== Culture ==
John Betjeman wrote a poem about the house entitled The Manor House, Hale, Near Liverpool.

== See also ==
- Grade I and II* listed buildings in Halton (borough)
- Listed buildings in Hale, Halton
