= Männer (subculture) =

The Männer subculture is a subculture which can be found in the southern parts of the Netherlands and which has been influenced by Dutch, Limburgish, German, and Belgian culture.

== History and etymology ==
=== Meaning ===
The Männer subculture finds its origins in the Southern Netherlands, and is generally used to describe a person or group of people whose views support a serene, laid-back and usually liberally-orientated lifestyle. The word derives from the plural form of the German word "Mann", which translated to English means 'man'. The term gained popularity in the early 2000s and since has become a part of the basic vocabulary of teenagers in most parts of the Southern Netherlands, especially in the province of Limburg. Commonly used synonyms for Männer, when used to refer to a person, include, but are not limited to: "Chiller", "Pik", "Chef", "Jong", ”Joete”, "Chimi" and "Wiekser".

=== Characteristics and lifestyle ===
Even though the literal translation would suggest that Männer refers to a solely male-subculture, people from all genders can become part of and participate in the common activities that are associated with the Männer subculture. This is due to the fact that the liberal point of view usually associated with Männer subculture implies the individual freedom for one to choose and act like the gender he or she prefers, thus making it paradoxical to hypothetically exclude people based on their gender type. Furthermore, the word Männer can be used to describe both a single person who is part of the subculture, making it a singularis pro plurali style figure, and a group of people that are part of the subculture.

The Männer lifestyle commonly implies a calm, happy and down to earth approach to life, which for example affiliates attendance to alternative music-festivals as well as listening to alternative music, free artistic expression, responsible usage of drugs, watching so called 'Stoner Movies' and adult cartoons, chilling, and the general urge to avoid being in stressful situations. The Männer is especially intrigued by the main philosophical and ontological questions of mankind, and usually tries to find an enhanced answer to said questions when under the influence of marijuana.

=== Common phrases ===
Common phrases used by Männer include, but are not limited to: "Enne" (a greeting), "Auwhoer" or "Auwmuk" (to describe a feeling of excitement or shock), "Wat ga je biggie doen?" (to ask another Männer why he/or she is acting overly masculin), "Auwhoer pik auwhoer" (to describe an extreme feeling of excitement or shock), "Hee Chef" (a greeting), "Jow" (to confirm a question), "Iba! Iba!" (to announce that police officers are approaching), "Jonko" or "Pient(je)" or "sjarrelleke" (to describe a joint)(In the case "sjarrelleke","sjarel" is used when referring to a fat joint), "Tup", "Wiri" or "Assie" (to describe some form of marijuana), "Über" (to describe another Männer), "Djoenta" (to describe someone's profession), and "Kom ballie" (to ask (virtually) present Männer to play a game of football.
