= Hale, Halton =

Village in Cheshire, England

Coordinates: 53.33673°N 2.80007°W

Hale
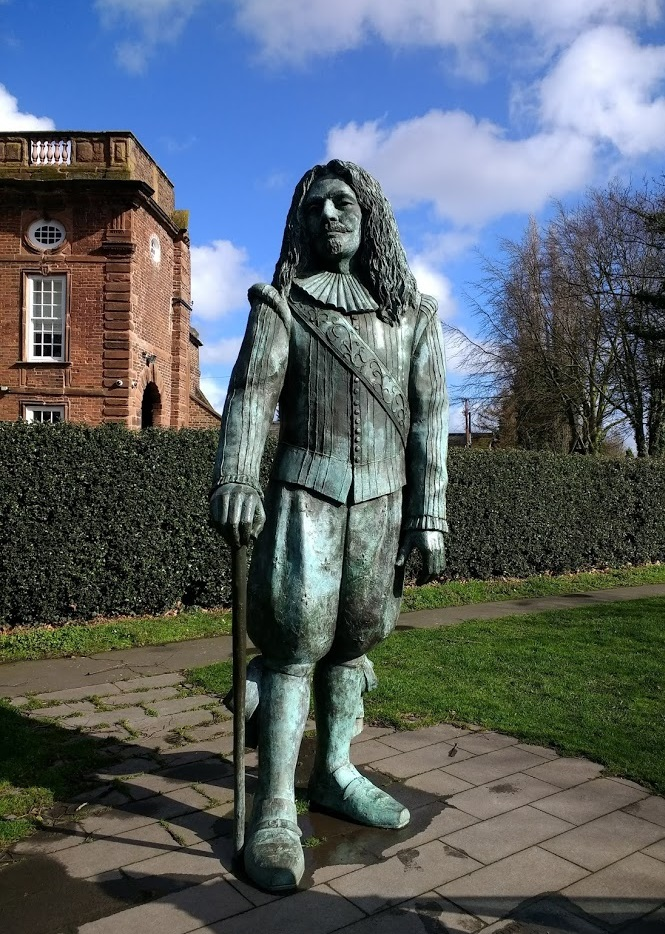
- Statue of John Middleton

- Location within Cheshire
- Population: 1,800 (2021)
- OS grid reference: SJ468824
- Civil parish: Hale
- Unitary authority: Halton
- Ceremonial county: Cheshire
- Region: North West
- Country: England
- Sovereign state: United Kingdom
- Post town: LIVERPOOL
- Postcode district: L24
- Dialling code: 0151
- Police: Cheshire
- Fire: Cheshire
- Ambulance: North West
- UK Parliament: Widnes and Halewood
- Hale Head Lighthouse
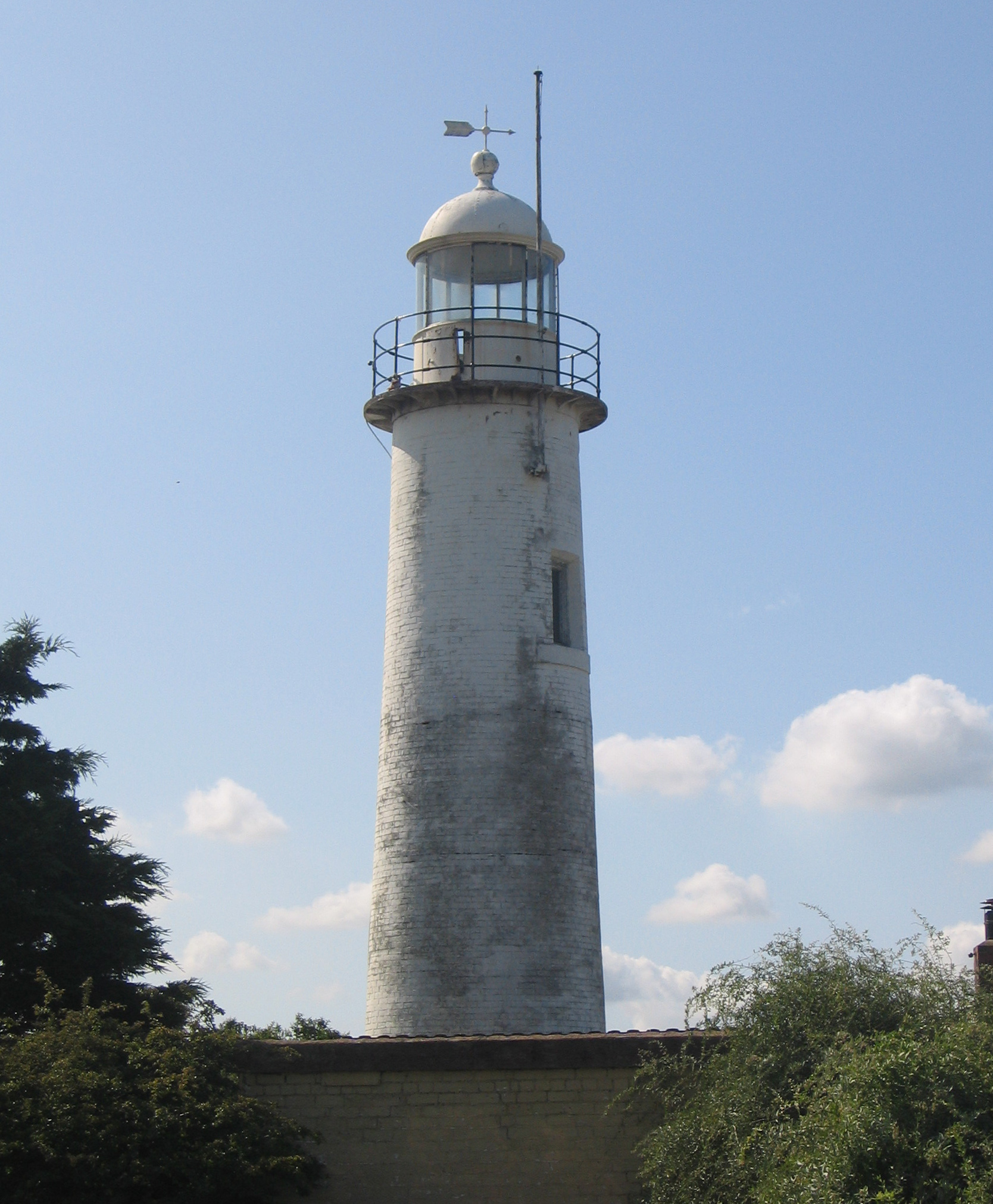
- Hale Head Lighthouse in 2009
- Constructed: 1906
- Built by: John Arthur Saner
- Construction: brick
- Height: 17.5 m (57 ft)
- Shape: cylindrical tower with balcony and lantern attached to 1-storey keeper's house
- Markings: White (tower), white (lantern)
- Operator: private
- Heritage: Grade II listed building
- Deactivated: 1958
- Focal height: 21.3 m (70 ft)
- Original light
- Constructed: 1838
- Shape: octagon

Hale is a village and civil parish in the Borough of Halton, Cheshire, England with a population of 1,800. The village is north of the River Mersey, and just to the east of the boundary with Merseyside. It is 3 miles east of Speke in Liverpool, and 4 miles south-west of Widnes. The nearby village of Halebank is to the north-east.

Within the boundaries of the historic county of Lancashire, until 1 April 1974 the area formed part of the Whiston Rural District.

== Demography ==
The population of the parish is stable with a population of 1,898 (2001 census), 1,841 (2011 census) and 1,800 (2021 census).

== Economy ==
In 2020, the GVA for the Hale Built-up Area was £11.9 million.

== Notable people ==
- John Middleton (1578–1623), the Childe of Hale, was reputed to be nine feet, three inches tall, or 2.8 m. His cottage and grave are located in the village. Just outside St Mary's Church was a wooden carving of the Childe Of Hale that is said to have been life-sized. It was replaced in 2013 by a 3-metre bronze statue by sculptor Diane Gorvin.
- Audrey Withers (1905–2001), editor of Vogue between 1940 and 1960, was born in Hale, where her father was a local doctor.
- Charles Peter Fleetwood-Hesketh (1905–1985), (usually known as Peter Fleetwood-Hesketh), was the last "lord of the manor" of Hale, and resided at The Manor House, Hale from 1947 to 1985. An architect and architectural historian, he served in the Second World War, partly in co-ordination with the Maquis (guerrilla fighters) in occupied France.
- Jermaine Pennant (born 1983), former Liverpool footballer lived in Hale.

== Hale Head Lighthouse ==
Hale Head is the southernmost point in the historic county of Lancashire. A lighthouse was established here in 1838; the original octagonal structure was superseded by a taller cylindrical tower in 1906. The rebuilding was overseen by John Arthur Saner, civil engineer. The light was discontinued in 1958 because of a decline in shipping, and sold a few years later for £1,100; the building remains in use as a private residence. The former optic is now in Merseyside Maritime Museum.

== See also ==
- List of listed buildings in Hale, Halton
- Hale Duck Decoy
