= Municipal Borough of Mansfield =

Former local government area in the UK

Mansfield
- Municipal Borough of Mansfield shown within Nottinghamshire in 1970.
- Area
  - 1911: 7,068 acres (28.60 km^{2})
  - 1961: 7,009 acres (28.36 km^{2})
- Population
  - 1911: 36,888
  - 1961: 53,218
- History
  - Created: 1891
  - Abolished: 1974
  - Succeeded by: Mansfield District
- Status: Municipal borough
- Government: Mansfield Borough Council
  - HQ: Mansfield

Mansfield was a municipal borough in Nottinghamshire, England from 1891 to 1974. It was created under the Municipal Corporations Act 1835.

The borough was abolished in 1974 under the Local Government Act 1972 and combined with Mansfield Woodhouse Urban District and Warsop Urban District to form the new Mansfield district.

== Freedom of the Borough ==
The following people and military units have received the Freedom of the Borough of Mansfield.

=== Individuals ===
- John Harrop White: 1924.
