= The Manor Academy =

Secondary school in Mansfield Woodhouse

Location
- Park Hall Road; Mansfield Woodhouse, Nottinghamshire, NG19 8QA; England
- Coordinates: 53.171459°N 1.188668°W

Information
- Type: Academy
- Motto: Aspire, Achieve, Excel
- Established: 1973
- Trust: The Two Counties Trust
- Department for Education URN: 137158 Tables
- Ofsted: Reports
- Chair of Governors: Judith Caswell
- Head Teacher: Rob Gladwin
- Staff: 135 members of staff
- Gender: Co-educational
- Age: 11 to 18
- Enrolment: 988
- Website: https://manor.ttct.co.uk/

The Manor Academy is a co-educational secondary school with academy status in Mansfield Woodhouse, Nottinghamshire, overseen by and part of The Two Counties Trust.

== Admissions ==
In 2017 61% of students at the Manor Academy gained a grade 4 or higher in English and mathematics studies. In addition to this, 92% of A-Level students also passed their subjects in 2017.

The school has its own sports and recreation centre, a full sized all-weather sports pitch, a construction centre, an engineering workshop, a hair and beauty training salon, advanced ICT facilities, a comprehensive library, and the Manor Farm, which consists primarily of chickens, but is also used to grow different varieties of crops.

An investment in iPads for the whole school in 2014 also improved teaching by providing advanced tools to improve learning.

== History ==
=== Grammar school ===
Manor Technical Grammar School was opened on Tuesday 8 September 1959, the same day as The Garibaldi School.

There were 400 at the school at the start; this was to reach 700. The coat of arms were from the Digby family who lived at the Manor house in the town. The headmaster was Mr G Hovington from Ramsey Grammar School on the Isle of Man.

=== Comprehensive ===
The school was previously made up of the Forest View County Secondary Modern school on Park Hall Road, and a site on Yorke Street.

On Saturday 16 March 1996 a £1.5m fire was started by 15 year old Thomas Anderson of Withington in Manchester, who had started at the school only in February 1996. He received three years in August 1996. There were around fifty firefighters, and a large two storey block destroyed, with three geography classrooms, the headmaster's and deputy head's offices, and the staff room.

Following the destruction of large parts of the Park Hall Road site by fire in 1996, work was carried out to incorporate the school to a single site. This was achieved for the start of the 1999/2000 school year, and the Yorke Street site was demolished and sold for housing construction.

=== Academy status ===
The Manor School was selected by application to the office of the Secretary of State to become an Academy in 2011.

In January 2017, following "a damning Ofsted report", 11 teachers had left, eight had been engaged but six were on maternity leave, including the head.

As of 1 September 2017, the Manor Academy became part of The Two Counties Trust. The CEO of the Two Counties Trust (Richard Vasey) also became the Executive Head Teacher until September 2018 when Katrina Kerry became Head Teacher.

In April 2026, Katrina Kerry stepped down as Head Teacher after more than 20 years at the academy, having joined in 2004. As of 2026, the current Head Teacher is Rob Gladwin.

=== Previous heads ===
- Jonathon Hickman, 15 years in the role
- Donna Trusler, appointed to succeed Hickman from September 2014 until 2017, was the former deputy-head

== Controversy ==
In late April 2016, three teachers were suspended following an April Fool's Day prank where Olbas Oil was introduced into a drink of tea, which caused a trainee teacher to be hospitalised for monitoring. The incident was reported to the local newspaper following school-gossip.

In early May, the school announced that the three suspended teachers had left "by mutual agreement", and, following the Ofsted report, "the school’s 900-plus students must come first".

Following the COVID-19 outbreak, The Two Counties Trust decided that the Manor Sport and Recreation Centre should not be opened to the public. They described it as 'unfeasible to reopen the outdoor facilities to the community'.
