= Manner (surname) =

Manner is a surname. Notable people with the surname include:

- Eeva-Liisa Manner (1921–1995), Finnish poet, playwright and translator
- Jan Männer (1982–2022), German footballer
- Kullervo Manner (1880–1939), Finnish Communist leader
- Riikka Manner (born 1981), Finnish politician
