= Thomas Manners =

Thomas Manners may refer to:

- Thomas Manners (MP for Nottinghamshire) (1537–1591), MP for Nottingham and Nottinghamshire
- Thomas Manners, 1st Earl of Rutland (born before 1488–1543)
- Thomas Manners-Sutton, 1st Baron Manners (1756–1842), British lawyer and politician, Lord Chancellor of Ireland
