= St Catherine's Church, Barmby Moor =

Church in Barmby Moor, East Riding of Yorkshire, England

Coordinates: 53.9308°N 0.8189°W

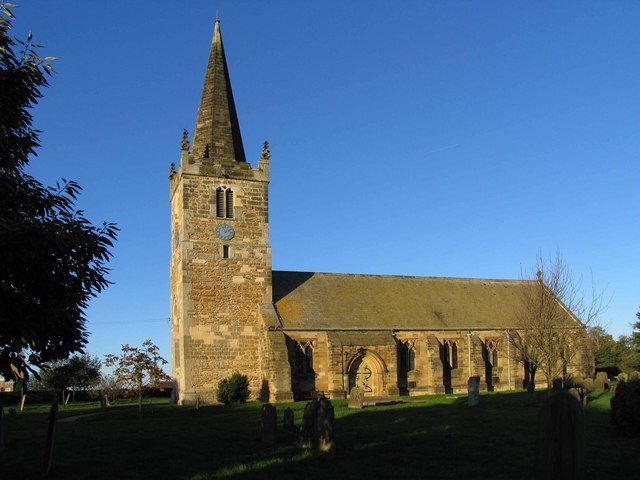
The church, in 2006

St Catherine's Church is the parish church of Barmby Moor, a village in the East Riding of Yorkshire, in England.

A church existed in Barmby Moor by the 11th century. The oldest part of the current building is the tower, which was constructed in the 15th century. The remainder of the church was rebuilt in 1851, to a design by J. B. Atkinson. The building was grade II* listed in 1967.

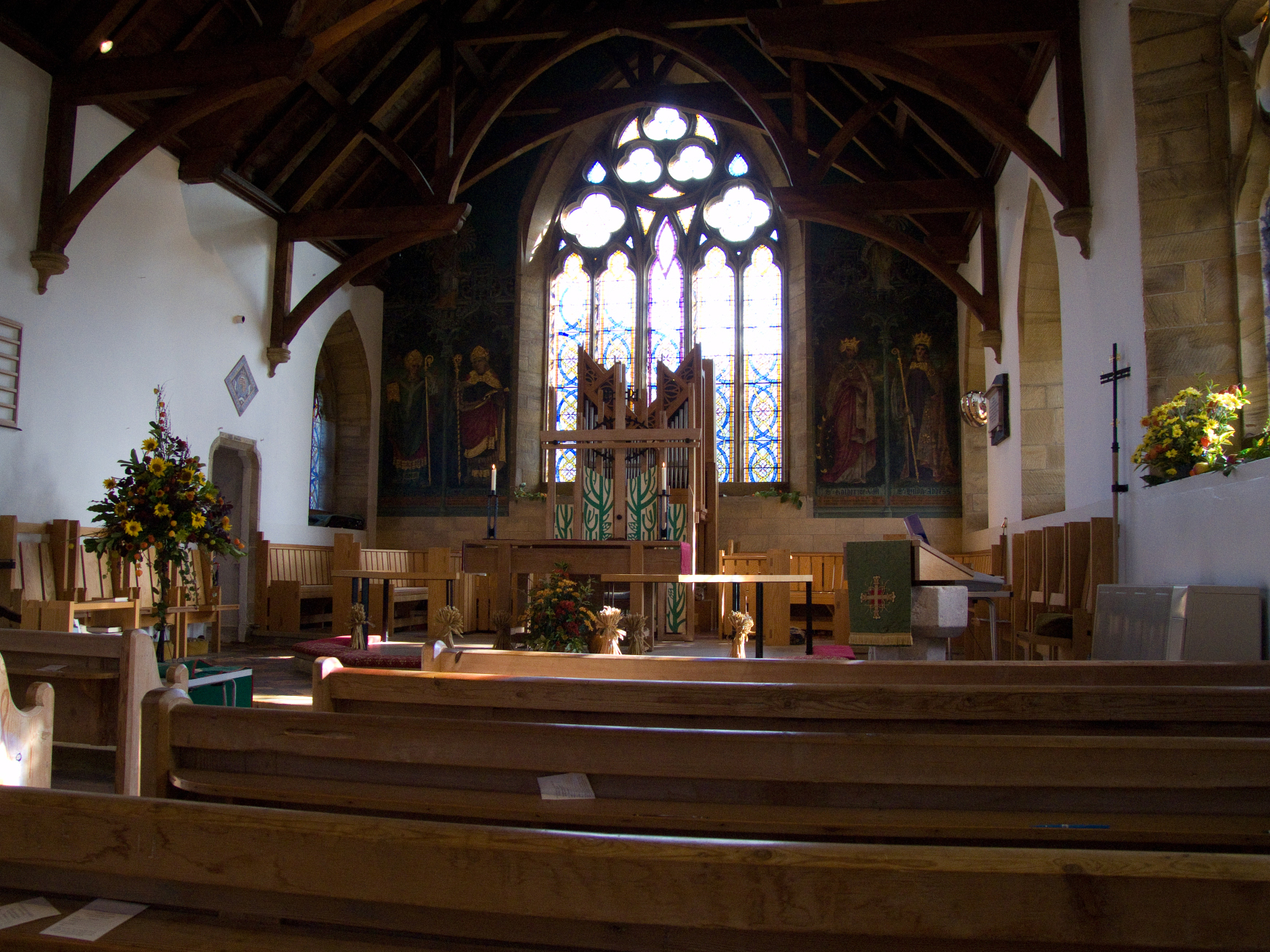
View from the nave into the chancel

The church is built in stone with a slate roof, and consists of a nave, a projection to the south door, a chancel and a west steeple. The steeple has a tower with two stages, a slit window, two-light bell openings, and an embattled parapet with crocketed corner finials. It is surmounted by a recessed spire with a cross finial. The doorway to the basement has a Romanesque arch, moved possibly from the chancel of the old church. Inside, there is a 14th-century octagonal font.

== See also ==
- Grade II* listed buildings in the East Riding of Yorkshire
- Listed buildings in Barmby Moor
