= Tyrwhitt =

Tyrwhitt is an English language surname. It may refer to:

- Charles Tyrwhitt, a British menswear retailer
- Sir Charles Tyrwhitt Dawkins (1858–1919), British Army officer
- Elizabeth Tyrwhitt (1519–1578), English writer and courtier
- Gerald Tyrwhitt-Wilson (1883–1950), British composer
- Jaqueline Tyrwhitt (1905–1983), British architect
- Mary Tyrwhitt (1903–1997), British soldier
- Nicholas Charles Tyrwhitt Wheeler (born 1965), English businessman and founder of Charles Tyrwhitt
- Reginald Tyrwhitt (1870–1951), British admiral
- Richard Tyrwhitt (1844–1900), Canadian politician
- Robert Tyrwhitt (by 1504–1572), British politician
- Robert Tyrwhitt (c. 1510–1581), British politician
- Robert Tyrwhitt (academic) (1735–1817), British scholar
- St John Tyrwhitt (1905–1961), British admiral
- Thomas Tyrwhitt (1730–1786), British scholar
- Thomas Tyrwhitt (1762–1833), British politician
- Ursula Tyrwhitt (1872–1966), English artist
- William Tyrwhitt (MP died 1522), English courtier and MP
- William Tyrwhitt (died 1591), English MP

== See also ==
- Tyrwhitt-Drake, related surname
- Mount Tyrwhitt, Alberta, Canada
- Tyrwhitt baronets in the British peerage
