= Oxenbridge =

Oxenbridge may refer to:

- Elizabeth Oxenbridge (died 1578), was an English gentlewoman, courtier, and writer.
- Goddard Oxenbridge (died 1531), was an English landowner and administrator from Sussex.
- John Oxenbridge (1608–1674), was an English Nonconformist divine, who emigrated to New England.
- Robert Oxenbridge (disambiguation)
- William Oxenbridge, English MP
