= Goddard Oxenbridge =

English landowner and administrator

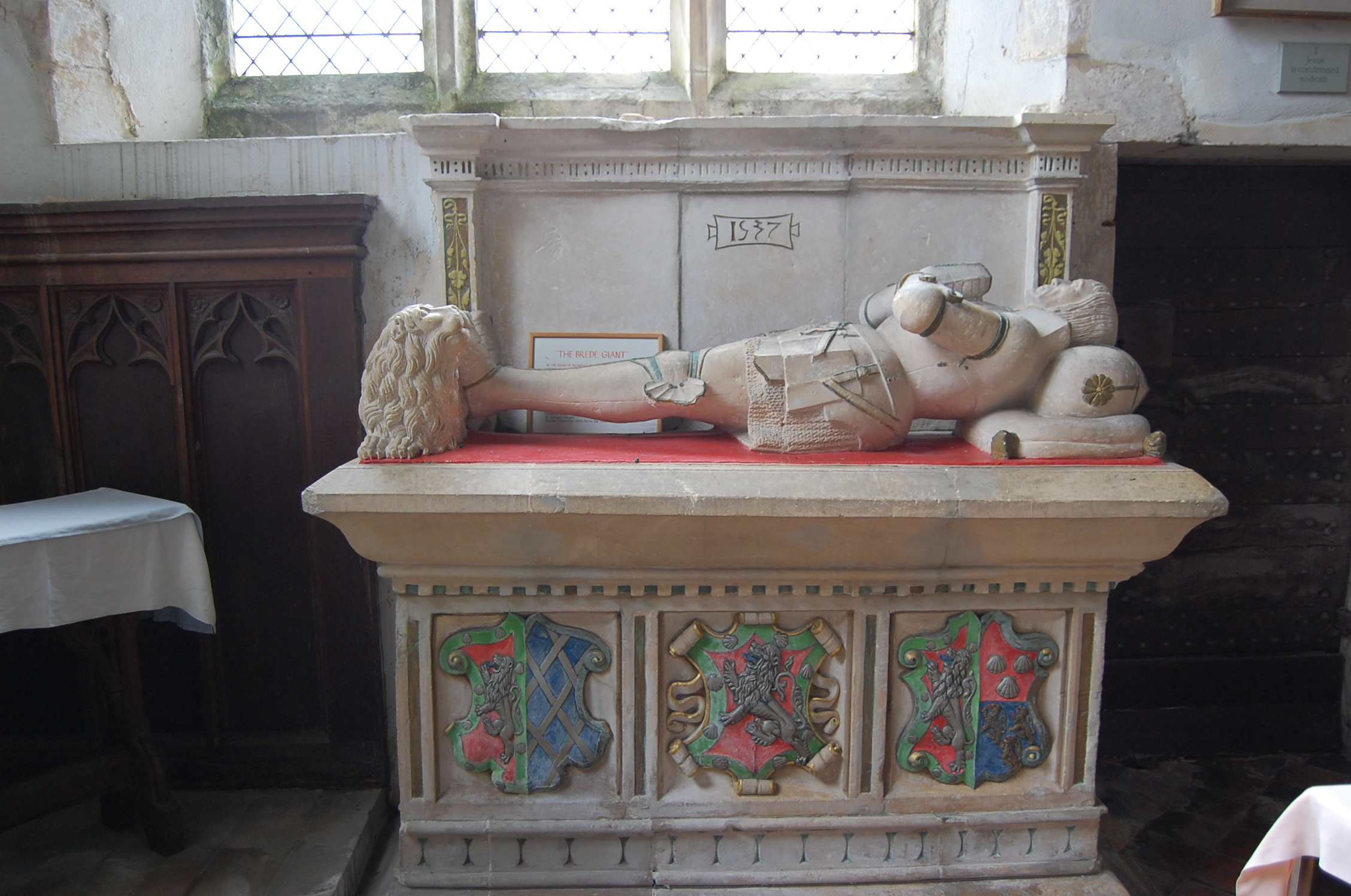
The tomb of Sir Goddard Oxenbridge in St George's church, Brede, East Sussex, England

Coat of Arms of G. Oxenbridg

Sir Goddard Oxenbridge, KB (died 1537) was an English landowner and administrator from Sussex.

== Origins ==
Prominent in East Sussex for generations, the family's home in Brede, which he improved and extended, had been built in the 14th century. Probably born in the 1470s, he was the son and heir of Robert Oxenbridge (died 1487), of Brede, and his wife Ann Livelode (died 1494). His unmarried brother was John Oxenbridge (died 1522), a Canon of Windsor, and his sister Magdalen (died 1544) was the mother of the courtier Sir Nicholas Carew.

== Life ==
As a major landowner, both by inheritance and by his first marriage, he had extensive estates to manage but his status also made him eligible for public duties. In 1506 he served his first spell as sheriff of Surrey and Sussex, being selected again in 1512 and 1519. On 23 June 1509, in honour of the coronation of King Henry VIII, he was made a Knight of the Bath. In 1511 and 1512 he was appointed to Commissions of the Peace. On 24 May 1522, he was one of the knights summoned to join the Papal legate, Cardinal Wolsey, at Canterbury and then to proceed to Dover to greet the Holy Roman Emperor, Charles V. Dying on 10 February 1531, he was buried at Brede and his tomb, now in the church of St George, bears his armoured effigy.

== Landholdings ==
His will, proved on 27 October 1531, disposed of his property which included manors, advowsons and lands, most rural but some urban, in Beckley, Brede, Brightling, Burwash, Catsfield, Crowhurst, Etchingham, Ewhurst, Guestling, Hastings, Icklesham, Northiam, Ockham, Peasmarsh, Playden, Rye, Salehurst, Snailham, Southwark (including the White Horse inn), Ticehurst, Udimore and Winchelsea. Several of these manors had descended to him by marriage from the Echyngham family patrimony, and Sir Goddard was unsuccessfully challenged for title to them by Edward Echyngham of Barsham, Suffolk, the surviving male heir of the elder Sir Thomas Echyngham (died 1444), during the early 1520s.

== Family ==
His first wife was Elizabeth, the widow of Roger Fiennes (died before 1486), possibly a son of Richard Fiennes, 7th Baron Dacre. She was the daughter and co-heiress of Sir Thomas Etchingham (died 1486), of Etchingham, and his wife Margaret, daughter of Reginald West, 6th Baron De La Warr. They had one child:

Sir Thomas (died 1540), of Etchingham, who married Elizabeth Puttenham, and had a daughter Elizabeth, wife of Sir Robert Tyrwhitt, of Kettleby.

His second wife was Anne (died 1531), the widow of John Windsor, brother of Andrew Windsor, 1st Baron Windsor, and the daughter of Sir Thomas Fiennes, of Claverham in Arlington (also a son of Richard Fiennes, 7th Baron Dacre), and his wife Anne Urswick. Their children included:

Sir Robert (died 1574), of Hurstbourne Priors, an MP and Constable of the Tower.
Elizabeth (died 1578), courtier and author, who married Sir Robert Tyrwhitt, of Leighton Bromswold.

== Legend of the Brede Giant ==
During his lifetime rumours were spread about him. The likely source were smugglers who were secretly using Sir Goddard's estate as one of their bases. Oxenbridge was said to be invulnerable to metal weapons and only wooden weapons would kill him. He had great stature, was described as a giant of a man, and referred to as the Brede Giant and the Sussex Ogre. This helped to make these stories more cogent to some of the local populace. The rumours had it that he devoured a child every night for supper. Several children had disappeared from the locality. Gossip and the smugglers spread the rumour that Goddard was a cannibal, but he was observed to be a pious Christian so the rumours were discounted by most people. The story says that Goddard Oxenbridge's life was ended when in a drunken state he was sawn in two with a wooden saw at Groaning Bridge by children who believed in the rumours. It has been suggested that these stories were spread about the Catholic Oxenbridge by Protestants during the Reformation.

Another telling of the story suggests that the legend originated some 200 years after his death. Brede Place was purchased in 1708 mainly for the land, and the house allowed to fall into disrepair. It was then that smugglers took over the house and spread rumours that it was now haunted by Oxenbridge's ghost, and either concocted the tale or built upon it about his former child-eating habits.
