= Thomas Manners, 1st Earl of Rutland =

English Earl (c.1497–1543)

Thomas Manners KG
- 1st Earl of Rutland
- Born: c. 1497
- Died: 20 September 1543
- Spouse: Eleanor Paston
- Father: George Manners, 11th Baron Ros
- Mother: Anne St Leger

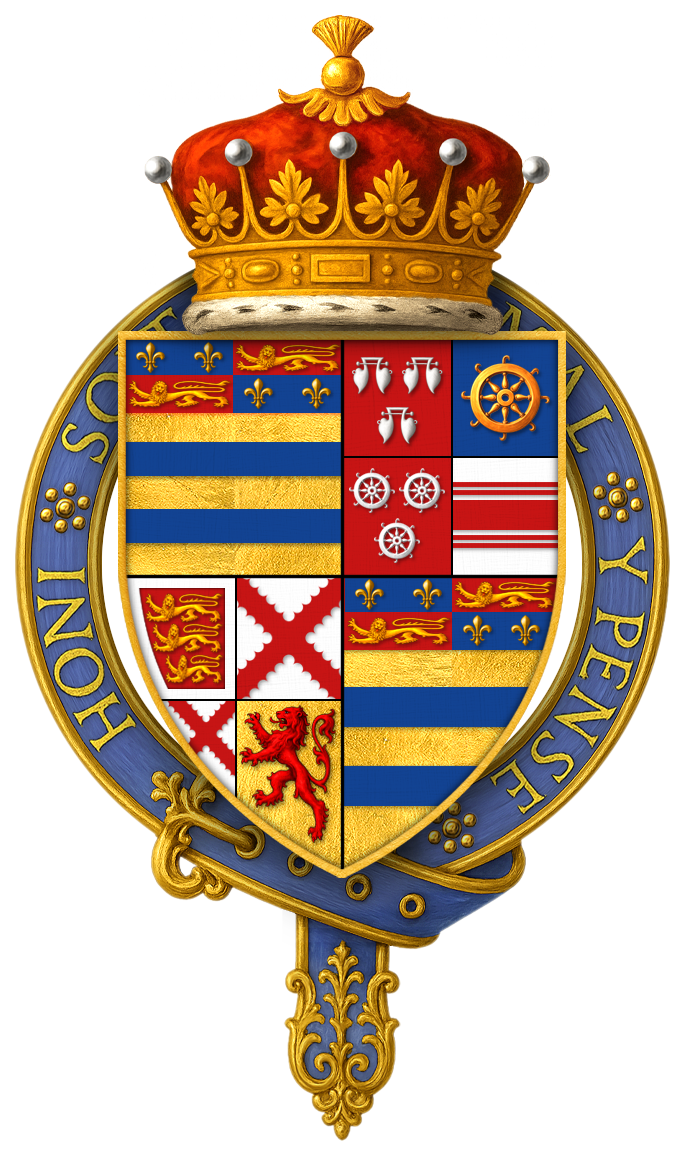
Garter-encircled arms of Sir Thomas Manners, 1st Earl of Rutland, as displayed on his Garter stall plate (see below) - Quarterly 1st and 4th Or two bars Azure a chief quarterly 1 and 4 Azure two fleurs-de-lis Or 2 and 3 Gules a lion passant guardant Or for Manners; 2nd quarterly 1 Gules three water bougets Argent for Ros; 2 Azure a Catherine wheel Or for Belvoir; 3 Gules three Catherine wheels Argent for Espec; 4 Argent a fess between two bars gemel Gules for Badlesmere; 3rd quarterly 1 England within a border Argent for Holland; 2 and 3 Argent a saltire engrailed Gules for Tiptoft; 4 Or a lion rampant Gules for Charleton.

Arms of Manners, Earls and Dukes of Rutland: Or, two bars azure a chief quarterly azure and gules; in the 1st and 4th quarters two fleurs-de-lis and in the 2nd and 3rd a lion passant guardant all or The original coat of arms of the Manners family showed a chief gules. The quartering in chief, with the fleurs-de-lis of the Royal arms of France and lion passant guardant of the Royal arms of England, was granted as an augmentation by King Henry VIII to Thomas Manners at the time of his creation as Earl of Rutland, in recognition of his descent in the maternal line from Richard Plantagenet, 3rd Duke of York, a descendant of King Edward III (1327–1377)

Thomas Manners, 1st Earl of Rutland, 12th Baron Ros, KG (c. 1497 – 20 September 1543), of Belvoir Castle in Leicestershire (adjacent to the small county of Rutland), was created Earl of Rutland by King Henry VIII in 1525.

== Early life ==
Thomas was the son of Sir George Manners, 11th Baron Ros (c. 1470 – 1513) by his wife Anne St Leger (1476–1526). His maternal grandparents were Sir Thomas St Leger (c. 1440–1483) and Anne of York (1439–1476), a daughter of Richard Plantagenet, 3rd Duke of York and Cecily Neville. She was thus an elder sister of Kings Edward IV (1461–1483) and of his brother and eventual successor, Richard III (1483–1485). Her other brothers were Edmund, Earl of Rutland and George Plantagenet, 1st Duke of Clarence. Her sisters included Elizabeth of York, Duchess of Suffolk and Margaret of York. Anne St Leger's first cousin, Elizabeth of York, married Henry Tudor and was the mother of Henry VIII and grandmother of Elizabeth I. Thomas Manners was thus a second cousin to Henry VIII.

== Career ==
On 22 June 1513, Thomas landed at Calais on the French expedition. In 1513 he became Baron Ros, probably aged 16 or 17, on his father's death and was summoned in 1515 to Parliament. He was at the Field of the Cloth of Gold in 1520 and at King Henry VIII's meeting with Charles V, Holy Roman Emperor afterwards.

In December 1521, Baron Ros became cupbearer to the king. In January 1522 he was made steward of Pickering, Yorkshire, and from April to October of the same year he held the appointment of Lord Warden of the East Marches, in which he was succeeded by Henry Percy, 6th Earl of Northumberland. He received the wardenship of Sherwood Forest on 12 July 1524, an office which afterwards became practically hereditary in his family. He was appointed a Knight of the Garter on 24 April 1525 and on 18 June 1525 he was made Earl of Rutland, a title previously held by members of the house of York.

He was a great favourite of King Henry VIII and received many grants, including the keepership of Enfield Chase on 12 July 1526, and Belvoir Castle, which remains the chief seat of his family. On 11 October 1532 he landed with the king in France. He was at the coronation of Queen Anne Boleyn in 1533 and later took part in her trial. Rutland was actively engaged in meeting the Pilgrimage of Grace. He held a joint command with the Earls of Huntingdon and Shrewsbury and marched to Nottingham and thence to Newark, Southwell, and Doncaster against the northern rebels.

He was steward of many monasteries, and from his various ancestors had claims through their having founded certain of the houses. Hence at the Dissolution of the Monasteries, he received numerous grants of monastic property. In Leicestershire he obtained Charley, Garradon, and by exchange, Croxton; in Yorkshire he received Beverley, Warter, and Rievaulx by exchange. Jointly with Robert Tyrwhit, he obtained Belvoir, Eagle, and Kyme in Lincolnshire, and in Yorkshire Nun Burnham.

When Anne of Cleves came to England to marry the king, Rutland was appointed her lord chamberlain and met her at Shooter's Hill on her approach to Greenwich Palace, after her unfortunate interview with the king at Rochester. In 1542 he became constable of Nottingham Castle. He went to the border again on 7 August 1542 as Warden of the Marches, but was recalled, in consequence of illness, in November of the same year. From Newark-on-Trent he wrote on 7 November to the Council of the North: "As Gode best knows, I ame in a poyur and febvll estat". He died on 20 September 1543.

== Knight of the Garter ==
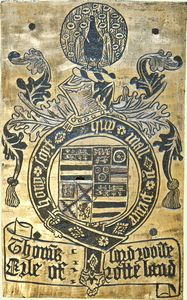
Garter stall plate of Thomas Manners, 1st Earl of Rutland, St George's Chapel, Windsor Castle

Manners, about two months before receipt of his earldom, was nominated by Henry VIII as a Knight of the Garter in 1525. His Garter stall plate of brass inlaid with coloured enamel, survives in St George's Chapel, Windsor Castle. It is inscribed: Thom(a)s lord roosse, Erle of rotteland. Above the escutcheon, circumscribed by the Garter, is the crest of Manners: A peacock in pride. The arms displayed are: quarterly:
1 and 4, or, two bars azure a chief quarterly of the last and gules, on the 1st and 4th, two fleurs-de-lis or, on the 2nd and 3rd, a lion passant guardant or (Manners, with augmentation for the 1st Earl);
2, a grand quarter consisting of

1, gules, three water bougets argent (Ros)
2, azure, a Catherine wheel or (Belvoir)
3, gules, three Catherine wheels argent (Espec)
4, argent, a fess between two bars gemels gules (Badlesmere)

3, a grand quarter consisting of

1, gules, three lions pasant guardant or, within a bordure argent (Holland, Earls of Kent)
2 and 3, argent, a saltire engrailed gules (Tiptoft)
4, or, a lion rampant gules (Edward Charleton, 5th Baron Charleton of Powys (1370–1421))

== Marriages and children ==
Arms of Paston: Argent, six fleurs-de-lys azure a chief indented or. These arms are visible impaled by the arms of the 1st Earl of Rutland in the 19th century stained glass windows of the Rutland Chapel, St George's Chapel, Windsor Castle

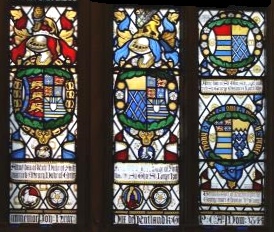
Heraldic glass in the Rutland Chapel, St George's Chapel, Windsor Castle, erected in 1849 by Charles Manners, 6th Duke of Rutland. It shows far left the arms of Anne of York, Duchess of Exeter (1439–1476) impaled by the arms of her 1st husband Henry Holland, 3rd Duke of Exeter. To the right of the last are her arms impaled by the arms of her 2nd husband Sir Thomas St Leger (c. 1440–1483), KG. The rightmost window shows top: the arms of Anne's daughter Anne St Leger impaled by the arms of her husband George Manners, 11th Baron Ros (c. 1470–1513). Below are the arms of his son Thomas Manners, 1st Earl of Rutland (c. 1492–1543) impaling the arms of his 2nd wife Eleanor Paston

He married twice:

- Firstly in about 1512 to Elizabeth Lovell. The marriage ended in 1513.
- Secondly in about 1523 he married Eleanor Paston, daughter of Sir William Paston of Norfolk. They had the following children:

=== Sons ===
- Henry Manners, 2nd Earl of Rutland (1526–1563)
- Sir John Manners (c. 1534–1611), of Haddon Hall, Derbyshire, husband of Dorothy Vernon, grandfather of John Manners, 8th Earl of Rutland and great-grandfather of John Manners, 1st Duke of Rutland and Francis Talbot, 11th Earl of Shrewsbury.
- Sir Thomas Manners, grandfather of Thomas Vavasour, 1st Baronet.
- Roger Manners (died 1607) of Uffington, a squire of the body to Elizabeth I, died unmarried
- Oliver Manners, Esq.

=== Daughters ===
- Gertrude Manners, who married George Talbot, 6th Earl of Shrewsbury and was the mother of Gilbert Talbot, 7th Earl of Shrewsbury and Edward Talbot, 8th Earl of Shrewsbury.
- Anne Manners, who married Henry Neville, 5th Earl of Westmorland and was the mother of Charles Neville, 6th Earl of Westmorland.
- Frances Manners, who married Henry Nevill, 6th Baron Bergavenny and was grandmother of Francis Fane, 1st Earl of Westmorland.
- Katherine Manners, who married Sir Henry Capell, Sheriff of Essex.
- Elizabeth Manners (c. 1530 – 8 August 1570), who married Sir John Savage of Rocksavage, whose mother was Elizabeth Somerset, daughter of Charles Somerset, 1st Earl of Worcester by his wife Elizabeth Herbert, 3rd Baroness Herbert. She was the grandmother of Thomas Savage, 1st Viscount Savage and the great-grandmother of John Savage, 2nd Earl Rivers and was the great-great-grandmother of Charles Paulet, 1st Duke of Bolton.
- Isabel Manners, died young.

== Death and burial ==
He died on 20 September 1543 and was buried in St Mary's Church in Bottesford, Leicestershire. His body was embalmed with spices purchased in Nottingham and a surgeon encased it in wax. A plumber then encased it in a close-fitting leaden shell.

== Monument ==
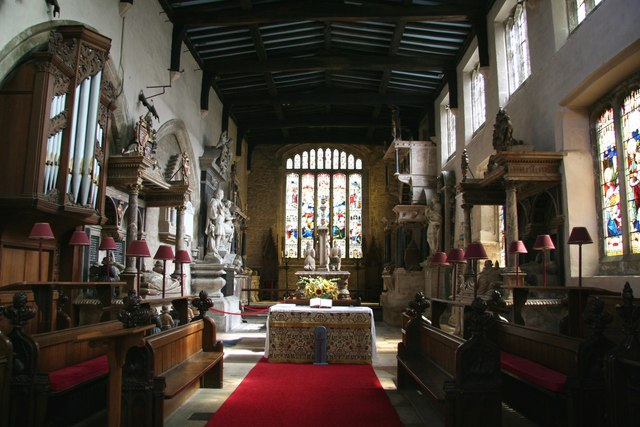
View of chancel of St Mary's Church, Bottesford, with its many monuments to the Earls and Dukes of Rutland

His surviving alabaster chest tomb in the chancel of St Mary's Church, Bottesford, Leicestershire, was created by Richard Parker of Burton-on-Trent with John Lupton (rough mason) and his father, over a period of six days, the floor having been strengthened to the weight of the tomb. Thomas Richard Parker "the alabaster man" was paid £20 for the sculpture and the supervision of its positioning. Surviving accounts at Belvoir Castle record in considerable detail the arrangements for this work and the funeral. As well as commemorating the 1st Earl of Rutland and his wife this monument also marks the first of the future burials in the church of eight earls and four dukes over a period of almost 250 years.

=== Description ===
The Earl's effigy is dressed in chain mail and full plate armour with a loose military tabard over which he wears the mantle of the Order of the Garter while on his left leg is the Garter itself. His head wears a basic form of coronet and rests on his tilt-heaume on top of which is the Manners crest of a peacock in pride on a Cap of Maintenance. The feet rest on a unicorn, from which the horn is now missing. The effigy of the countess is dressed in a gown and a short cape and wears an ermine-trimmed mantle fastened by a cordon whose ends reach almost to her feet, under which is a griffon. Tasselled cushions support her head. The base of the tomb is decorated with corner pilasters, tasselled swags and "weeper" figures representing knights, ladies and others.

Legal offices
Preceded by The Earl of Essex	Justice in Eyre north of the Trent; 1540–1543	Succeeded by Sir Anthony Browne
Peerage of England
New creation	Earl of Rutland; 1525–1543	Succeeded by Henry Manners
Preceded by George Manners	Baron Ros; 1513–1543	Succeeded by Henry Manners
