= William Tyrwhitt =

16th-century English politician

William Tyrwhitt (died 1591) was an English landowner and politician who sat as Member of Parliament (MP) for Huntingdon in March 1553 but took no further part in public life under Queen Elizabeth I because of his Roman Catholicism, for which he underwent spells of imprisonment.

== Origins ==
Born by 1531, he was the eldest son of the MP Sir Robert Tyrwhitt, of Kettleby in Lincolnshire, and his wife Elizabeth (died 1590), daughter of Sir Thomas Oxenbridge, of Etchingham in Sussex. With centuries of service in local and national government, his family was long established in Lincolnshire and well connected, his sister Ursula having married Edmund Sheffield, 1st Earl of Mulgrave.

== Life ==
Reaching majority by 1552, he was party to a legal dispute over lands he bought in Lincolnshire, being described as “William Tyrwhitt esquire, a young gentleman, son and heir apparent of Sir Robert Tyrwhitt of Lincolnshire, a man of great power in those parts”. In 1553 he was selected as MP for the borough of Huntingdon, his father being in the same Parliament for the seat of Lincolnshire.

After this, he seems to have lived a private life, his home being Twigmoor Hall in Holme until in 1581 he succeeded to his father's lands. However, his religious beliefs were not private and in 1580 he was taken into custody in the Tower of London as a suspected Catholic. After 12 months, he was set free on paying bail of 300 pounds (over 75,000 pounds at 2016 value) and promising to take instruction in Anglicanism. Accused of dissuading friends from adopting Anglicanism, he was taken back into prison, this time in the Fleet, at the end of 1581. Though allowed out to attend his father's funeral in Lincolnshire, it emerged that he had heard a mass while in the Fleet and had not therefore renounced Catholicism. For the rest of his life he was under surveillance and, though not in prison, was rarely allowed home.

Allowed to sort out his mother's affairs after her death, he died on 18 July 1591. His will, made two months earlier, asked for his body to be buried beside his father in All Saints church at Bigby and for lands to be sold, including the manor of Fillingham, in order to provide legacies for his children.

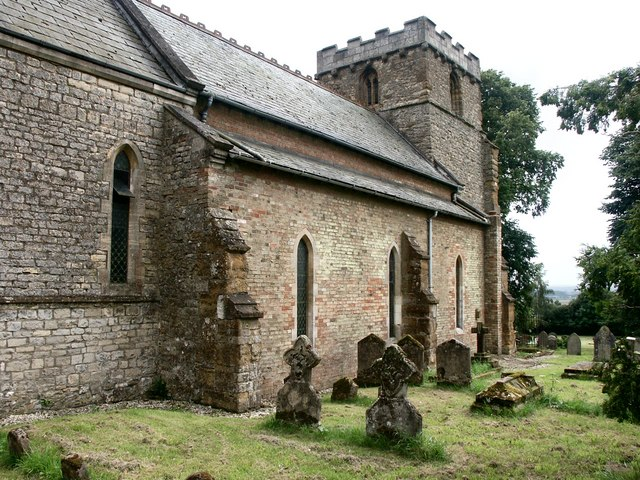
All Saints, Bigby

== Family ==
In 1576 he married Elizabeth, daughter of Sir Peter Frescheville (died 1582), of Staveley in Derbyshire, and his first wife Elizabeth, daughter of the MP Sir Gervase Clifton, of Clifton. Her sister Frances was the wife of Sir Gervase Holles and her half-brother was the MP Sir Peter Frescheville.

With Elizabeth, he is recorded as having five sons and four daughters. Four of the sons left no children, but all four daughters married:

Robert (died 1617), his heir, in 1594 married Bridget (died 1604), daughter of John Manners, 4th Earl of Rutland.
Margaret, married Nicholas Rookwood, of Euston, Suffolk.
Mary, married first Robert Bradford (died 1596) and secondly Robert Monson, of Northorpe.
Ursula, married Sir William Babthorpe, of Babthorpe.
Martha, married Edmund Colles, of Leigh in Worcestershire, grandson of the MP Edmund Colles and like her father a recusant.

Some records show a fifth daughter Elizabeth, who married Ambrose Rookwood, executed in 1606 for his part in the Gunpowder Plot. Other sources say his widow Elizabeth married Edward Rookwood (born 1554), of Rookwood.
