= Francis Manners =

Francis Manners may refer to:

- Francis Manners, 6th Earl of Rutland (1578–1632), English nobleman
- Francis Manners, 4th Baron Manners (1897–1972), British soldier, landowner, and peer

== See also ==
- Frances Manners (disambiguation)
