= Thomas Bentley =

Thomas Bentley may refer to:

- Thomas Bentley (director) (1879–1951), British film director
- Thomas Bentley (manufacturer) (1731–1780), English manufacturer of porcelain, known for his partnership with Josiah Wedgwood
- Thomas Bentley (scholar) (d. 1742), classical scholar
- Thomas John Bentley (1891–1983), Canadian politician, agrologist, farmer and organizer
- Thomas Whitefield Bentley (1884–1952), life insurance company manager and political figure on Prince Edward Island
- Thomas Bentley, editor of The Monument of Matrones (1586)
- Tom Bentley, author and policy analyst based in Australia

== See also ==
- Tom Bentley Throckmorton (1885–1961), American neurologist
