= Bridget Tyrwhitt =

Bridget Tyrwhitt may refer to:

- Lady Bridget Wingfield, married name Bridget Tyrwhitt during her third marriage
- Lady Bridget Manners, married name Bridget Tyrwhitt
