= Agnes Oxenbridge and Elizabeth Etchingham =

Memorialized in a plaque at an English church

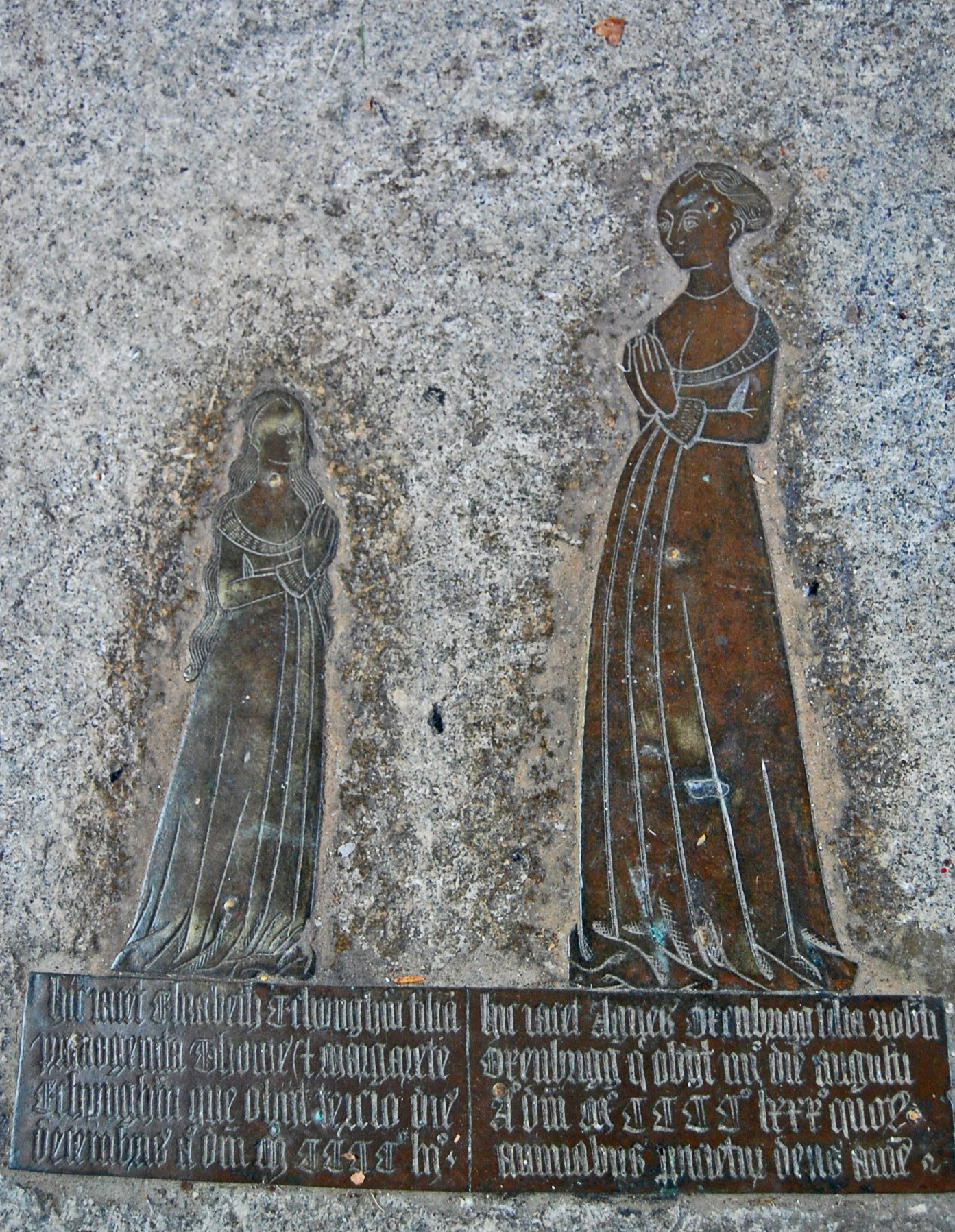
Brass of Elizabeth Etchingham and Agnes Oxenbridge, Etchingham church

Agnes Oxenbridge (died 4 August 1480) and Elizabeth Etchingham (died 3 December 1452) have a joint memorial brass on the floor of the side aisle of The Assumption of Blessed Mary and St Nicholas church at Etchingham, England. The brass is in front of the monument to Etchingham's ancestors. The Latin inscription under Elizabeth Etchingham identifies her as the first daughter of Thomas and Margaret Etchingham. The text under Agnes Oxenbridge identifies her as the daughter of Robert Oxenbridge.

Both Judith M. Bennett in The Lesbian Premodern and Alan Bray in Homosexuality in Renaissance England observed that the arrangement of the memorial brasses resembled those made for married couples, and therefore speculate that the brasses for Oxenbridge and Etchingham represented a particular friendship. This, they infer, may have been a medieval example of Lesbian relationship.

== Biography ==
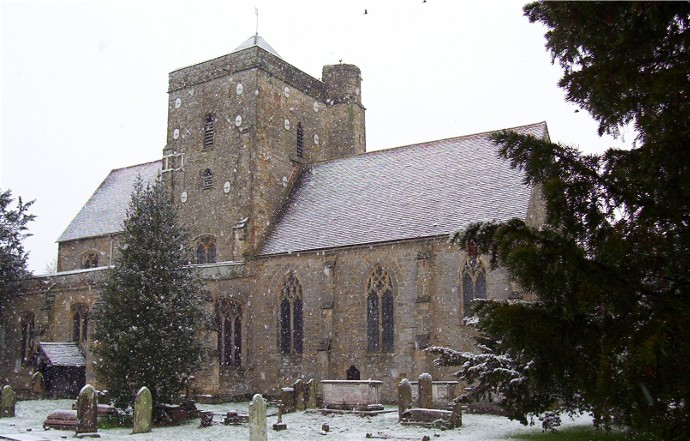
Etchingham Church in snow

Elizabeth Etchingham was the daughter of Thomas Etchingham II (1424/25–1486) and Margaret West, daughter of Reginald West, 6th Baron De La Warr. The monument to Thomas Etchingham I and his parents is in front of the memorial brass of his granddaughter.

Agnes Oxenbridge was the daughter of Robert Oxenbridge (died 1487), of Brede, and his wife Ann Livelode (or Anne Lyvelode) (died 1494).

The Etchingham and Oxenbridge families were deeply connected: Thomas Oxenbridge (died 1540) inherited both Etchingham and Mountfield manors from his mother Elizabeth, sister of Elizabeth Etchingham, born in 1460, 8 years after the death of her sister; she married in 1500 Goddard Oxenbridge (died 1531), son of Robert Oxenbridge and Anne Lyvelode, and therefore brother of Agnes Oxenbridge.
