= Frederick Douglas Miller =

British photographer (1874–1961)

- Born: 6 December 1874; Brede, near Hastings
- Died: 7 June 1961 (aged 86); Shoreham-by-Sea
- Occupations: Photographer and postcard publisher

Frederick Douglas Miller (6 December 1874 – 7 June 1961) was an English photographer, usually known as F. Douglas Miller. He was born on 6 December 1874, in the small village of Brede, East Sussex, north of Hastings.

He was the son of Matilda Goldsmith and Frederick Miller, who married in Eastbourne on 4 March 1874. Matilda Goldsmith was born in Newenden, Kent in May 1848. Fred Miller was born in Hailsham in February 1850. Matilda's father, William Goldsmith was a farm labourer whereas Fred Miller and his father, Edward Miller were both professional photographers (according to their marriage certificate records).

His parents settled in Haywards Heath in 1880, and before the end of the century Miller had set up "The Mid-Sussex Photographic Studio" in Haywards Heath, offering photographs "in any size and newest styling" and services including "copying and enlarging". He also photographed outdoor events such as garden parties. In 1903 he started to publish and sell picture postcards, and the business grew and became successful.

He married Kate Elizabeth Peerless in 1905. Miller ran the studio until he sold the business to Ebenezer William Pannell in February 1916, and moved to Worthing with his wife, to live out their lives. His wife died on 19 March 1959, and Miller died in Southlands Hospital in Shoreham-by-Sea on 7 June 1961.

== Examples of his work ==
- "Gin Jack – Douglas Miller/London 1954". ginjack.tumblr.com.
- Pictures of M. K. Gandhi in 1931 in London, cf. gettyimages ?
- Uncaptioned picture of a De Havilland Comet parked in front of a Vickers Viscount.

https://www.adsgroup.org.uk/blog/aerospace/de-havilland-comet-britain-powers-commercial-jet-aviation/ Keystone/Getty Images
