= Tyrwhitt-Drake =

Tyrwhitt-Drake is an English surname. Notable people with the surname include:

- Bill Tyrwhitt-Drake (1926–2008), English cricketer
- Charles Francis Tyrwhitt-Drake (1846–1874), explorer, naturalist, archaeologist, and linguist who died during the PEF Survey of Palestine
- Edward Tyrwhitt Drake (1832–1904), English clergyman and cricketer
- Garrard Tyrwhitt-Drake (1881–1964), English businessman, zoo owner and author
- Montague Tyrwhitt-Drake (1830–1908), English-born lawyer, judge and political figure in Canada
- Thomas Drake Tyrwhitt-Drake (1749–1810), British Member of Parliament
- Thomas Tyrwhitt-Drake (1783–1852), British Member of Parliament
- William Tyrwhitt-Drake (1785–1848), British Member of Parliament

== Others ==
- Francis Tyrwhitt Drake Wilson (1876–1964), British cricketer
- Tyrwhitt-Drake Museum of Carriages in Tithe Barn, Maidstone

== See also ==
- Tyrwhitt (surname)
- Drake (surname)
