= Florence Aylward =

English composer

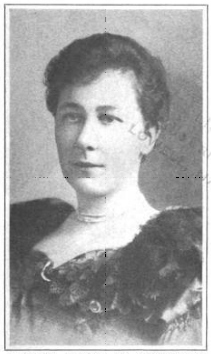
- Born: March 10, 1862; Brede, East Sussex, England
- Died: 14 October 1950 (aged 88); St Leonards-on-Sea, East Sussex, England
- Occupation: Composer
- Spouse: Harold Arthur Kinder

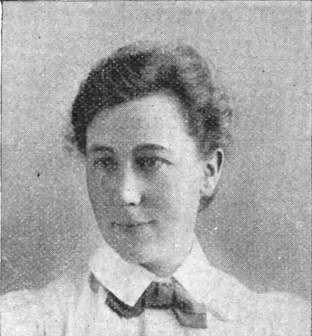
Florence Aylward (1895)

Florence Aylward (10 March 1862 – 14 October 1950) was an English composer known for ballads.

== Early life ==
Aylward was born at Brede Rectory in Brede, East Sussex, England in 1862, the daughter of the Rector of Brede, Augustus Aylward and his wife Mary, who was the eldest daughter of Thomas Frewen of Brickwall in Sussex. Aylward studied at the Guildhall School. Aylward began composing at an early age, and her songs began to be performed at local concerts when she was 12.

== Career ==
Aylward's early composition efforts caught the attention of William Boosey, of the publisher Boosey & Hawkes. Aylward's first song was published in 1888, entitled "Day Dawn". The words were based on a translation of a Victor Hugo poem by Alice K. Sawyer, with music composed by Aylward. The Graphic described it as a "simple and graceful ballad". In 1890, a collection of six of her compositions was published for soprano under the title "Album of Six Songs", which included "The Boat of My Lover", "An Egyptian Lament" and "The Milkmaid's Song".

In total, she published at least 150 songs. Around 50 are listed in Padzírek's Universal Handbook of Musical Literature.

== Family life ==
Aylward married Harold Kinder, an architect, in 1881 in Rye, Sussex. They had one son, Harold, born in 1886. Aylward's husband died in 1940.

== Selected works ==
- "Beloved it is morn"
- "Call of Life"
- "Love's Coronation"
- "Made a Man"
- "Morning and You!"
- "Song of the Bow"
- "Thrush to his Love"
- "For your sake"
- "The Country Faith"
- "Deep in my heart a lute lay hid"
- "The bird I love the best"
- "Vitai Lampada" (1900, words by Henry Newbolt)
