= Frances Manners =

Frances Manners may refer to:

- Frances Manners, Baroness Bergavenny (died 1576), née Neville
- Frances Manners, Duchess of Rutland (born 1937)
- Frances Cecil, Countess of Exeter (died 1669) (1630–1669), née Manners
- Frances Carpenter, Countess of Tyrconnel (1753–1792), née Manners
