= Dumb Woman's Lane =

Street in East Sussex, England

- Street sign of Dumb Woman's Lane

- Location within East Sussex
- Location: Udimore
- Postal code: TN31
- Coordinates: 50.9406°N 0.6995°E

Dumb Woman's Lane (sometimes Dumbwomans Lane) is a street located in the civil parish of Udimore, near Winchelsea in East Sussex, England. The street has achieved a level of notoriety because of its unusual name. While the etymology remains unconfirmed, sources attribute it to a mute woman (the word dumb meaning "mute" rather than "stupid") residing on or near the lane, likely in the 18th century. The street is also known as the residence of the comedian Spike Milligan from 1988 until his death in 2002.

== Description ==
Dumb Woman's Lane provides access between the B2089 Udimore Road, which runs from Rye to Winchelsea, via a junction with both Winchelsea Lane and Float Lane. A single-lane highway, the road is narrow and has a hair-pin bend. There are fewer than ten residences located along it.

== History ==
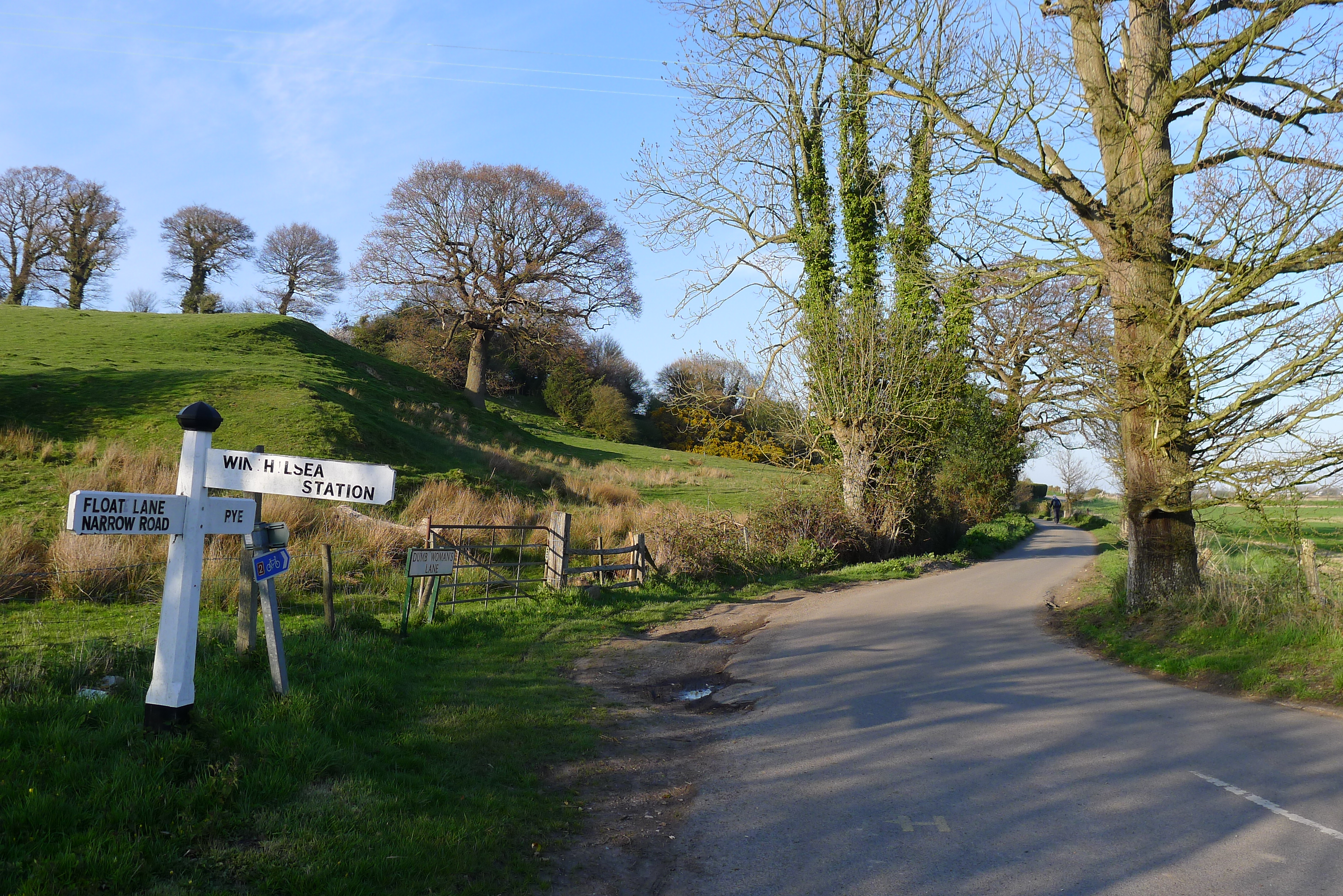
Dumb Woman's Lane and signposts directing to Rye and Winchelsea

The street's history and etymology are not confirmed. Sources for the street report two explanations. The first is that the source of the name is a mute woman who sold traditional medicines and once lived on the lane. The second is that the lane is named after a woman who witnessed the activities of smuggling gangs in the area and had her tongue removed to prevent her from informing authorities.

The author Alex Preston wrote about 18th century smuggling in the area in his 2022 historical fiction novel Winchelsea. In the novel's afterword, he covers the true history of the region's smuggling. According to Preston, the lane was named after a local publican's wife who had her tongue removed for reporting the activities of the Hawkhurst smuggling gang in the 1740s.

The Irish comedian Spike Milligan lived in a house on the lane from 1988 until his death in 2002. Milligan was acquainted with the singer Paul McCartney who, knowing he lived there, wrote a poem about Dumb Woman's Lane which he recited on a visit. Following his death, Milligan was buried in the nearby St Thomas' Church.

Dumb Woman's Lane has achieved a level of notoriety because of its controversial name, which has been reported as affecting house prices. The lane is often visited for people to have their photograph taken with the signposts, which are also occasionally stolen.
