= Henry Manners =

Henry Manners may refer to:

- Henry Manners, 2nd Earl of Rutland (1526–1563)
- Henry Manners, 8th Duke of Rutland (1852–1925), British politician
