= Gertrude Talbot, Countess of Shrewsbury =

English Elizabethan noblewoman

Lady Gertrude Talbot, Countess of Shrewsbury (c. 1525 – January 1567), formerly Gertrude Manners, was an English noblewoman of the Elizabethan period.

Gertrude was born in Helmsley Castle, the daughter of Thomas Manners, 1st Earl of Rutland and his wife, Eleanor Paston. Gertrude married George Talbot, later 6th Earl of Shrewsbury on 28 April 1539.

Their children were:

- Francis, Lord Talbot (died 1582) who married Anne Herbert, a daughter of the William Herbert, 1st Earl of Pembroke and Anne Parr, but had no children. "Lord Talbot" was a courtesy title, being one of his father's lesser titles. Francis, Lord Talbot's wife Anne Herbert was a niece of Katherine Parr, the sixth Queen of King Henry VIII.
- Gilbert Talbot, 7th Earl of Shrewsbury, who married his step-sister Mary Cavendish and had three daughters.
- Henry Talbot (1563–1596), who married Elizabeth Rayner and had two daughters.
- Edward Talbot, 8th Earl of Shrewsbury (1561–1617), who married Joane Ogle and had no children.
- Katherine Talbot (died 1576), who married Henry Herbert, 2nd Earl of Pembroke, and had no children. Henry was brother to Anne who married Francis, Lord Talbot, in a double marriage of siblings. He was also a nephew of Queen Katherine Parr.
- Mary Talbot, who married Sir George Savile, 1st Baronet of Barrowby, Lincolnshire, and had one son
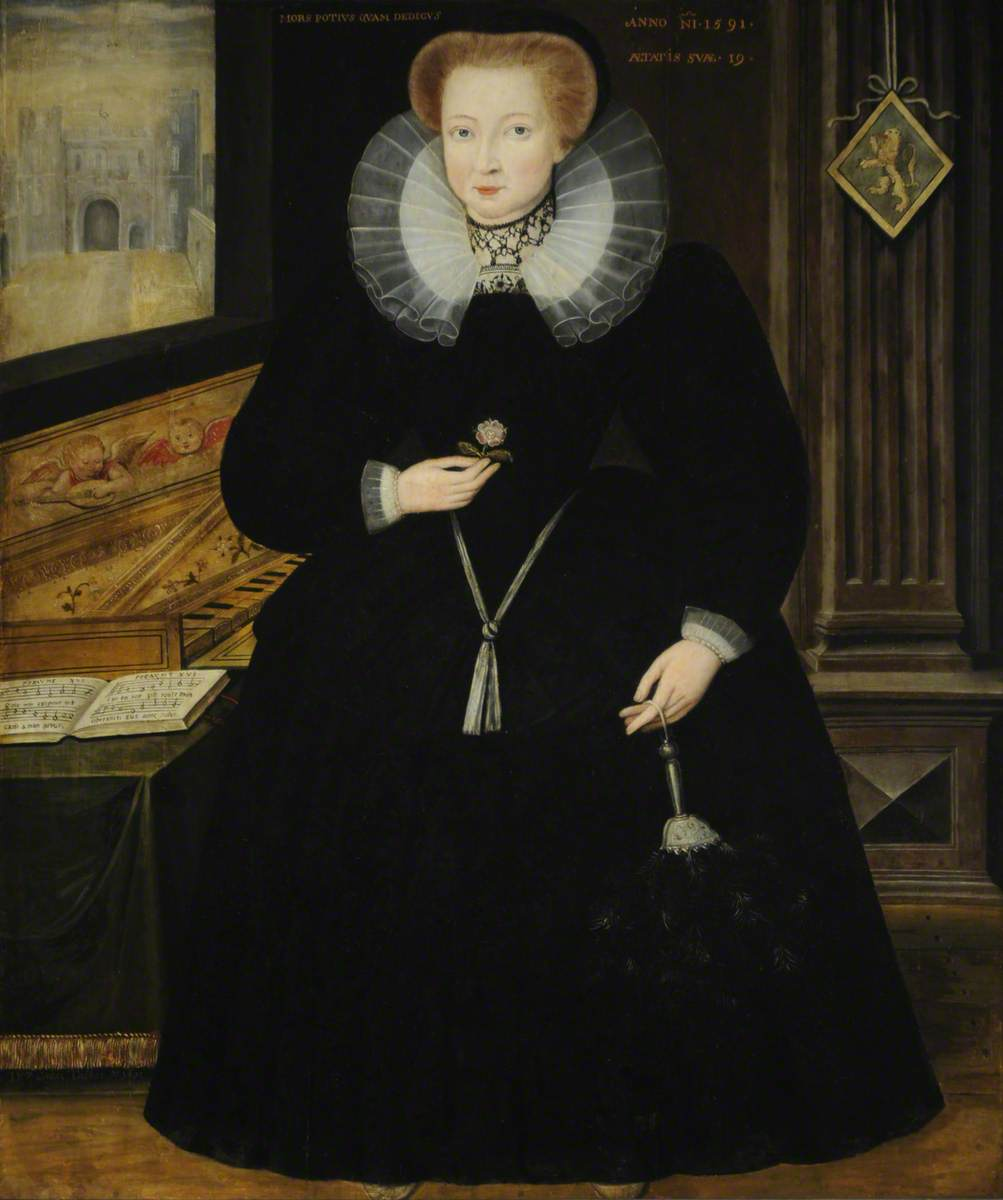
- Lady Grace Talbot (1562 – after 1625) – Mrs. Henry Cavendish. Gertrude's daughter
  Grace Talbot, who married her step-brother Henry Cavendish (1550–1616), son of Sir William Cavendish of Chatsworth in Derbyshire by his wife Elizabeth Hardwick, in another double marriage of siblings; they had no children.

The Countess died when her children were still young, and was buried in the family vault in Sheffield on 16 January 1567. A few months later, her widower began a courtship of their friend and neighbour, the thrice-widowed Bess of Hardwick, which culminated in their marriage.
