= Eleanor Manners, Countess of Rutland =

English noblewoman and courtier

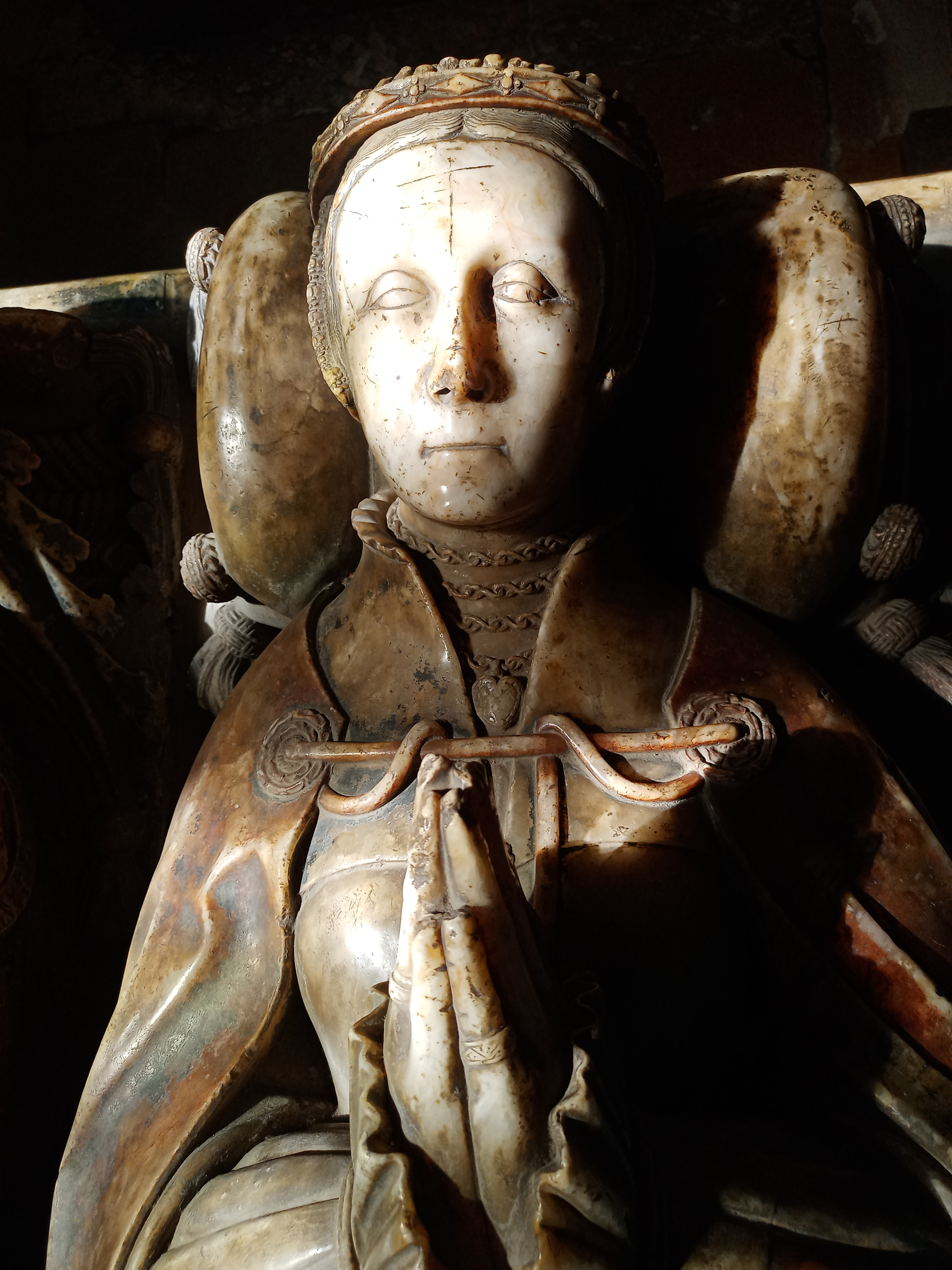
Tomb effigy of the Countess of Rutland

Eleanor Manners, Countess of Rutland (née Paston; c. 1495 – 1551), was lady-in-waiting to five wives of King Henry VIII of England: Anne Boleyn, Jane Seymour, Anne of Cleves, Katherine Howard, and Katherine Parr.

== Marriage ==
The daughter of Sir William Paston (son of Sir John Paston) and Bridget Heydon (daughter of Sir Henry Heydon), she married Thomas Manners, 12th Baron de Ros, by 1523, and became known as Countess of Rutland when he was elevated to the earldom few years later. The first of the couple's eleven or more children, a daughter named Anne, was born the same year or soon thereafter. Lady Rutland's continuous pregnancies did not hinder her career at court and she continued bearing children until 1539, the last child, a daughter named Katherine, being born weeks after the wedding of another daughter, Gertrude. Katherine was named in honour of the Duchess of Suffolk, whom Lady Rutland admired.

=== Life at court ===
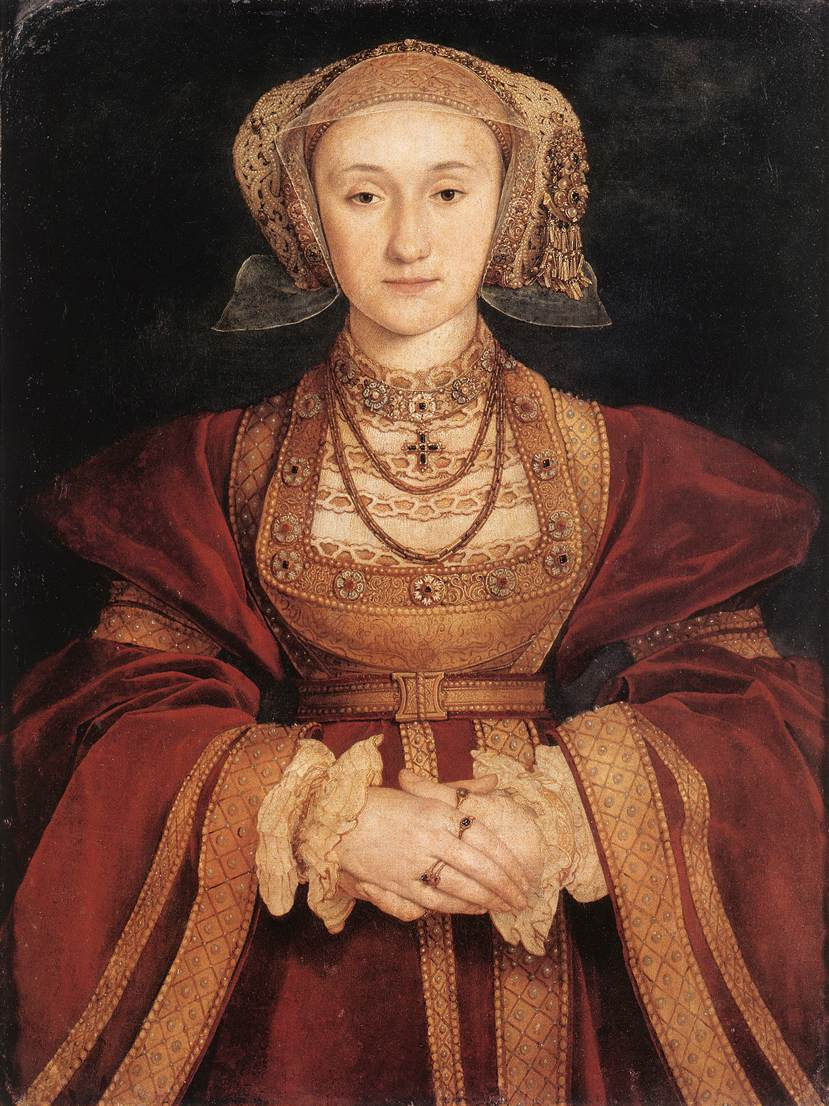
Anne of Cleves, one of Lady Rutland's mistresses

Lady Rutland's earliest recorded appearance at court was at the investiture of Anne Boleyn with the Marquessate of Pembroke in 1532. The next month, Lady Rutland and her husband accompanied Henry VIII and Anne to Calais, where the latter was to be introduced to King Francis I of France. Despite their support for Henry's reform, Lord and Lady Rutland remained conservative Catholics. It is likely that she became Anne Boleyn's lady-in-waiting after she married Henry, a position she held under the next three queens – Jane Seymour, Anne of Cleves and Katherine Howard.

She was a senior lady-in-waiting to Anne of Cleves, the King's fourth wife, and knew that the marriage was unconsummated. In February 1540, Anne praised the King as a kind husband, saying to Lady Rutland: "When he comes to bed he kisseth me, and he taketh me by the hand, and biddeth me 'Good night, sweetheart'; and in the morning kisseth me and biddeth 'Farewell, darling'." Lady Rutland responded: "Madam, there must be more than this, or it will be long ere we have a duke of York, which all this realm most desireth."

== Widowhood ==
Lady Rutland remained in close contact with her father after her marriage. He comforted her in 1543 when Lord Rutland died and helped her probate and perform his will. Upon her death in 1550, Lady Rutland was buried in St Mary the Virgin's Church, Bottesford.

== Issue ==
- Anne Manners, wife of Henry Neville, 5th Earl of Westmorland
- Gertrude Manners, wife of George Talbot, 6th Earl of Shrewsbury
- Henry Manners, 2nd Earl of Rutland
- Roger Manners (died 1607), a squire of the body to Elizabeth I, unmarried
- Elizabeth Manners (c. 1530 – 8 August 1570) married Sir John Savage of Rocksavage
- Oliver Manners
- Frances Manners, married Henry Nevill, 6th Baron Bergavenny; grandmother of Francis Fane, 1st Earl of Westmorland
- Sir Thomas Manners, grandfather of Thomas Vavasour, 1st Baronet
- Sir John Manners of Haddon Hall (c. 1534 – 4 June 1611), husband of Dorothy Vernon
- Isabel Manners, died young
- Katherine Manners, married Sir Henry Capell, Sheriff of Essex
