= Roger Manners (died 1607) =

English politician

Roger Manners (c. 1536 – 11 December 1607) was an English courtier and politician.

He was a son of Eleanor Manners, Countess of Rutland, and Thomas Manners, 1st Earl of Rutland.

As a child, Roger Manners received a legacy from a "Roger Ratlyf". He may have been named after this Roger Radcliffe. In a later letter Roger Manners mentioned Mary Radcliffe, a gentlewoman at Elizabeth's court, as a relation.

After St John's College and Corpus Christi Cambridge, Manners served in the navy and was aboard the New Bark at Portsmouth in May 1554. He took part in the burning of Le Conquet in 1558.

His home was Uffington, Lincolnshire. Manners was a Member (MP) of the Parliament of England for Grantham in 1563.

Manners was a "squire of the body" at the court of Mary I of England and Elizabeth I. He helped place his great-niece Lady Bridget Manners at court, and smooth things over when her marriage to Robert Tyrwhitt angered the queen.
