= Brede Pit and Cutting =

Coordinates: 50.936°N 0.605°E

- Site of Special Scientific Interest
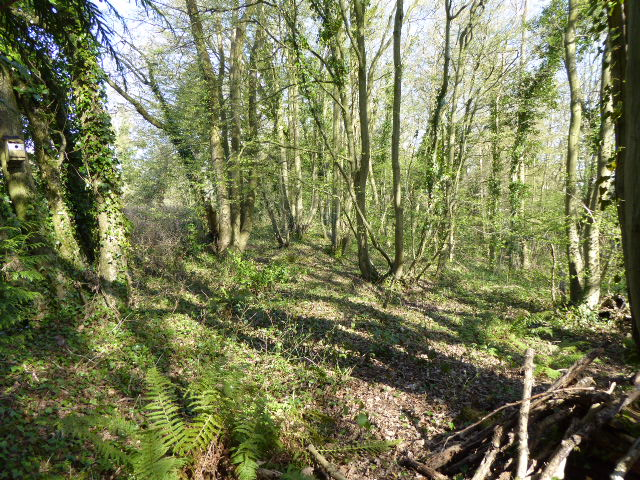
- Location of Brede Pit and Cutting.
- Area of search: East Sussex
- Grid reference: TQ 831 184
- Interest: Geological
- Area: 0.6 hectares (1.5 acres)
- Notification date: 1990
- Location map: Magic Map

Brede Pit and Cutting is a 0.6-hectare (1.5-acre) geological Site of Special Scientific Interest in Brede in East Sussex. It is a Geological Conservation Review site.

This site shows the junction between two formations in the Wealden Group, dating to the Early Cretaceous. It exposes the top 2 metres of the Ashdown Formation and the bottom 1.5 metres of the Wadhurst Clay Formation. The environments change from shallow fluvial to deeper lakes and lagoons and there are fossils of plants, fishes and reptiles.

The site is private land with no public access.
