= Lady Bridget Manners =

Lady Bridget Manners (21 February, 1572 - 10 July, 1604) was an English courtier, a maid of honour at the court of Elizabeth I.

She was the eldest daughter of John Manners, 4th Earl of Rutland (died 1588), and his wife Elizabeth Charlton.

== Court of Elizabeth I ==
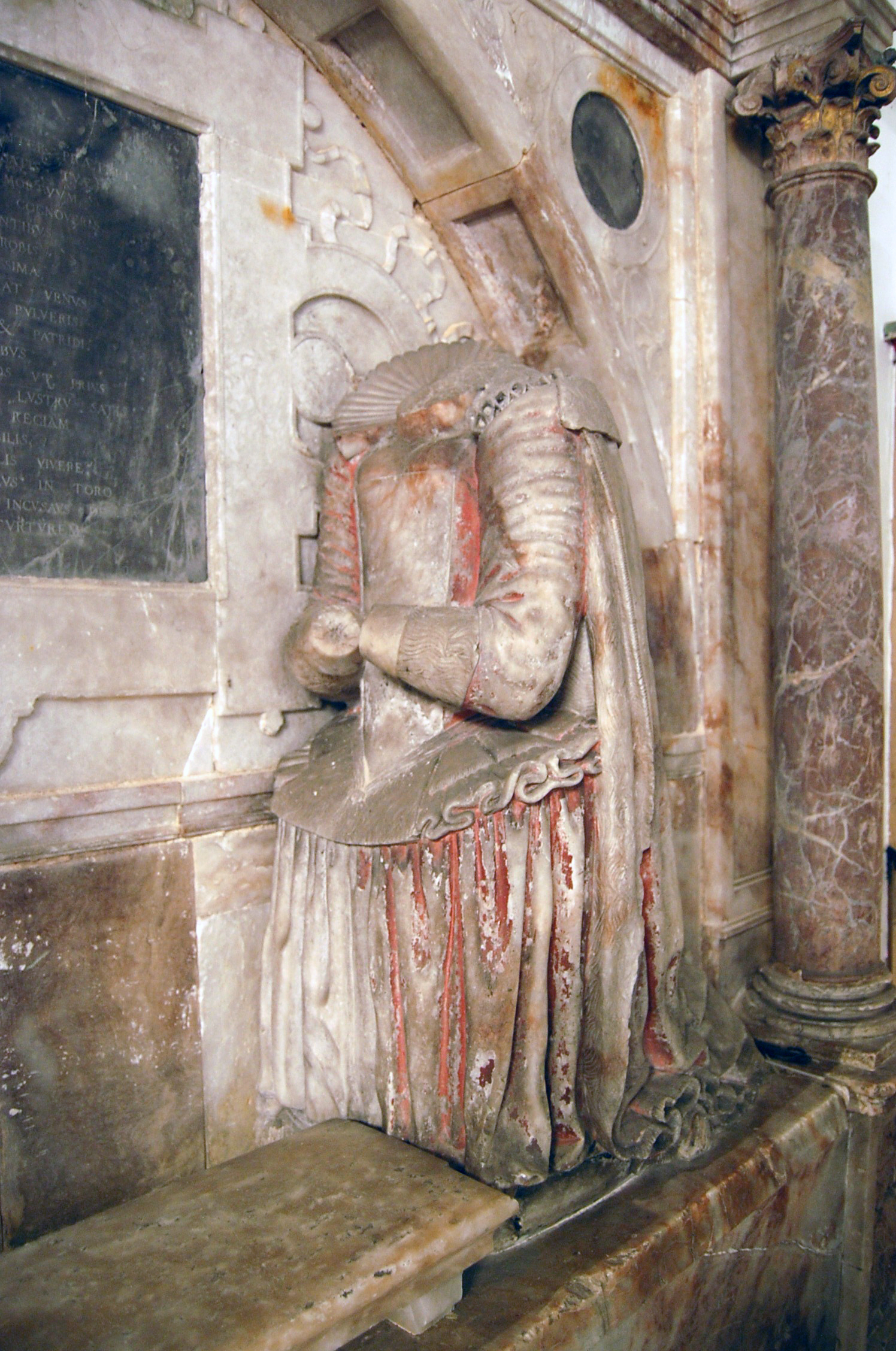
Detail of the Tyrwhitt monument at All Saint's, Bigby, Lincolnshire

Bridget entered the service of Elizabeth I in 1589 under the tutelage of Bridget Hussey, Countess of Bedford, and Lady Talbot. Her mother sent the Countess of Bedford £200 to dress her in suitable fashionable clothes for court. Her uncle, Roger Manners of Uffington, a "squire of the body" at court, made some of the arrangements for Bridget to join the royal household after her father's death. This Roger Manners wrote her a letter of advice on behaviour and decorum. Her brother, Roger Manners, who was now the Earl of Rutland, confirmed their uncle's "good advice". Another woman in the queen's household, who looked after the queen's jewels, Mary Radcliffe, was a relation. Bridget quickly became one of the Queen's favorites and eventually became responsible for her food as the Queen's carver.

In 1593 Barnabe Barnes included a sonnet to "the Beautiful Lady, the Lady Bridget Manners" in his Parthenophil and Parthenophe, as a rose in Cynthia's (Elizabeth's) crown;

Rose of the Garland! fairest and sweetest
Of all those sweet and fair flowers!
Pride of chaste Cynthia's rich crown!

In July 1594, her mother, Elizabeth, Countess of Rutland, wrote to Mary Radcliffe hoping that Bridget would be allowed leave from court to see her.

== Marriage ==
Manners married Robert Tyrwhitt, a son of William Tyrwhitt and Elizabeth Frescheville, secretly in August 1594. She had left court to recuperate from the measles.

Elizabeth was angry at Bridget's marriage and requested she come back to court. Lord Hunsdon wrote to Elizabeth, Countess of Rutland, in September wondering why Bridget had not returned to court at Greenwich, and said the Queen might "look further into that marriage than yet she hath done". Roger Manners of Uffington wrote, "her Majesty taketh it for a great offence, and so, as I hear, she mindeth to punish". Bridget went to stay in the country at a house of the Countess of Bedford. Robert Tyrwhitt was summoned to London. Roger Manners (of Uffington) wrote to Sir Robert Cecil and in favour of Tyrwhitt. He claimed that he himself had no advance knowledge of the marriage, and Bridget and his mother had ignored his advice for the last two years.

Tyrwhitt was jailed for circumventing the queen. Elizabeth interrupted her plans to travel to Belvoir Castle, the home of the Manners family. It took a cash settlement from Robert Manners, Earl of Rutland, to secure Tyrwhitt's release. The matter was settled by November 1594. In May 1597, she was in Cambridge. It was reported that the couple was happy but Tyrwhitt was in debt and had not fulfilled the agreed marriage settlement.

== Death ==
She died on 10 July 1604, possibly at Etchingham in Sussex, and is commemorated on a monument at Bigby which names her children as William, Robert, Rutland, and Bridget. Robert Tyrwhitt died in 1617. He came under suspicion after the Gunpowder Plot in 1605.
