= Brede, East Sussex =

Village and parish in East Sussex, England

Coordinates: 50.94°N 0.60°E

Brede
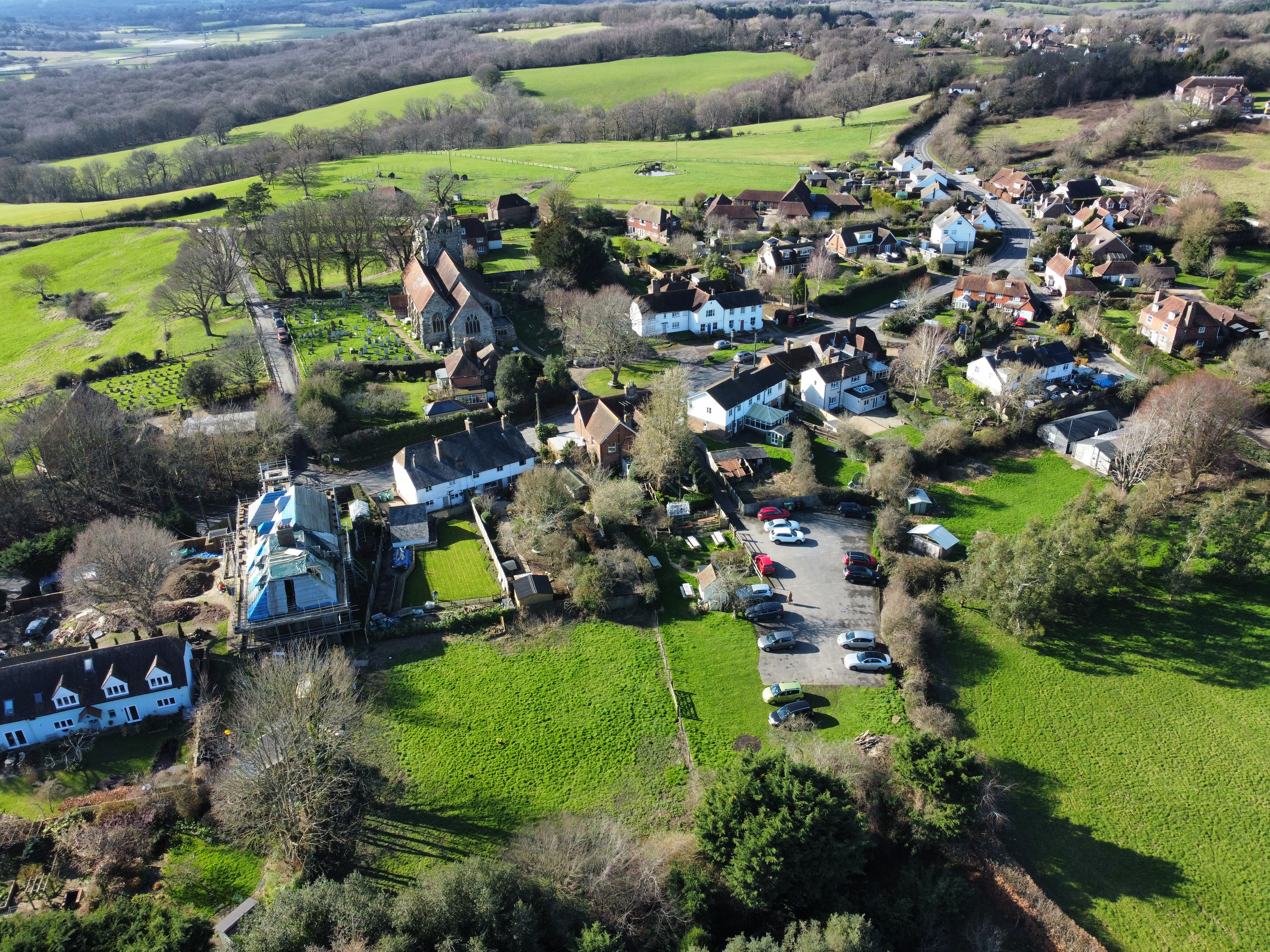
- Aerial view of Brede village

- Location within East Sussex
- Area: 17.6 km^{2} (6.8 sq mi)
- Population: 1,763 (Parish-2011)
  - Density: 252/sq mi (97/km^{2})
- OS grid reference: TQ825183
  - London: 50 miles (80 km) NW
- District: Rother
- Shire county: East Sussex
- Region: South East
- Country: England
- Sovereign state: United Kingdom
- Post town: RYE
- Postcode district: TN31
- Dialling code: 01424
- Police: Sussex
- Fire: East Sussex
- Ambulance: South East Coast
- UK Parliament: Bexhill and Battle

Brede is a village and civil parish in the Rother district of East Sussex, England. It is located eight miles (13 km) north of Hastings and four miles (6.4 km) west of Rye. It is located on the A28 road which runs from Hastings to Ashford and beyond.

== Features ==
The River Brede, which flows to the south of the settlement, takes its name from the village. The name is derived from the word for breadth in Old English, and refers to the wide valley which it overlooks.

The ecclesiastical parish is teamed with Udimore, Beckley and Peasmarsh; the four parish churches are St George, Brede, St Mary Udimore, All Saints, Beckley and St Peter and St Paul, Peasmarsh. The church of St George is a Grade I listed structure. The nave and north aisle date from the thirteenth century, while the chancel and south aisle are built in perpendicular style. It has a tower at the western end, and internally there are two monuments to the Oxenbridge family, dating from the late fifteenth and early sixteenth centuries. At the Western boundary of St George's Churchyard is the Grave of Damaris Richardson which is marked by a simple wooden cross. Nearby is Church House, an L-shaped building with one wing dating from the seventeenth century. It has two storeys and an attic, with a tiled roof. A second wing was added in the early nineteenth century, which has two storeys with a slate roof.

To the north of the church building is Church Cottage and the Old Post Office, which together form another L-shaped building. Church Cottage is a weatherboarded, timber-framed building dating from the fifteenth century, while the Old Post Office probably dates from the eighteenth century. To the south of the church is a new Rectory, next to the newer portion of graveyard.

The Village has a primary school, Methodist church and recreation ground. There are also two pubs; The Red Lion opposite St George's Church and The Broad Oak, which reopened in March 2019 after two years of closure, and threats to demolish the building for housing. It was previously known as The Rainbow Trout. A bus service connects the village to Northiam, Hastings and Rye.

The parish contains a Site of Special Scientific Interest (SSSI) – Brede Pit and Cutting. A cutting into the landscape has revealed a sequence of all known geological layers in the area. Fossilised remains in these sections provide key information for the study of palaeogeography, sedimentology and palaeoecology.

Avant-garde singer-songwriter Patrick Wolf recorded parts of his 2009 album The Bachelor using the church organ at St George's, Brede.

Florence Aylward (1862–1950), a composer known for her ballads, was the daughter of a Rector at Brede and was born at the Rectory.

== Governance ==
Brede is part of the electoral ward called Brede Valley. This ward stretches south to Westfield with a population taken at the 2011 census of 4,715.

== Brede Waterworks ==
To meet the growing demands for a drinking water supply to Hastings, trial boreholes were sunk in 1892, initially close to Brede Bridge, but then further to the west on the south side of the river. A continuous pumping test was conducted in 1896, and the boreholes were able to supply 1 million imperial gallons (4.5 megalitres) per day for six months, and so parliamentary approval was obtained for the scheme. However, landowners demanded high prices for their land, and extraction royalties for the water. Church Farm was located on the north bank of the river, and when it was offered for sale, Hastings Council bought it, assuming that water would be available beneath it.

Work commenced in 1899, to sink two wells on the farm, numbered 1 and 3, while well number 2 was to the south of the river, on land sold to them by Miss Brisco. The ground conditions were treacherous, but after 4 years, the two north bank wells had reached 275 feet (84 m) while the south bank well had reached 200 feet (61 m). Some 2,700 feet (820 m) of headings and adits to connect the wells together were also constructed. Unexpectedly, the soft ground meant that the wells had to be lined with concrete blocks, and the work cost £38,412, against the original estimate of £14,630.

Once the underground work was completed, buildings could be constructed. As there was no road access to the site, a 0.75-mile (1.21 km) tramway was constructed from the site to Brede Bridge. It was of 18 in (457 mm) gauge, and was worked by an 0-4-0 saddle tank manufactured by W. G. Bagnall together with four 4-ton waggons. A wharf was built just upstream from Brede Bridge, and a steam crane was used to unload materials from barges into the waggons.

In addition to the main pumping house, while held two 410-horsepower (310 kW) triple expansion steam engines, manufactured by Tangye Ltd, and the boiler house, mechanical filters, an aerator, an underground storage tank for treated water, and four cottages for employees were constructed on the site. Treated water was pumped to Fairlight, where the service reservoir was 515 feet (157 m) higher than the pumping station.

By 1922, the supply from the wells was inadequate, and was supplemented by water taken from the river. The situation was eased in 1928, when Hastings Council bought the Great Sanders Estate at Sedlescombe, and built a dam across the Powdermill Stream to create Powdermill Reservoir. Water from there flowed downhill to Brede Waterworks, and distance of about 1.5 miles (2.4 km), from where it was pumped onwards to Fairlight.

By 1928, navigation on the Brede was difficult, and could only be attempted on 2 days per fortnight. Use of barges ceased, and coal for the pumping engines was delivered by road to the tramway near Brede Bridge. By 1935, the locomotive was worn out, and was scrapped. A road was built so that coal lorries could deliver coal to the works. With demand for water still rising, work on the construction of Darwell Reservoir began in 1938, although it was not finished until 1951, due to delays caused by the Second World War. This supplied water to Brede pumps through a 6.5-mile (10.5 km) gravity aqueduct. Worthington-Simpson supplied a third triple-expansion pump in 1939–40, and the boilers for the engines were upgraded. The engines were used until 1964, when electric pumps replaced them. They were held in reserve, but one of the Tangye engines was scrapped in 1969, as its steam receiver had cracked.

The boilerhouse chimney, which was 99 feet (30 m) tall, was demolished in the early 1980s. The buildings were given a Grade II listing in 1987, as they were of Special Architectural Interest, and in 1994 the Brede Steam Engine Society was formed, to conserve and maintain the engines. The engines can be viewed by the public at regular open days, and a number of smaller engines and artefacts from the water industry have been assembled at the site.

== Notable people from Brede ==
- Florence Aylward (1862–1950), English composer known for ballads, born at Brede rectory
- Frederick Douglas Miller (1874–1961), English photographer born in Brede, who set up "The Mid-Sussex Photographic Studio"
- Goddard Oxenbridge (c.1478 – 1531), Knight of the Bath and the legendary Brede Giant.
- Elizabeth Tyrwhitt (c.1519 – 1578), writer, courtier.
- Clare Frewen Sheridan (1885–1970) writer and sculptor, cousin to Winston Churchill, lived at Brede Place, sculpted the Madonna and Child in St George's Church.
- Stephen Crane (1871–1900), American author, lived at Brede Place in the years preceding his death.
- Sam Draper (1998-), Australian rules footballer for the Essendon Football Club who grew up in Brede.

== Bibliography ==
- BSES (2000). Brede Waterworks (3rd ed.). Brede Steam Engine Society.
- Clarke, Brian (1995). Brede Waterworks Tramway. Brede Steam Engine Society.
- Eddison, Jill; Gardiner, Mark, eds. (1995). Romney Marsh: the Debatable Ground. Oxford University Committee for Archaeology (Monograph 41). ISBN 978-0-947816-41-4.
- Gardiner, Mark (1995). Medieval Farming and Flooding in the Brede Valley. Romney Marsh Trust. (Chapter 10 of Eddison & Gardiner 1995)
