= Robert Tyrwhitt (courtier) =

English courtier and politician

Sir Robert Tyrwhitt (by 1504 – 10 May 1572), was an English courtier and politician. He was the second son of Sir Robert Tyrwhitt and Maud Tailboys, and was brought up at court, becoming an Esquire of the Body. He acquired substantial landholdings and was knighted in 1543. In 1544, when Master of the Horse for Queen Catherine, he served on a military campaign in France, responsible for the transport of ordnance.

He was a Member (MP) of the Parliament of England for Lincolnshire in 1545 and for Huntingdonshire in April 1554 and 1559.

He was appointed High Sheriff of Lincolnshire for 1540–41 and High Sheriff of Cambridgeshire and Huntingdonshire for 1557–58. In 1548 he bought the manor of Leighton Bromswold, Huntingdonshire, which he made his home. He was also given custody of a house at Mortlake, Surrey, where he and his wife, a courtier herself, later took up residence.

He died at Leighton Bromswold on 10 May 1572. He had married twice: firstly Bridget, the daughter and heiress of Sir John Wiltshire of Stone Castle, Kent and widow of Sir Richard Wingfield of Kimbolton, Huntingdonshire and Sir Nicholas Harvey of Ickworth, Suffolk and secondly Elizabeth, the daughter of Sir Goddard Oxenbridge of Brede, Sussex.

== Other ==
He is sometimes confused or conflated with a nephew, Robert Tyrwhitt, MP, particularly as both men married women named Elizabeth Oxenbridge.
