= Robert Oxenbridge =

Robert Oxenbridge may refer to:

- Robert Oxenbridge (died 1574) (1508–1574), MP for Sussex and East Grinstead
- Sir Robert Oxenbridge (died 1616), English MP for Hampshire in 1604
- Sir Robert Oxenbridge (died 1638) (1595–1638), English MP for Whitchurch and Hampshire - son of above
