= Robert Tyrwhitt (MP died 1581) =

Member of the Parliament of England

Sir Robert Tyrwhitt

Member of Parliament for Lincolnshire

Personal details
- Born: c. 1510
- Died: November 16, 1581
- Spouse: Elizabeth Oxenbridge
- Children: Ursula Tyrwhitt

Sir Robert Tyrwhitt (died 1581), of Kettleby in Lincolnshire, was an English landowner, politician and administrator whose adherence to Roman Catholicism later led to imprisonment.

== Origins ==
He was the eldest son of Sir William Tyrwhitt (died 1541), of Scotter, MP and Sheriff of Lincolnshire, and his wife Isabel (died 1559), widow of Christopher Kelke and daughter of William Girlington, of Normanby. Among his brothers were two who also became MPs: Marmaduke Tyrwhitt and Tristram Tyrwhitt.

He is often confused with Sir Robert Tyrwhitt, his uncle, who not only had the same name and was also an MP but married a woman of the same name (his wife was the other Elizabeth's niece).

== Life ==
Apart from an initial career at the court of King Henry VIII under the tutelage of his uncle and three spells as an MP at Westminster, he spent his life managing his lands and taking part in the affairs of his county. His marriage to an heiress before 1531 brought him valuable estates and in 1548, his father having died in 1541, he inherited the lands of his grandfather Sir Robert. This made him a substantial landowner and public recognition followed.

He served as a justice of the peace for Lindsey from 1547, possibly until 1579, and was knighted by 1553. In the Parliaments of March 1553, April 1554 and that of 1558, he represented Lincolnshire. In May 1559 he was joint Lord Lieutenant of Lincolnshire and in the 1559-60 year was a High Sheriff of Lincolnshire.

With the re-imposition of Anglicanism under Queen Elizabeth I, his Roman Catholicism became a hindrance. Whether it was he or his uncle who led a force of 237 men against the Rising of the North in 1569 is unknown. In his later years, both he and his children were pursued by the authorities on account of their recusancy. He was in the Fleet Prison in 1580, being allowed the company of his wife and access to the gardens. When he died on 16 November 1581, two of his sons were let out of prison to attend his funeral.

He was buried at Bigby, Lincolnshire, in a tomb of white alabaster. His will, made five days before his death, left generous legacies to his wife, children, and grandchildren and his executors included two sons-in-law. The supervisors were William Cecil, 1st Baron Burghley, and Edward Manners, 3rd Earl of Rutland.

== Family ==
He married Elizabeth Oxenbridge, daughter and heiress of Sir Thomas Oxenbridge (died 1540), of Etchingham in Sussex, and his wife Elizabeth (died 1529), daughter of Sir George Puttenham and aunt of the writer George Puttenham. She was a niece of the same-named Elizabeth Oxenbridge who had married her husband's uncle. They are credited with 22 children, 9 sons and 13 daughters, among them:

William, his heir.
Marmaduke (died 1588), married Elizabeth, widow of Francis Gascoigne, of Gawthorpe (near Harewood), and daughter of Martin Aune, of Frickley.
Ursula, married Edmund Sheffield, 1st Earl of Mulgrave.
Margaret, married Sir Philip Constable, of Everingham, and was mother of Marmaduke Constable, father of the first of the Constable baronets.
Elizabeth, married William Fitzwilliam, of Mablethorpe, and was mother of Richard Fitzwilliam.
Frances, married the MP William Thorold.
