= The Monument of Matrones =

1582 anthology of English women's writing

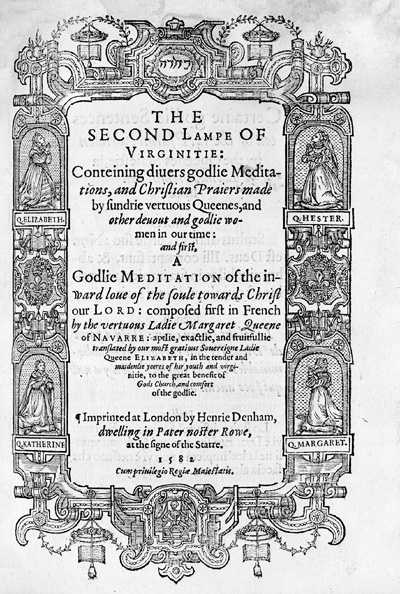
Title page to the "Second Lampe" of The Monument of Matrones, 1582.

The Monument of Matrones (1582) was the first published anthology of English women's writing. A compilation of prayers and meditations written largely by and for women published in London, its full title was The Monument of Matrones: Conteining Seven Severall Lamps of Virginitie, or Distinct Treatises; Whereof the First Five Concerne Praier and Meditation: the Other Two Last, Precepts and Examples. The Monument's seven "Lampes" or books make up 1500 quarto pages.

The Monument was compiled by Thomas Bentley, then a student of Gray's Inn, in a bid for royal patronage, and issued by the printer Henry Denham in 1582, just as the cult of Elizabeth I as the Virgin Queen was emerging. The desired patronage was not forthcoming, and Bentley became churchwarden of St Andrews Holborn with the support of John Aylmer, Bishop of London, in 1584.

Described in its Introduction as "diuers verie godlie, learned and diuine treatises, of meditationes and praier, made by sundrie right famous Queenes, noble Ladies, vertuous Virgins, and godlie Gentlewomen of al ages", Bentley's compilation provides virtuous examples and precepts for women, as well as prayers and devotional works. The second "Lampe" or treatise collects important works of Protestant female piety, including Marguerite of Navarre's Miroir de l'âme pécheresse, a mystical narrative of the soul as a yearning woman translated by Queen Elizabeth as the Mirror of the Sinful Soul, along with prayers and devotional works by Anne Askew; Frances Neville, Lady Bergavenny; Queen Catherine Parr; Lady Jane Grey; and Queen Elizabeth herself, to whom the work was dedicated.
