= Udimore =

Village and civil parish in East Sussex, England

Coordinates: 50.94°N 0.67°E

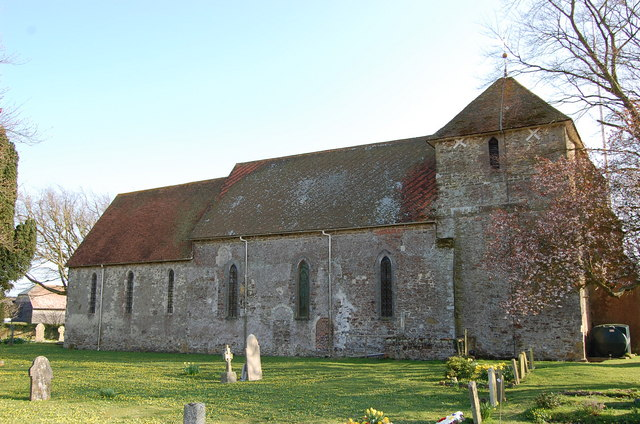

- Location within East Sussex
- Area: 11.7 km^{2} (4.5 sq mi)
- Population: 369 (Parish-2011)
  - Density: 81/sq mi (31/km^{2})
- OS grid reference: TQ872188
  - London: 52 miles (84 km) NW
- District: Rother
- Shire county: East Sussex
- Region: South East
- Country: England
- Sovereign state: United Kingdom
- Post town: RYE
- Postcode district: TN31
- Dialling code: 01797 and 01424
- Police: Sussex
- Fire: East Sussex
- Ambulance: South East Coast
- UK Parliament: Bexhill and Battle

Udimore /ˈjuːdɪmɔː/ is a village and civil parish in the Rother district of East Sussex, England. It is located five miles (8 km) west of Rye on the B2089 road to Brede.

The ecclesiastical parish is teamed with Brede; the two parish churches are St George, Brede and St Mary Udimore.

== Famous residents ==
The comedian, writer, musician, poet, playwright, soldier, and actor Spike Milligan lived on Dumb Woman's Lane in Udimore from 1988 until his death in 2002. The children's novelist Monica Edwards lived in Udimore from 1933 to 1936.

== Sports teams ==
Udimore Cricket Club play at Churchfields. They were formed in 1937. They currently play in Division 7 of the East Sussex Cricket League and are captained by Jim Adams. The club's leading run scorer is Barry Stunt (5022 to end of season 2014) and the leading wicket taker is Julian Buss (208 to end of season 2014)
