= Frances Manners, Baroness Bergavenny =

English noblewoman and author

Frances Neville
- Born: Frances Manners before 1540
- Died: c. September 1576
- Citizenship: Kingdom of England
- Spouse: Henry Nevill, 6th Baron Bergavenny (1556-)
- Relatives: Eleanor Paston, Countess of Rutland (Mother); Thomas Manners, 1st Earl of Rutland (Father)
- Writing career
- Genres: Christian literature Prose

Frances Neville, Baroness Bergavenny (also Nevill (née Manners; c. 1530—c. September 1576) was an English noblewoman and author. Little is known of either Lady or Lord Bergavenny, except that the latter was accused of behaving in a riotous and unclean manner by some Puritan commentators. Lady Bergavenny's work appeared in The Monument of Matrones in 1582 and was a series of "Praiers". Her devotions were sixty-seven prose prayers, one metrical prayer against vice, a long acrostic prayer on her daughter's name, and an acrostic prayer containing her own name.

== Family ==
Lady Frances Manners was the third daughter of Thomas Manners, 1st Earl of Rutland and his second wife, Eleanor Paston, Countess of Rutland. Her father was a soldier and the eldest son of George Manners, 11th Baron de Ros and his wife, Anne St Leger. By St Leger, Lady Frances was a great-granddaughter of Anne of York; the oldest sister of Edward IV and Richard III.

Before 1554, Lady Frances had married Henry Nevill, 6th Baron Bergavenny. Lord Bergavenny was born between 1527 and 1535. He was the son of George Nevill, 5th Baron Bergavenny and Lady Mary Stafford. Neville succeeded to the title of Baron Bergavenny after his father's death in 1535. He held office of Chief Larderer at the coronation of Queen Mary in 1553. When Lady Bergavenny died in 1576, Lord Bergavenny remarried to Elizabeth Darrell, daughter of Stephen Darrell and Philippe Weldon, before 1586; they had no issue. He died 10 February 1586/87 without male issue. He was buried on 21 March 1586/87 at Birling, Kent, England.

Lady Bergavenny died circa September 1576 and was buried at Birling, Kent, England.

== Children ==
Lord and Lady Bergavenny had one daughter Mary Neville, Baroness Le Despenser (25 March 1554 – 28 June 1626). Mary gained the title of suo jure 3rd Baroness le Despenser. She had claimed the succession to the Barony of Bergavenny, but this was settled on her cousin, Edward Nevill.

The first, second, and fourth creations of Baron le Despenser had been under attainder from 1400 upon the death of Mary's ancestor, Thomas le Despencer, 2nd Baron le Despencer (1373–1400) and became abeyant as well in 1449 after the death of the infant Lady Anne Beauchamp. The representation of the three Baronies of le Despencer fell into abeyance between Anne's cousin George Nevill, 4th Baron Bergavenny and aunt, Anne de Beauchamp, 16th Countess of Warwick. On the attainder and execution of Margaret Pole, Countess of Salisbury on 28 May 1541 any claim to the three Baronies by the descendants of the 16th Countess of Warwick, lapsed and the sole representation lay with the Barons of Bergavenny. The attainder of Thomas, 2nd Baron le Despenser, was reversed in 1461 but the abeyancies continued until 25 May 1604, when the abeyancy of the 1295 Barony of le Despencer was terminated in favor of Mary Nevill. Mary married Sir Thomas Fane, son of George Fane, on 12 December 1574. They were parents to Francis Fane, 1st Earl of Westmorland. Mary, Lady Despenser, died on 28 June 1626 at age 72.

== Works ==
Her Praiers in prose and verse were later published in 1582, in the Second Lamp of Thomas Bentley's anthology of Protestant women writer's prayers, The Monument of Matrones. In a deathbed dedication of her work to her daughter, she calls it a "jewell of health for the soule, and a perfect path to paradise." Her collection includes sixty-seven pages of prose prayers for private use and public worship linked to various occasions and times of day; a five-page acrostic prayer based on her daughter Mary Fane’s name, and a concluding prayer based on her own name.
