= Elizabeth Tyrwhitt =

English writer and courtier (died 1578)

Elizabeth Tyrwhitt (died 1578), was an English gentlewoman, courtier, and writer.

== Biography ==
Born in her father's house at Brede, she was one of five children of Sir Goddard Oxenbridge (died 1531) and his second wife Anne (died 1531), widow of John Windsor and daughter of Sir Thomas Fiennes, of Claverham in Arlington (a son of Sir Richard Fiennes).

Accepted into the court of King Henry VIII, by 1537 she was a gentlewoman of the privy chamber and shortly after was married to a fellow-courtier, married Sir Robert Tyrwhitt. She served in the households of Queen Jane Seymour and Queen Katherine Howard.

In August 1540 Tyrwhitt and others ladies of the court visited Portsmouth to see a newly built ship. They sent Henry VIII a joint letter which was signed by Mabel, Lady Southampton, Margaret Tallebois (or Tailboys), Margaret Howard (sister of Katherine Howard), Alice Browne, Anne Knyvett (daughter of Thomas Knyvett), Jane Denny, Jane Meutas, Anne Bassett, Elizabeth Tyrwhitt, and Elizabeth Harvey.

Tyrwhitt became a lady-in-waiting and a close friend to Queen Katherine Parr. The two were related by marriage and shared Protestant sympathies. However, suspected of links to the executed Anne Askew, with other members of Katherine's household in 1546 she was arrested by the King. After his death, she remained in service with Katherine and her fourth husband, Thomas Seymour, being at the bedside when Katherine died in 1549.

In the scandal which followed over Seymour's relationship with the future Queen Elizabeth I of England, she gave evidence over possibly inappropriate behaviour and was briefly placed in charge of the princess in place of the suspect Katherine Astley.

Thereafter, she lived a private life, dying at her home in Clerkenwell. Her will was proved on 28 April 1578 and she was buried in the church of St Mary the Virgin at Leighton Bromswold, where her effigy may be seen together with those of her husband and daughter.

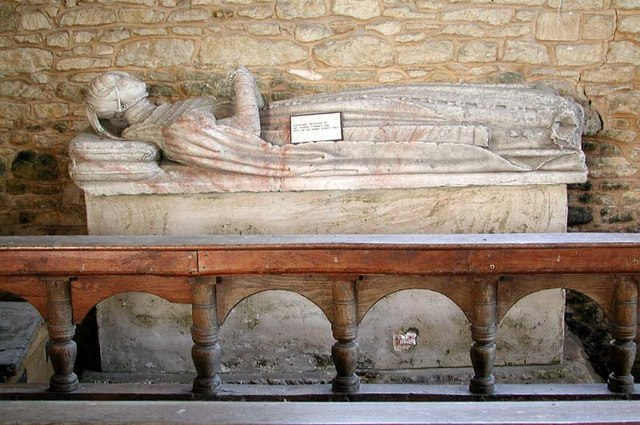
Tomb in St Mary the Virgin, Leighton Bromswold

== Writings ==
She composed a work called Morning and Evening Praiers, with Divers Psalmes Himnes and Meditations, published in 1574. A copy now in the British Library had belonged to Queen Elizabeth I and includes prayers written by Katherine Parr.

== Family ==
Between March 1538 and August 1539 she married, as his second wife, the courtier Sir Robert Tyrwhitt (died 1572), of Leighton Bromswold. (Her niece Elizabeth Oxenbridge, daughter of her half-brother Thomas, had previously married her husband's nephew, Sir Robert Tyrwhitt). They had one daughter Catherine (died 1567), who married Sir Henry Darcy of Brimham in Yorkshire.
