= Bigby, Lincolnshire =

Village and civil parish in the West Lindsey district of Lincolnshire, England

Coordinates: 53.552080°N 0.402229°W

Bigby
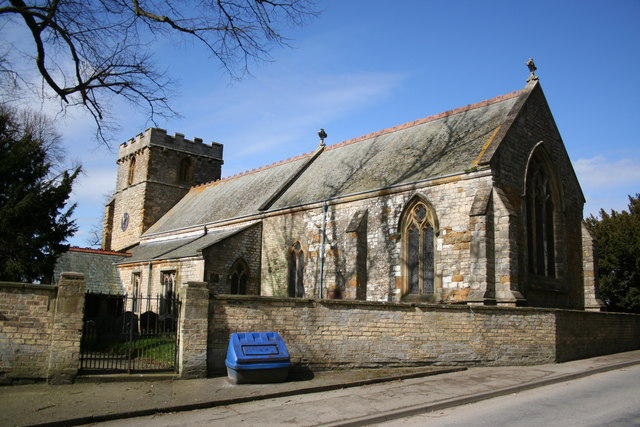
- All Saints' church, Bigby

- Location within Lincolnshire
- Population: 347 (2011)
- OS grid reference: TA059073
  - London: 140 mi (230 km) S
- District: West Lindsey
- Shire county: Lincolnshire
- Region: East Midlands
- Country: England
- Sovereign state: United Kingdom
- Post town: Barnetby
- Postcode district: DN38
- Police: Lincolnshire
- Fire: Lincolnshire
- Ambulance: East Midlands
- UK Parliament: Gainsborough

Bigby is a village and civil parish in the West Lindsey district of Lincolnshire, England.

The village is situated about 10 miles (20 km) south from the Humber Bridge, and 4 miles (6 km) east from the town of Brigg. The village lies in the Lincolnshire Wolds, a designated Area of Outstanding Natural Beauty and close to the administrative border with North Lincolnshire. The hamlets of Kettleby and Kettleby Thorpe lie within the parish, and that of Somerby almost immediately to the south.

According to the 2001 census Bigby had a population of 234, increasing to 347 at the 2011 census.

== History ==
The name Bigby comes from an Old Norse personal name 'Bekki' + Old Norse 'býr', meaning "settlement" or "farmstead". Bigby is recorded in the Domesday account as "Bechebi", with the Lord of the manor as William son of Nigel.

The local Anglican parish church is a Grade I listed building dedicated to All Saints. It dates from the 12th century, with later additions and restorations in 1779 and 1878. On the north side of the chancel is a large alabaster tomb to Sir Robert Tyrwhit of Kettleby hamlet, who died in 1581, and his wife. To the east is a monument to Sir Robert Tyrwhit of Kettleby, who died in 1617, and Lady Bridget Manners his wife who died in 1604. Bigby is one of four Thankful Villages in Lincolnshire, because it lost no men in the First World War. There is a war memorial in the parish churchyard in remembrance of a local man and his comrade shot down during the Second World War. The village is featured on Darren Hayman's album, Thankful Villages Volume 3.

Pingley Farm, or Camp 81, was the site of a Second World War Prisoner-of-war camp. Purpose-built to house 750 low-risk Italian prisoners, by May 1946 Pingley camp held 984. The camp has been demolished as of January 2009, and the site redeveloped as housing. The area is being developed with ten luxury executive houses. The first was started in July 2010.

== Kettleby ==
The hamlet of Kettleby (sometimes spelled Kettelby) lies about 1.5 miles (2.4 km) west of Bigby village. The deserted medieval village (DMV) of Kettleby was first recorded in a will of 1066. Domesday records two manors: Kettleby, whose Lord of the Manor was Ralph, nephew of Geoffrey Alselin, and Kettleby Thorpe, whose Lord was listed only as Gilbert. Thereafter Kettleby merged with Kettleby Thorpe, also a deserted settlement. Kettleby is mentioned in 1334. Today the area is occupied by the earthworks of Kettleby Hall. Kettleby Hall was reputedly a moated hunting lodge built in the reign of James I and later the chief seat of the Tyrwhitt family. The last male heir sold-up in 1648 because of debts, and the building was demolished in 1696–97. The present farmhouse on the site dates from the nineteenth century.
