= Etchingham =

Village and parish in East Sussex, England

Coordinates: 51.00°N 0.43°E

- Location within East Sussex
- Area: 13.4 km^{2} (5.2 sq mi)
- Population: 864 (2019)
  - Density: 145/sq mi (56/km^{2})
- OS grid reference: TQ709260
  - London: 42 miles (68 km) NW
- Civil parish: Etchingham
- District: Rother
- Shire county: East Sussex
- Region: South East
- Country: England
- Sovereign state: United Kingdom
- Post town: ETCHINGHAM
- Postcode district: TN19
- Dialling code: 01580
- Police: Sussex
- Fire: East Sussex
- Ambulance: South East Coast
- UK Parliament: Bexhill and Battle
- Website: Etchingham Parish Council

Etchingham is a village and civil parish in the Rother district of East Sussex in southern England. The village is located approximately 15 miles (24 km) southeast of Royal Tunbridge Wells in Kent and 13 miles (21 km) northwest of Hastings, on the A265, half a mile west of its junction with the A21.

The most notable landmarks in Etchingham include the Etchingham railway station, the Etchingham CofE primary school and its local amenities, such as a post office and butchers. Etchingham railway station is on the Hastings Line to London Charing Cross and Cannon Street.

== History ==
Long before the Norman Conquest of 1066, Etchingham was a moated manor house; after this time the manor was taken over by the Normans. In 1166 it was left to the de Achyngham (Etchingham) family, who were well-known landowners of the time. The Etchingham family papers record that William was so pleased with the right-hand man that he gave him the land now known as Etchingham.

The manor, long since demolished, stood at the point now occupied by the London to Hastings railway line. Some of the stone from the manor was likely used in the construction of the station buildings. Legend of a great bell that lay at the bottom of the moat surrounding the church and manor is frequently recounted amongst locals and that it would never be seen until six yokes of white oxen were brought to drag it up. However centuries have passed by, the moat is long gone and no bell has surfaced. The 14th-century church was originally built within the grounds of the manor; evidence of the moat can still be seen.

=== Etymology ===
The name Etchingham is probably derived from Old English, and roughly translates as "The homestead or enclosure of family and followers of a man called Ecchi". In a place name, "inga" usually refers to 'people of' or 'dwellers at', and 'ham' to a homestead or settlement.

A second possible derivation of the name is that it could come from the Anglo-Saxon "ecen", meaning great and "ham" (homestead), but the former explanation is the more likely.

=== Churches ===
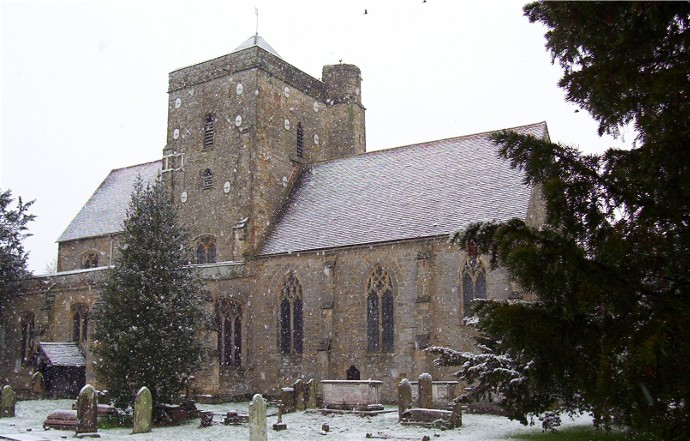
The parish church in the snow

The 14th-century parish church is dedicated to The Assumption of Blessed Mary and St Nicholas. On its spire is what is probably England's oldest brass weather vane. It also has the second-largest series of misericords in the county; one depicts a fox preaching to geese. A Memorial brass to Agnes Oxenbridge and Elizabeth Etchingham is visible on the floor of the side aisle.

There was formerly a Wesleyan (Methodist) Church on the High Street: built in 1902, it closed in 1970 and is now a private residence.

=== Village sign ===
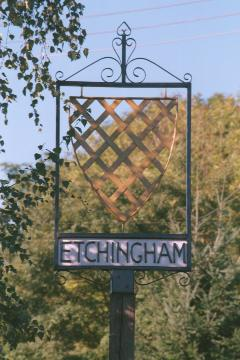
Etchingham village sign

The design of the village sign is based on the de Etchingham family coat of arms. A similar design is used for the parish council logo, the primary school badge and the church weathervane.

== Notable residents ==
Among the famous former residents of Etchingham is the regicide James Temple, who lived at Haremere Hall in the 1620s. He was a judge at the trial of Charles I and signed the execution warrant.

Haremere was later owned by the second Sir John Lade, a notorious gambler and close friend of the Prince Regent. He was a notable whip. His wife, Letty, had been the mistress of a highwayman before becoming a mistress of the Duke of York. She too was a notable horsewoman and whip and was painted by Stubbs. Sir John ran through the family fortune and ended his life as a coachman.

Another famous resident, the novelist and critic Anthony Burgess, lived in a semi-detached house called Applegarth on the south side of the A265 road (west of the High Street). His house can be distinguished by the presence of a small statue of a Siamese cat next to the building (he and his first wife Lynne were cat-lovers). The uncorrected proofs of his novel Tremor of Intent state that it was written in Etchingham between 20 June and 30 August 1965.

The folk musicians Ashley Hutchings and Shirley Collins lived there in the 1970s and formed the Etchingham Steam Band in 1974.

In July 2020, the journalist and former editor of The Daily Telegraph, Charles Moore, was given a life peerage under the government of then Prime Minister Boris Johnson. Having been born 13 miles away in Hastings, Moore chose Etchingham as the seat of his barony.

== Village hall and organisations ==
The village had an old village hall, that closed in 2014 and was subsequently demolished.

The new Village Halls are two halls at the new community complex at Parsonage Croft. One is shared between the school and the community, and the other serving the community.

The shared hall is known as the Ahrens Hall and the smaller hall is the Parker Hall which serves as the meeting place for the Toddlers' Group.

Other groups in the village include The Pickleball Club, Brownies and a Darby and Joan Club.

A Social Club exists that serves as the base for the village branch of the Royal British Legion and the clubhouse for the Etchingham & Fontridge Cricket Club.

== Philatelic connections ==
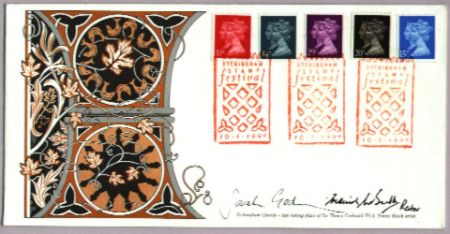
Commemorative cover produced by Etchingham PCC, to mark the 150th anniversary of the Penny Black, signed by Sarah Godwin and Father Butler, the Rector at the time

Henry Corbould FSA, the designer of the first postage stamp, the Penny Black, died at Hurst Green, having been taken ill there while travelling back to London from the coast, and was buried in Etchingham parish church. There is a memorial tablet on the wall of the church, which for many years was believed to be the only known likeness of Corbould.

In 1990, as part of the 150th anniversary of the postage stamp, the village produced two First Day Covers to mark the Corbould connection, and held the Etchingham Stamp Festival to raise funds for church repairs. The festival was held over the weekend following the issue of the Miniature Sheet in May, in the church and village hall.

The design on the cover is based on architectural detail in the church; the pictorial handstamp for the Etchingham Stamp Festival is based on the church weathervane. One cover was issued in January with the full set of the 'double headed' commemorative stamps and another for the miniature sheet issued in May, both covers bearing special handstamps featuring a detail from the church weathervane. Both covers were limited editions. Sarah Godwin, the designer of the 1987 Isaac Newton stamps, designed the cover, her family home being in Etchingham.

== Village shop ==
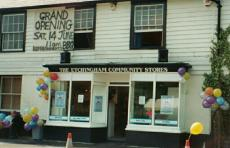
Opening day of the Community Stores

The first village shop, "The Etchingham Stores", was built when the South Eastern Railway reached Robertsbridge c. 1860. In the early days of the telephone's arrival in the village, it also housed Etchingham's first telephone exchange. Along with several other properties in the village, the premises suffered flooding in October 2000; the then owners decided not to re-open the shop.

Many village residents were unhappy about the loss of the village shop. After meetings, many hours of negotiations and fundraising, sufficient funds were raised to purchase the premises. Village residents purchased shares in the newly formed Etchingham Community Shop Association Ltd. The shop was ready for opening on 14 June 2003, when a large crowd gathered outside the shop, bringing traffic to a standstill.

The Shop & Deli ceased trading in 2017 as it was no longer considered viable to run a grocer out of the premises. The building is now leased to two local businesses.

== Cricket ==
The newly formed team after their first match

Etchingham had an active cricket team in 1939, the Etchingham & Fontridge Cricket Club, but the start of World War II brought play to an abrupt end. After the war, the cricket field was not brought back into use. In early 2006, a group of enthusiasts decided to revive the tradition. The new club has in its possession several artefacts, minutes of meetings and games dating back to the 1920s when the club was known as the "Etchingham & Fontridge Cricket Club". Keen to maintain a link with the original club, the new club uses the same name.

The original club was formed by Mr W. F. Foster, who later became its president. A pavilion was erected in 1920, and as the number of playing members increased, a 2nd eleven was formed. Records show that Colonel Hornblower was elected chairman in 1934, with Mr H. H. Howard as Secretary. By 1934 Mr J. Gorwyn had become Captain of the 1st team.

The newly reinstated club uses the previous club name to maintain a link with tradition. It is pleased that Lionel Dengate, who was secretary to the club in the 1930s agreed to serve as Honorary Club President.

The club does not yet have a suitable cricket field in the village, so for the time being all matches have to be away fixtures.

== Sources ==
- Etchingham, Past and Present, published by the Hurst Green Historical Society, 1994
- ESCIS (East Sussex Community Information Service)
- Etchingham Parish Church Guide (1983, revised 1994), compiled by Ilse M. Baker BA
- Hidden Sussex & People of Hidden Sussex, Warden Swinfen & David Arscott
- Saul, Nigel (1986). Scenes from Provincial Life: Knightly Families in Sussex, 1280–1400. Clarendon Press. pp. 140–60. ISBN 9780198200772.
