= Saint-Léger =

Saint Leger or Saint-Léger (French pronunciation: [sɛ̃ leʒe]) may refer to:

== People ==
- Leodegar (615–679), martyred Burgundian Bishop of Autun
- Saint-Léger Didot (1767–1828), French papermaker
- St. Leger family, an Anglo-Irish family
- Anne St Leger (1476–1526), Baroness de Ros, niece of Edward IV and Richard III
- Anthony St Leger (British Army officer) (1731–1786/32–1786), Member of Parliament
- Anthony St Leger (Lord Deputy of Ireland) (1496–1559), English politician and Lord Deputy of Ireland
- Anthony St Leger (Master of the Rolls) (died 1613), English-born judge
- Barry St. Leger (1733–1789), British army officer
- Barthélemy Mercier de Saint-Léger (1734–1799), French abbot and librarian
- The Honorable Elizabeth Aldworth, born the Hon. Elizabeth St Leger, first Irish woman to be initiated as a Freemason
- Francis Saint-Léger (born 1957), member of the National Assembly of France
- Frank St. Leger (1890–1969), British-American symphony conductor of Indian birth
- Frederick York St Leger (1833–1901), South African newspaperman and Anglican rector
- Garry St. Leger (born 1985), American judoka
- John St. Leger (died 1596), English Member of Parliament
- Nicholas St. Leger (died 1589), English politician
- Raymond St. Leger (born 1957), American mycologist, entomologist and molecular biologist
- Sean St Ledger (born 1984), English footballer
- St Leger St Leger, 1st Viscount Doneraile (died 1787), Irish Member of Parliament for Doneraile
- Thomas St. Leger (died 1483), English civil servant and rebel
- Warham St Leger (1525–1597), English soldier
- Will St Leger (born 1972), Irish street artist
- William St Leger (1586–1642), Anglo-Irish landowner, official and soldier

== Places ==
=== Belgium ===
- Saint-Léger, Belgium, in Luxembourg province
- Saint-Léger, Estaimpuis, in Hainaut

=== France ===
- Saint-Léger, Alpes-Maritimes, in the Alpes-Maritimes department
- Saint-Léger, Charente, in the Charente department
- Saint-Léger, Charente-Maritime, in the Charente-Maritime department
- Saint-Léger, Lot-et-Garonne, in the Lot-et-Garonne department
- Saint-Léger, Mayenne, in the Mayenne department
- Saint-Léger, Pas-de-Calais, in the Pas-de-Calais department
- Saint-Léger, Savoie, in the Savoie department
- Saint-Léger, Seine-et-Marne, in the Seine-et-Marne department
- Saint-Léger, former commune in the Manche department, now part of Saint-Jean-des-Champs
- Saint-Léger-aux-Bois, Oise, in the Oise department
- Saint-Léger-aux-Bois, Seine-Maritime, in the Seine-Maritime department
- Saint-Léger-Bridereix, in the Creuse department
- Saint-Léger-de-Balson, in the Gironde department
- Saint-Léger-de-Fougeret, in the Nièvre department
- Saint-Léger-de-la-Martinière, in the Deux-Sèvres department
- Saint-Léger-de-Montbrillais, in the Vienne department
- Saint-Léger-de-Montbrun, in the Deux-Sèvres department
- Saint-Léger-de-Peyre, in the Lozère department
- Saint-Léger-de-Rôtes, in the Eure department
- Saint-Léger-des-Aubées, in the Eure-et-Loir department
- Saint-Léger-des-Bois, in the Maine-et-Loire department
- Saint-Léger-des-Prés, in the Ille-et-Vilaine department
- Saint-Léger-des-Vignes, in the Nièvre department
- Saint-Léger-du-Bois, in the Saône-et-Loire department
- Saint-Léger-Dubosq, in the Calvados department
- Saint-Léger-du-Bourg-Denis, in the Seine-Maritime department
- Saint-Léger-du-Gennetey, in the Eure department
- Saint-Léger-du-Malzieu, in the Lozère department
- Saint-Léger-du-Ventoux, in the Vaucluse department
- Saint-Léger-en-Bray, in the Oise department
- Saint-Léger-en-Yvelines, in the Yvelines department
- Saint-Léger-la-Montagne, in the Haute-Vienne department
- Saint-Léger-le-Guérétois, in the Creuse department
- Saint-Léger-le-Petit, in the Cher department
- Saint-Léger-lès-Authie, in the Somme department
- Saint-Léger-lès-Domart, in the Somme department
- Saint-Léger-les-Mélèzes, in the Hautes-Alpes department
- Saint-Léger-lès-Paray, in the Saône-et-Loire department
- Saint-Léger-les-Vignes, in the Loire department
- Saint-Léger-Magnazeix, in the Haute-Vienne department
- Saint-Léger-près-Troyes, in the Aube department
- Saint-Léger-sous-Beuvray, in the Saône-et-Loire department
- Saint-Léger-sous-Brienne, in the Aube department
- Saint-Léger-sous-Cholet, in the Maine-et-Loire department
- Saint-Léger-sous-la-Bussière, in the Saône-et-Loire department
- Saint-Léger-sous-Margerie, in the Aube department
- Saint-Léger-sur-Bresle, in the Somme department
- Saint-Léger-sur-Dheune, in the Saône-et-Loire department
- Saint-Léger-sur-Roanne, in the Loire department
- Saint-Léger-sur-Sarthe, in the Orne department
- Saint-Léger-sur-Vouzance, in the Allier department
- Saint-Léger-Triey, in the Côte-d'Or department
- Saint-Léger-Vauban, in the Yonne department

=== Switzerland ===
- Saint-Légier-La Chiésaz, a municipality in the district of Riviera-Pays-d'Enhaut in the canton of Vaud

== Greyhound racing ==
- St Leger (English greyhound race), a competition held at Perry Barr Stadium
- St Leger (Irish greyhound race), a competition held at Limerick Greyhound Stadium
- Yorkshire St Leger, a British greyhound race

== Horse racing ==
- American St. Leger Stakes, an American horse race
- Deutsches St. Leger, a German horse race
- Great Northern St. Leger, a New Zealand horse race
- Irish St. Leger, an Irish horse race
- New Zealand St. Leger, a New Zealand horse race
- St Leger Stakes, a British horse race
- St. Leger Italiano, an Italian horse race
- VRC St Leger, an Australian horse race
