= St Leger family =

Coat of arms of one branch of the family: Azure fretty argent, a chief or

The St. Leger family is an old Anglo-Irish family with Norman roots. The surname is written and pronounced in several way including Sallinger or Sallenger (/ˈsɛlɪndʒər/ SEL-in-jər). The oldest French and English records of the family use the Latin form Latin: de Sancto Leodegario.

== St. Legers in history ==
The English family took its name from Saint-Léger-aux-Bois, in the modern French département of Seine Maritime, and they were tenants of the Counts of Eu in both France and England. The first clear use of the surname in England is in the 1086 Domesday Book entry for Bexhill-on-Sea, near Hastings in Sussex, which lists Robert St. Leger as one of the tenants there under Robert, Count of Eu, lord of Hastings. This Robert was probably also holding Fairlight. It has also been suggested that another Domesday Book ancestor of the family is William, mentioned without surname, who held Cortesley (between Bexhill and Hastings), and Wartling under the count of Eu, both of which were later lordships of a St. Leger family, who also held Fairlight. The later St. Leger family of Ulcombe in Kent, also tenants of the counts of Eu, are generally believed to be relatives of the St. Leger family of Wartling and Fairlight.

St. Legers of notable historical interest include:

- Bishop Thomas St. Leger 1240–1320 was the Archdeacon of Kells.
- In 1377, Thomas St. Leger, resided at Otterden in Kent, and also became the owner of East Hall Manor in Murston.
- Sir Thomas Saint Leger (1440-1483) was a Knight of the Bath and Ambassador to France. He married Anne of York, Duchess of Exeter. Upon Edward IV of England's death in 1483, St. Leger was beheaded by Richard III of England.
- John St. Leger (died 1441) of Ulcombe was Sheriff of Kent in 1430.
- Anthony St Leger (Lord Deputy of Ireland) (1496–1559), served as Lord Deputy in Ireland.
- Anthony St Leger (Master of the Rolls) (c. 1535–1613), English-born judge and Master of the Rolls in Ireland.
- Sir William St. Leger, President of the province of Munster in Ireland (1586–1642)
- Sir John St Leger (1674-1743), judge of the Court of Exchequer (Ireland), father of Generals Anthony and Barry St Leger
- Anthony St Leger (British Army officer) (1731–1786), Member of Parliament for Grimsby and Governor of St Lucia.
- Colonel Barry St. Leger, British colonel involved in the American Revolutionary War (1737–1789); he was Anthony's brother
- St Leger St Leger, 1st Viscount Doneraile (d. 1787) Irish Member of Parliament for Doneraile
- Frederick York St Leger, founder of the Cape Times.
- Colonel Stratford Edward St Leger DSO CMG, Anglo-Boer War diarist and artist, World War I (1867–1935)
- The Hon. Elizabeth Aldworth, born Elizabeth St Leger, the first female Irish Freemason
- Raymond St. Leger, entomologist, mycologist and college professor (born 1957).
- Sean St Ledger, Central Defender for Leicester City.
- Will St Leger, street artist and activist in Ireland

== Sources ==
- Moya Frenz St. Leger, St. Leger The Family and the Race, 1986 ISBN 0-85033-588-4, reprinted in 2004
