= Ralph St Leger =

Sheriff of Kent

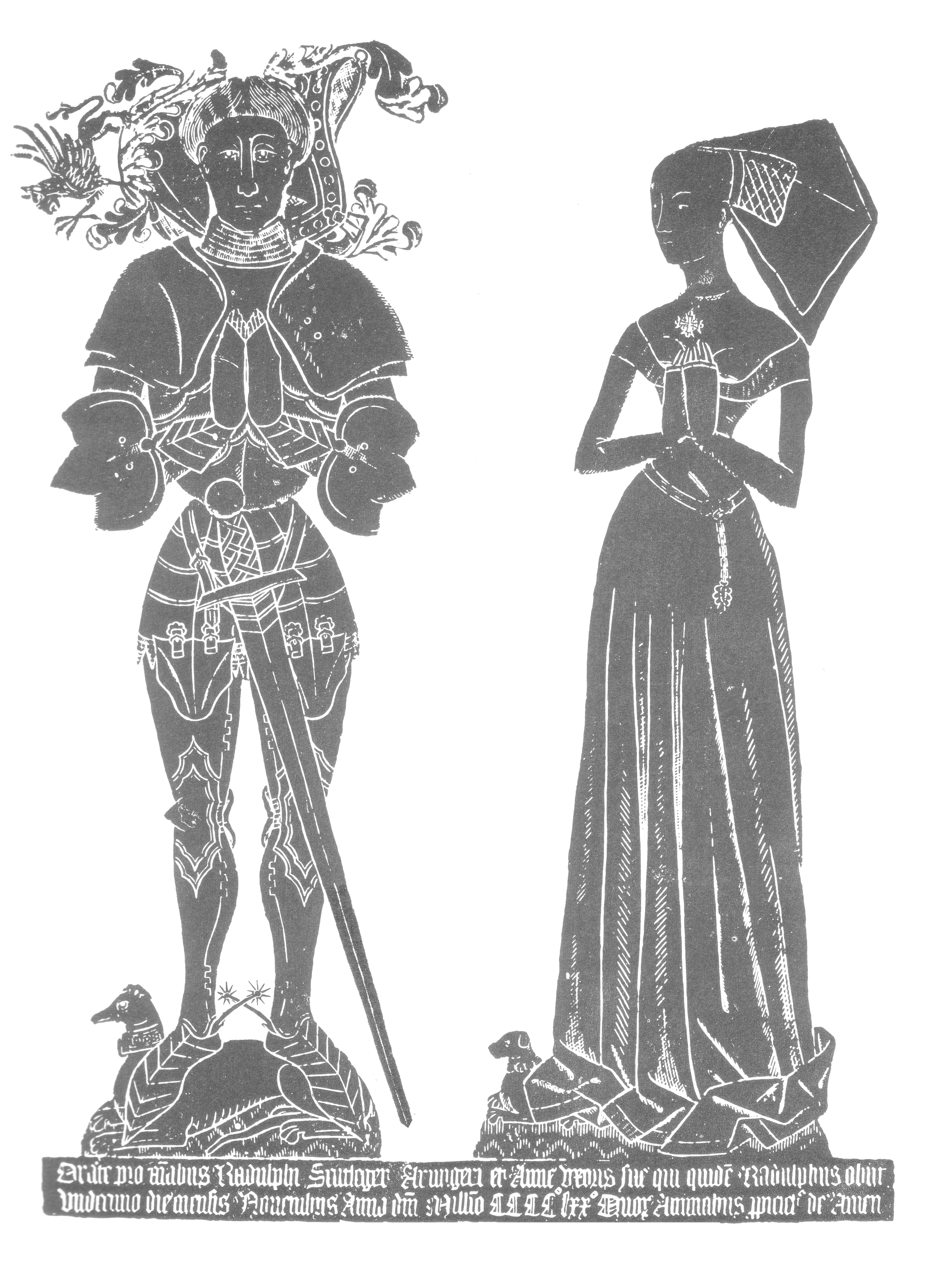
Monumental brass in Ulcombe Church, Kent, to Ralph St Leger (died 1470) and his wife "Anne"

Arms of St Leger: Azure fretty argent, a chief or

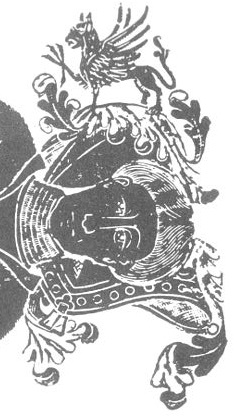
Crest atop helm of Ralph St Leger, showing a griffin passant. Detail from his monumental brass, Ulcombe Church

Ralph St Leger (died 1470) (alias Randolf, etc.) of Ulcombe in Kent was Sheriff of Kent in 1467/8 and was constable of Leeds Castle in Kent. He was a member of the St Leger family.

== Family ==
He was the eldest son and heir of Sir John St Leger (c. 1404 – 1441) of Ulcombe, Sheriff of Kent in 1430 by his wife Margery Donet, daughter and heiress of James Donet (died 1409) of Silham in the parish of Rainham, Kent. Two of Ralph's younger brothers married prominent wives: Sir Thomas St Leger (c. 1440 – 1483) married Anne of York (1439–1476), elder sister of Kings Edward IV and Richard III, and Sir James St Leger (c.1441 – post 1509), who married Anne Butler, a daughter of Thomas Butler, 7th Earl of Ormond, great-aunt of Queen Anne Boleyn.

== Marriage and children ==
Ralph married Anne Prophett, daughter of John Prophett. By his wife Ralph had children including:

- Ralph St Leger, Sheriff of Kent in 1502. He married Isabel or Elizabeth Haute, daughter of Richard Haute (died 1487) by his wife Elizabeth Tyrrell, widow of Sir Robert Darcy (c. 1420 – 1469) of Maldon, Essex, and daughter of Sir Thomas Tyrrell (died 28 March 1477) of Heron in East Horndon, Essex. whose eldest son and heir was Sir Anthony St Leger (died 1559), KG, Lord Deputy of Ireland and ancestor of the St Ledger Viscounts Doneraile.
- Jacquetta St Leger, wife of John Fortescue (died 1503) of Filleigh in Devon, ancestor of Earl Fortescue.

== Death and burial ==
He died in 1470 and was buried in Ulcombe Church, where his monumental brass survives showing figures of himself and his wife. It depicts the couple with their hands together in prayer. He is dressed in full armour, his bare head resting on his helm atop which is the crest of St Leger, a griffin passant. His wife Anne lies to his left, and wears a butterfly head-dress. Both figures rest their feet on dogs. The Latin inscription beneath is as follows (expanded from abbreviated Latin):

Orate pro animabus Radulphi Sentleger Armigeri et Anne uxoris suae qui quidam Radulphus obiit undecimo die mensis Novembriis Anno domini millencimo CCCCLXX. Quorum animabus propicietur Deus Amen

Pray for the souls of Ralph Saint Leger, Esquire, and Anne his wife, the said Ralph died on the eleventh day of the month of November in the year of our Lord 1470. On whose souls may God have mercy. Amen

== Sources ==
- Hasted, Edward, History and Topographical Survey of the County of Kent: Volume 5, 1798, pp.385–396, Manor of Ulcombe
- Catherine Stanhope, The Battle Abbey Roll with some Account of the Norman Lineages, 3 vols., London, 1889, "Sent Legere"
- Richardson, Douglas (2011). Everingham, Kimball G. (ed.). Magna Carta Ancestry: A Study in Colonial and Medieval Families. Vol. III (2nd ed.). Salt Lake City. pp. 216–17, 481. ISBN 978-1449966393.
- Robertson, Herbert (1893–95). Stemmata Robertson et Durdin. London: Mitchell and Hughes. pp. 70–1. ISBN 978-1-84383-614-8.
