= All Saints Church, Ulcombe =

Coordinates: 51.217237°N 0.642717°E

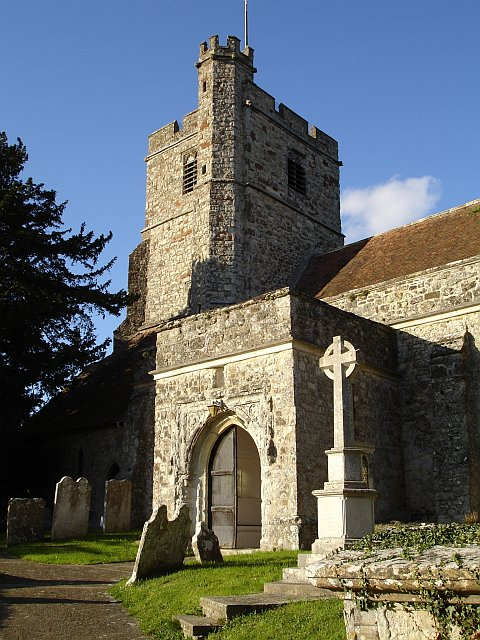

- Location within Kent
- OS grid reference: TQ 84659 49767
- Location: Ulcombe, Kent
- Country: England
- Denomination: Anglican

History
- Status: Parish church

Architecture
- Functional status: Active
- Heritage designation: Grade I
- Designated: 26 April 1968
- Completed: 12th to 15th centuries, restorations 20th century

Administration
- Province: Canterbury
- Diocese: Canterbury
- Archdeaconry: Maidstone
- Deanery: North Downs

All Saints is a parish church in Ulcombe, Kent. It was begun in the 12th century and is a Grade I listed building.

== Building ==
The church was begun in the 12th century, with alterations made during the next three centuries. Internal alterations were made in 1956–63 and the church was restored in the 1980s. The church is constructed variously of coursed and rubble stonework and plain tiled roofs to the nave and chancel. It is a Grade I listed building.

The nave is adjoined along its south side by an aisle and on the eastern end of the north side by a chapel. The chancel has chapels on the north and south sides. The 15th-century west tower is in three stages on a plinth with a battlemented parapet above a moulded string with gargoyles. A taller stair turret, also with battlements and gargoyles, is attached to the south-east corner. The belfry openings in the third stage are two-lighted with cinquefoiled heads. The second stage contains single light windows with trefoiled heads on the three outward facing sides. The west window above the west door is of three lights and traceried. Attached to the south side of the tower is a 19th-century or more recent rubble-built vestry with a lean-to roof. The vestry contains a repositioned medieval trefoil-headed window and a 19th-century doorway and window on the south side.

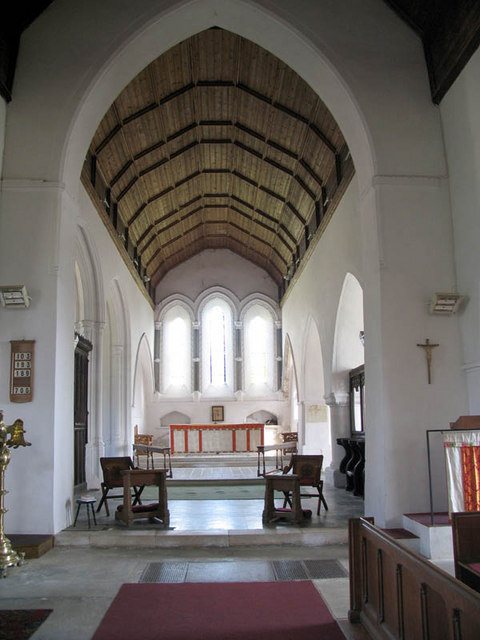
The chancel looking east

The south aisle is 13th century with a plain parapet above a moulded string. A 14th-century window is to the left of the porch with a 19th-century to the right. The wall is buttressed in three places. The porch is 15th-century with a parapet matching the aisle. The inner doorway is probably 14th-century. The south chancel chapel is 12th-century with a lower parapet without a string. The two three-lighted south windows are mostly 19th-century. The window in the east end of the chapel is similar.

The north wall of the nave contains two two-lighted windows with a moulded doorway between. The chapel to the north side of the nave is late 13th century and forms a continuous facade with the adjacent north chancel chapel constructed in the late 15th or early 16th century. The two external corners of the chapels are buttressed diagonally. The east window of the chancel chapel is three-lighted and traceried. The chancel chapel wall contains two three-lighted window and a two-lighted window. The nave chapel walls contain three-lighted windows in the north and west walls. The gabled east wall of the chancel is buttressed on the external corners. The south window is early 14th century with three-lights formed in Bethersden Marble. The three-lighted north window is also 14th century. The 13th-century chancel east window is formed of three separate lights with the centre taller than the sides.

Internally, the nave is separated from the south aisle with a three-bay arcade of 13th-century pointed arches on rectangular piers. The arch to the north nave chapel is similar. The chancel is separated from its chapels with two-bay arcades on each side. The arcade to the south dates from the 13th century but includes a 12th-century column. The north arcade is contemporary with the north chapel. The chancel arch is 13th century on possibly 12th-century bases. The tower arch is 15th century and the arch between the south aisle and the south chapel is 15th century. The roof of the north chancel chapel is early 16th-century with moulded timbers. The other roofs are 19th-century and boarded.

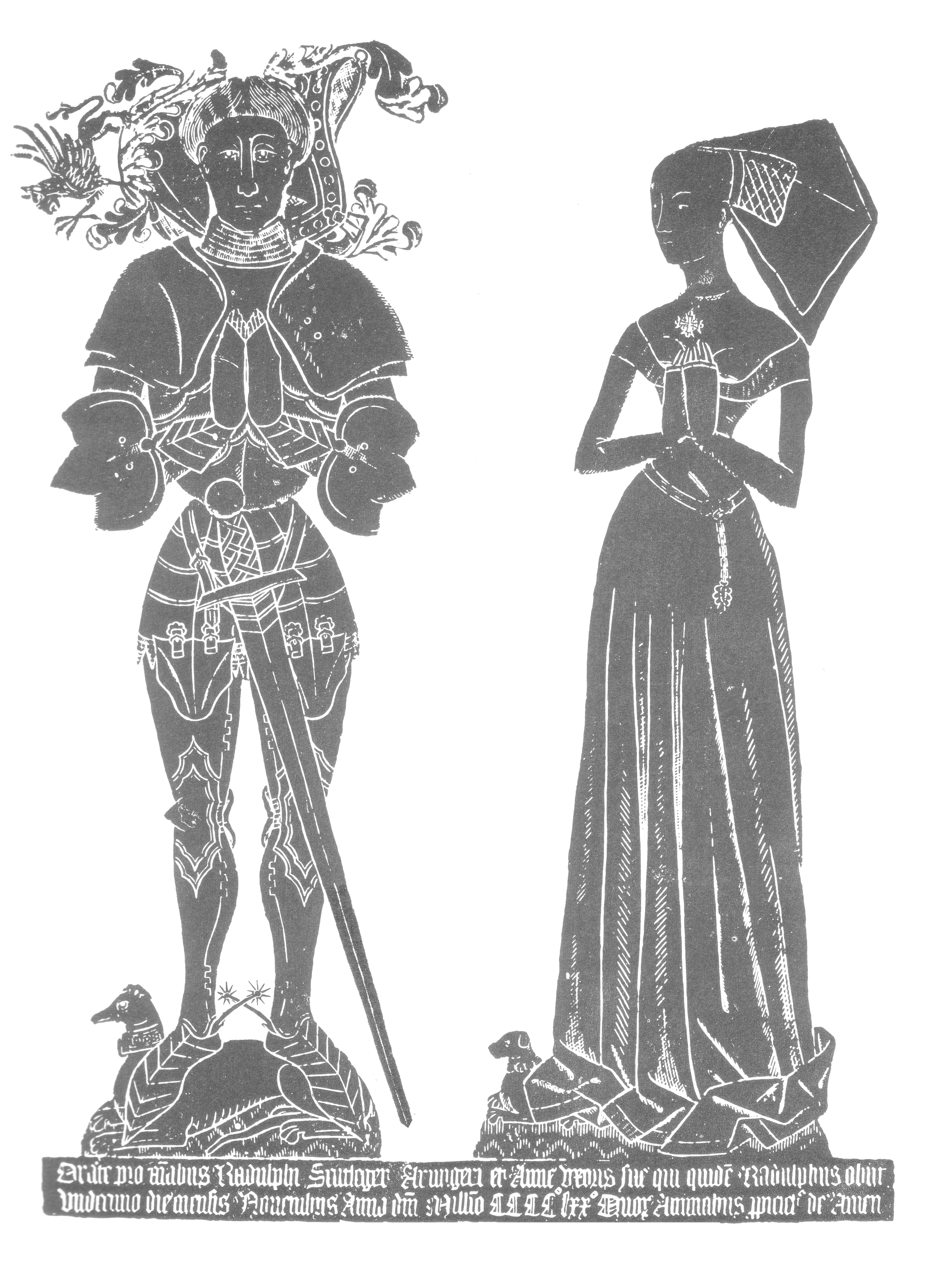
Monumental brass in Ulcombe Church, to Ralph I St Leger (d.1470) and his wife "Anne"

The south wall of the south chapel contains a 13th-century piscina. The east end of the chancel contains two aumbries. The western bays of the north and south arcades in the chancel contain carved screens. The northern one is late 15th or early 16th century with linenfold moulding to the lower part. The southern screen is 15th century with seven cinquefoiled headed lights and stalls below with three carved misericords. The walls feature wall paintings in various locations including St Michael defeating Satan, a number of crucifixions and Dives and Lazarus. The north window of the chancel contains grisaille glass and the east window of the north chapel (or "St Leger Chapel") contains stained glass in memory of the St Leger family, long lords of the manor of Ulcombe

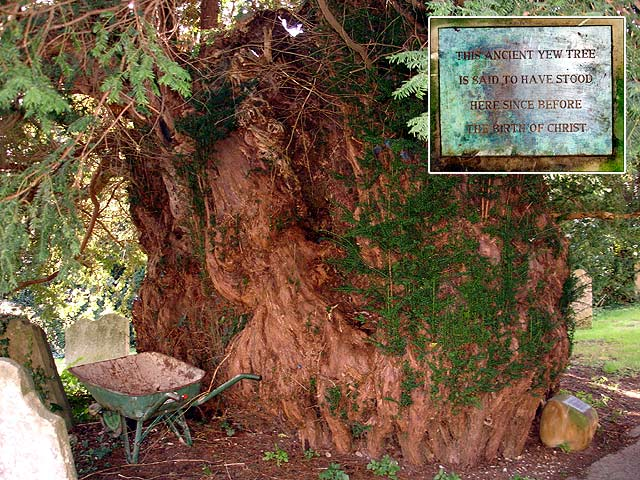
Yew tree in churchyard with plaque claiming it to be more than 2,000 years old

The church contains memorials or monumental brasses to Sir William Maydeston (d 1419), Ralph I St Leger (d 1470) and his wife Anne, Sir Francis Clerke (d. 1685, MP for Rochester), Francis Clerke (d. 1691, also MP for Rochester), William Belcher (d. 1709), Samuel Belcher (d. 1760), members of the Belcher family (d. between 1739 and 1819), Marquess of Ormonde (d. 1820) and Lady Sarah Wandesforde (d. 1838). A further brass, its inscription now lost, is for John St Leger (d. 1442).

The churchyard contains a Grade II listed mid-18th-century table tomb. Also in the churchyard are several ancient Yew trees, one of which is claimed to be over 2,000 years old.

== See also ==
- Grade I listed buildings in Maidstone
