= George Manners, 11th Baron Ros =

English peer (c.1470–1513)

George Manners, 11th Baron Ros of Helmsley
- Arms of Manners (unaugmented): Or, two bars azure a chief gules, as visible impaling St Leger in a window of the Rutland Chantry, St George's Chapel, Windsor Castle. The later chief quarterly azure and gules; in the 1st and 4th quarters two fleurs-de-lis and in the 2nd and 3rd a lion passant guardant all or was granted as an augmentation by King Henry VIII to his son Thomas Manners, 1st Earl of Rutland at the time of his creation as Earl of Rutland, in recognition of his descent in the maternal line from King Edward III.
- Born: c. 1470
- Died: 23 October 1513
- Spouse: Anne St Leger
- Issue: Thomas Manners, 1st Earl of Rutland; Oliver Manners; Anthony Manners; Sir Richard Manners; John Manners; Anne Manners; Eleanor Manners; Elizabeth Manners; Katherine Manners; Cecily Manners; Margaret Manners
- Father: Sir Robert Manners
- Mother: Eleanor Ros

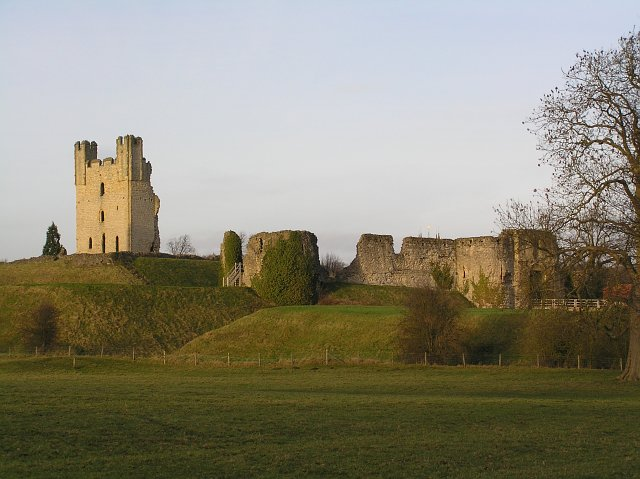
Helmsley Castle, seat of the Manners family

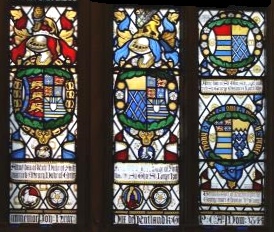
Heraldic glass in the Rutland Chapel, St George's Chapel, Windsor Castle, erected in 1849 by Charles Manners, 6th Duke of Rutland. It shows far left the arms of Anne of York, Duchess of Exeter (1439–1476) impaled by the arms of her 1st husband Henry Holland, 3rd Duke of Exeter. To the right of the last are her arms impaled by the arms of her 2nd husband Sir Thomas St Leger (c. 1440 – 1483), KG. The rightmost window shows top: the arms of Anne's daughter Anne St Leger impaled by the arms of her husband George Manners, 11th Baron de Ros (c. 1470 – 1513). Below are the arms of his son Thomas Manners, 1st Earl of Rutland (c. 1492 – 1543) impaling the arms of his 2nd wife Eleanor Paston

George Manners, 11th Baron de Ros of Helmsley (c. 1470 – 27 October 1513) was an English peer.

== Family ==
George Manners, born about 1470, was the son of Sir Robert Manners (d. 1495) of Etal, Northumberland, and Eleanor de Ros or Roos (d. 1487), eldest daughter of Thomas de Ros, 9th Baron de Ros (9 September 1427 – 17 May 1464), and Philippa Tiptoft (c. 1423 – after 30 January 1487), daughter of John Tiptoft, 1st Baron Tiptoft and Powis. He had a brother and two sisters:

- Edward Manners.
- Elizabeth Manners, who married Sir William Fairfax (d. 11 May 1514) of Steeton, Yorkshire, Justice of the Common Pleas, son and heir of Sir Guy Fairfax of Steeton, Chief Justice of Lancaster, by Margaret, daughter of Sir William Ryther. A descendant of this marriage was the Parliamentary commander, Thomas Fairfax, who on 20 June 1637 married Anne Vere, daughter of Horace Vere, 1st Baron Vere of Tilbury, and Mary Tracy. Their daughter, Mary Fairfax, married George Villiers, 2nd Duke of Buckingham, whose mother, Katherine, was the daughter of Francis Manners, 6th Earl of Rutland.
- Cecily Manners, who married Thomas Fairfax.

== Career ==
Manners was enrolled at Lincoln's Inn on 12 May 1490. In 1508, he was coheir to his uncle, Edmund de Ros, 10th Baron de Ros. In 1492, it had been determined that Edmund de Ros was unable to administer his own affairs, and he was placed in the custody of his brother-in-law, Sir Thomas Lovell, husband of Manners' aunt, Isabel Lovell. Edmund de Ros died on 23 October 1508, and was buried in the parish church at Elsing in Enfield, Middlesex. In about 1509, Manners was the sole heir to his aunt, Isabel Lovell.

Manners was with Thomas Howard, then Earl of Surrey, in the Scottish campaign of 1497, and was knighted by him on or before 30 September of that year. He was in attendance in 1500 when King Henry VII met Archduke Philip near Calais. In November 1501, he was among those who received Catherine of Aragon at St. George's Field. He was nominated to the Order of the Garter on 27 April 1510, although not elected.

In 1513, Manners campaigned in France. He was a commander at the siege of Thérouanne, and was present at the siege of Tournai. He fell ill about the time Tournai surrendered on 23 September 1513.

Manners died on 27 October 1513, either in France or at Holywell in Shoreditch. He may have been first buried at Holywell, and his body later removed to St George's Chapel, Windsor Castle. His effigy is in the Rutland Chapel. His widow, Anne, died on 21 April 1526, and was buried at St. George's, Windsor.

Manners owned a medieval manuscript copy of a chanson de geste, Les Voeux du Paon (The Vows of the Peacock), by Jacques de Longuyon, which is now Spencer Collection MS 009 in the New York Public Library. Manners wrote his name on a flyleaf of the manuscript, folio i verso, which may be viewed online.

== Marriage and issue ==
Manners married, about 1490, Anne St Leger (c. 1475/6 – 21 April 1526), daughter and heiress of Thomas St. Leger by Anne of York, Duchess of Exeter, the second child and eldest surviving daughter of Richard of York, 3rd Duke of York, and Cecily Neville (1415–1495), daughter of Ralph Neville, 1st Earl of Westmorland. Anne of York was the elder sister of King Edward IV; Edmund, Earl of Rutland; Elizabeth of York, Duchess of Suffolk; Margaret of York, Duchess of Burgundy; George Plantagenet, 1st Duke of Clarence and King Richard III.

George Manners and Anne St Leger had five sons and six daughters:

- Thomas Manners, 1st Earl of Rutland, who married Eleanor Paston, credited with saying to Anne of Cleves, 'Madam there must be more to it than that, or it will be long before we have a Duke of York which all this realm much desireth'. Their son, Henry Manners, 2nd Earl of Rutland, married Margaret Neville, daughter of Ralph Neville, 4th Earl of Westmorland by Katherine Stafford.
- Oliver Manners.
- Anthony Manners.
- Sir Richard Manners.
- John Manners.
- Anne Manners, who married Sir Henry Capell.
- Eleanor Manners, who married John Bourchier, 2nd Earl of Bath.
- Elizabeth Manners, who married Thomas Sandys, 2nd Baron Sandys.
- Katherine Manners, also known as Catherine Manners (c. 1510–c. 1547), who married Sir Robert Constable.
- Cecily Manners.
- Margaret Manners, who married firstly, Sir Henry Strangeways (son of Giles Strangways), and secondly, Robert Heneage.

== Monument ==
His monument, consisting of a grand chest tomb with sculpted effigies of himself and his wife, survives in the Rutland Chantry (formerly the St Leger Chantry, founded by his father-in-law Sir Thomas St Leger) forming the north transept of St George's Chapel, Windsor Castle. The base of the monument and the stained glass windows display much heraldry of the Manners and St Leger families.

== Footnotes ==
Peerage of England
Preceded by Edmund de Ros	Baron de Ros c. 1512–1513	Succeeded by Thomas Manners
