= Anne of York =

Anne of York may refer to:

- Anne of York, Duchess of Exeter (1439–1476), daughter of Richard Plantagenet, 3rd Duke of York and Cecily Neville; wife first of Henry Holland, 3rd Duke of Exeter, second of Thomas St. Leger
- Anne of York (daughter of Edward IV) (1475–1511), daughter of Edward IV, King of England, and Elizabeth Woodville; wife of Thomas Howard, later 3rd Duke of Norfolk
