= Tresilian =

Tresilian may refer to:

- John Tresilian (c. 1450 – after 1515), an English master smith
- Robert Tresilian (died 1388), an English lawyer
- Stuart Tresilian (1891-1974), English artist and illustrator
- Tresilian Bay, Vale of Glamorgan, Wales
