= John St Leger =

John St Leger may refer to:

- John St. Leger (died 1596), of Annery, Devon
- John St Leger (1674–1743), Irish judge
- John St Leger (died 1441) of Ulcombe, Kent
