= Thomas St. Leger =

English nobleman

Sir Thomas St. Leger
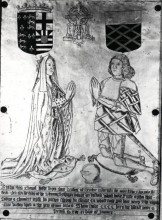
- Thomas with his wife
- Born: c. 1440
- Died: 13 November 1483; Exeter, Devonshire, England
- Resting place: St. George's Chapel, Windsor
- Spouse: Anne of York, Duchess of Exeter
- Children: Anne St Leger
- Parent(s): Sir John St Leger of Ulcombe; Margery Donnet

Arms of St Ledger: Azure fretty argent, a chief or

Sir Thomas St Leger KB (c. 1440 – executed 13 November 1483) was the second son of Sir John St Leger (d.1441) of Ulcombe, Kent, and his wife, Margery Donnet. He was also the second husband of Anne of York (10 August 1439 – 1 February 1476), daughter of Richard Plantagenet, 3rd Duke of York (by his wife Cecily Neville) and thus she was an elder sister of Kings Edward IV (1461–1483) and Richard III (1483–1485). His younger brother, Sir James St Leger of Annery in Devon, married Anne Butler, daughter of Thomas Butler, 7th Earl of Ormond, and was, therefore, an uncle to Thomas Boleyn, 1st Earl of Wiltshire.

== Career ==
St. Leger faithfully served Edward IV in both a military and administrative capacity for years. For his loyal service, Edward IV rewarded St. Leger with a substantial grant of eight manors in the early 1460s. He had a lucky escape from justice in 1465 when he was arrested for brawling in the Palace of Westminster and sentenced to have his hand cut off. Edward IV, however, granted him a pardon. Thomas fought for Edward at the Battles of Barnet and Tewkesbury.

St Leger played a key role in ending the Hundred Years' War when he signed the Treaty of Picquigny with Louis XI on 29 August 1475. He was granted by Louis XI a pension of 12,000 crowns annually which was to be distributed between himself, Thomas Grey, 1st Marquess of Dorset, Sir John Howard (later Duke of Norfolk), Sir Thomas Montgomery, and some other of the profligate courtiers.

Thomas was also knighted as a member of the Order of the Bath.

== Marriage ==
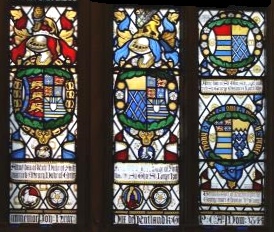
Heraldic glass in the Rutland Chapel, St George's Chapel, Windsor Castle, erected in 1849 by Charles Manners, 6th Duke of Rutland. It shows far left the arms of Anne of York, Duchess of Exeter (1439–1476) impaled by the arms of her 1st husband Henry Holland, 3rd Duke of Exeter. To the right of the last are her arms impaled by the arms of her 2nd husband Sir Thomas St. Leger (c. 1440 – 1483), KG. The rightmost window shows top: the arms of Anne's daughter Anne St Leger impaled by the arms of her husband George Manners, 11th Baron de Ros (c. 1470 – 1513). Below are the arms of his son Thomas Manners, 1st Earl of Rutland (c. 1492 – 1543), impaling the arms of his 2nd wife Eleanor Paston

Thomas was most likely the lover of Anne of York, before their marriage in c. 1474. She had been married at the age of eight to Henry Holland, 3rd Duke of Exeter, in 1447. Anne and Exeter had had one daughter, named Anne, who had been born in c. 1455. The marriage was unhappy and Exeter and his wife mostly lived apart. Exeter was also a loyal Lancastrian while his wife was a Yorkist, and Exeter fought against Richard, 3rd Duke of York, at the Battle of Wakefield where Anne's father and her brother, Edmund, Earl of Rutland, died in battle.

Anne and Exeter eventually separated. Thomas fought against Exeter at the Battle of Barnet, where Exeter was badly wounded and left for dead, but survived. Exeter was later imprisoned, and Anne divorced him in 1472. Exeter was also on Edward's expedition with Thomas St Leger to France in 1475. On the return voyage, he fell overboard and drowned. Some say he was in fact thrown overboard at the King's command. St Leger's stepdaughter, Anne Holland, died sometime around 1474, leaving her inherited Exeter estates behind.

Anne of York died giving birth in 1476 to her only child with Thomas, another girl, also named Anne. Following his wife's death, St. Leger remained on good terms with his brother-in-law, Edward IV, and served as the King's Controller of the Mint. In 1481, he was granted a licence to found a perpetual chantry of two chaplains at the Chapel of St. George in memory of his wife. He never remarried. In 1483, by Act of Parliament, Anne St. Leger was declared heiress to the entire Exeter estate, except for a portion which was given to the queen's son Richard Grey. This act, by which the lands of the Exeter dukedom fell into the hands of the last duke's stepdaughter and his daughter's brother-in-law, along with a number of similar acts, is thought to be a cause of difficulty in maintaining noble support for the reign of Edward IV.

== Rebellion and death ==
Thomas's brother-in-law, Edward IV, whom he had served faithfully, died suddenly on 9 April 1483, leaving behind a twelve-year-old son, Edward V, who was by marriage Thomas's nephew. However, Richard III ascended the throne in July 1483. Thomas St. Leger attended the new king's coronation and was given cloth of silver and velvet for the occasion, but he was soon deprived of his positions of Master of Harthounds and Controller of the Mint. His daughter Anne was ordered to be handed over to Henry Stafford, 2nd Duke of Buckingham. It has been suggested that Buckingham had the heiress in mind as a bride for his own eldest son Edward. This never came to pass, for both St. Leger and Buckingham ended up in rebellion against the new king. St Leger had been unshakably faithful to Edward IV and, like many of the other rebels of the rebellion of 1483, was undoubtedly distressed at Edward V having disappeared from sight after having been deprived of his crown.

When the rebellion floundered, St. Leger continued the fight in Exeter, but was captured. He was executed on 13 November 1483, at Exeter Castle, despite the offer of large sums of money on his behalf. He had been executed with Sir John Rame. St. Leger, described by the Crowland Chronicler as a “most noble knight,” received a private burial. They are not buried in Rutland Chapel as most believe.

His daughter Anne St Leger (14 January 1476 – 21 April 1526) eventually married George Manners, 11th Baron de Ros. Their son was Thomas Manners, 1st Earl of Rutland, and their daughter, Lady Eleanor Manners (1505 – 16 September 1548) married John Bourchier, 2nd Earl of Bath, and had descendants including daughter Elizabeth Bourchier who married Sir Richard Thomas Chase of Hundrich. Lady Anne St. Leger and her husband George are both buried in the private Rutland Chapel in Windsor Castle.
