= Anthony St Leger (Lord Deputy of Ireland) =

16th-century English politician

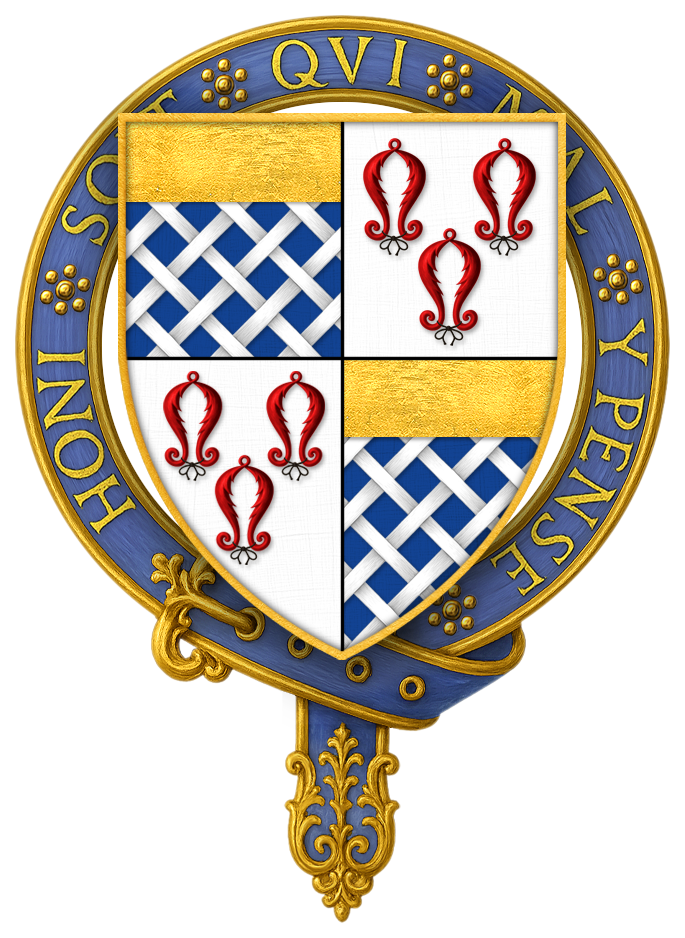
Arms of Sir Anthony St Leger, KG: quarterly 1 & 4: Azure fretty argent, a chief or (St Leger); 2 & 3: Argent, three pairs of barnacles gules tied sable (Donet of Silham, Rainham, Kent), circumscribed by the Garter

Sir Anthony St Leger, KG (or Sellenger; c. 1496 – 16 March 1559), of Ulcombe and Leeds Castle in Kent, was an English politician and Lord Deputy of Ireland during the Tudor period.

== Origins ==
Anthony St Leger was the eldest son of Ralph II St Leger of Ulcombe in Kent, by his wife Isabel (or Elizabeth) Haute. She was the daughter of Richard Haute (d. 8 April 1487, son of William Haute) by his wife Elizabeth Tyrrell, widow of Sir Robert Darcy (c. 1420 - 2 November 1469) of Maldon, Essex, and daughter of Sir Thomas Tyrrell (d. 28 March 1477) of Heron in the parish of East Horndon, Essex (son of John Tyrrell).ii

== Career ==
He was educated abroad and at the University of Cambridge. He quickly gained the favour of King Henry VIII (1509–1547), and in 1537 was appointed president of a commission of enquiry into the condition of Ireland. In the course of this work, he obtained much useful knowledge of the country. In 1539, he was knighted and appointed Sheriff of Kent.

=== Lord Deputy of Ireland ===
On 7 July 1540, Sir Anthony was appointed Lord Deputy of Ireland and tasked with the repression of disorder. He moved against the MacMorrough-Kavanagh clan, who had long claimed the title of King of Leinster, permitting them to retain their lands only by accepting feudal tenure on the English model. By a similar policy, he exacted obedience from the O'Mores, O'Tooles and O'Conors in Leix and Offaly. Having conciliated the O'Briens in the west and the Earl of Desmond in the south, he obtained the passage of an act in the Irish Parliament in Dublin, which conferred the title of King of Ireland on King Henry VIII and his heirs. Conn O'Neill, who had remained sullenly hostile, was forced to submit. The policy was adopted and became known as "Surrender and regrant".

St Leger's policy was generally one of moderation and conciliation, more so than Henry VIII wished. He recommended the head of the House of O'Brien, when he gave token of a submissive disposition, for the title of Earl of Thomond. O'Neill was created Earl of Tyrone. At St Leger's urging, the King in 1541 created six new Irish peerages. St Leger argued that the loyalty of the Anglo-Irish nobility could be better achieved "by small gifts and honest persuasion than by rigor", which seems to be an implicit criticism of the savage manner in which the Rebellion of Silken Thomas had been suppressed. St Leger's policy of conciliation seems to have been successful: in particular, the Plunkett family, who received the title of Baron Louth, became steadfast loyalists to the English Crown, as did the Fitzpatrick family, who received the title of Baron Upper Ossory. Barnaby Fitzpatrick, 2nd Baron Upper Ossory grew up at Henry VIII's court, and he was a beloved childhood friend of Henry's son, Edward VI.

An administrative council was instituted in the province of Munster, and in 1544, a levy of Irish soldiers was raised for service in Henry VIII's wars. St Leger's personal influence was proved by an outbreak of disturbance when he visited England in 1544, and the prompt restoration of order upon his return some months later. St Leger retained his office under King Edward VI (1547–1553), and again effectively quelled attempts at rebellion by the O'Conors and O'Byrnes. From 1548 to 1550, Sir Anthony was in England and returned to Ireland charged with the duty of introducing the reformed liturgy to that island. His conciliatory methods led to his recall in the summer of 1551. After the accession of Queen Mary I (1553–1558), he was again appointed Lord Deputy in October 1553, but a charge of keeping false accounts caused him to be recalled for the third time in 1556. He died while the accusation was still under investigation, by which time, in 1559, he had been elected Member of Parliament for Kent.

== Knight of the Garter ==
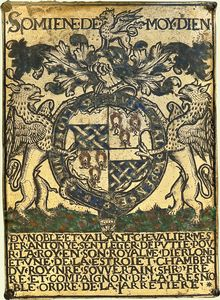
Garter stall plate of Sir Anthony St Leger, KG, St George's Chapel, Windsor Castle

In 1544, he was nominated by King Henry VIII as a Knight of the Garter. His Garter stall plate survives, affixed to his former stall in St George's Chapel, Windsor Castle. It is inscribed above with the motto: SOMIENE DE MOY DIEN (apparently garbled French, possibly for souviens de mon dieu, "I remember my God"?) and at the base in semi-illiterate French (i.e. with basic errors in gender):

Du noble et vailant chevalier mesier Antonye Sentleger Deputie pour la roy en son royalme d'Ierlond et une de la estroiet chamber du roy NRE (n(ot)re?) souverain SHR frere et compaignon de la tres noble Ordre de la Jarretiere ("Of the noble and valiant knight Sir Anthony St Ledger, deputy for the king in his kingdom of Ireland and one of the privy chamber of the king (our?) sovereign SHR? brother and companion of the most noble Order of the Garter").

The heraldry shows an escutcheon circumscribed by the Garter displaying the arms quarterly 1 & 4: Azure fretty argent (St Ledger); 2 & 3: Argent, three barnacles gules tied sable (Donet of Sileham, Rainham, Kent). Sir Anthony's great-grandfather Sir John St Leger (d.1442) of Ulcombe, married Margery Donet (or Donnet), daughter and heiress of James Donet (d.1409) of Sileham. His crest is shown as: A griffin statant (Crest of St Leger family, Viscount Doneraile: A griffin passant or (Debrett's Peerage, 1968, p. 365)) and his supporters: Two griffins wings elevated (supporters of St Leger family, Viscount Doneraile: Two griffins or wings elevated azure fretty argent (Debrett's Peerage, 1968, p. 365)).

== Character ==
St Leger seems to have been a quarrelsome and unpopular man; certainly, he was on very bad terms with other leading figures in the Dublin administration, particularly John Alan, Lord Chancellor of Ireland, and George Browne, Archbishop of Dublin. Following complaints by St Leger, Alan was removed from office and although he was later reinstated, the two men found it impossible to work together. Archbishop Browne accused St. Leger of treasonable words, giving Alan as his source, but the charge came to nothing when Alan, surprisingly, refused to confirm the report. When St Leger gave high military command to James Butler, 9th Earl of Ormond, he was accused by allies of Alan's of deliberately doing this to endanger Ormond's life. Ormond's mysterious death from poisoning in London in 1546, with 16 of his household, when he went to dinner in the Ely Palace was, at the least, extremely convenient for St Leger, although there is no real evidence that he was responsible for it. Suspicion lingered because there was no proper investigation of the death, despite Ormond's wealth and social standing.

== Landholdings ==
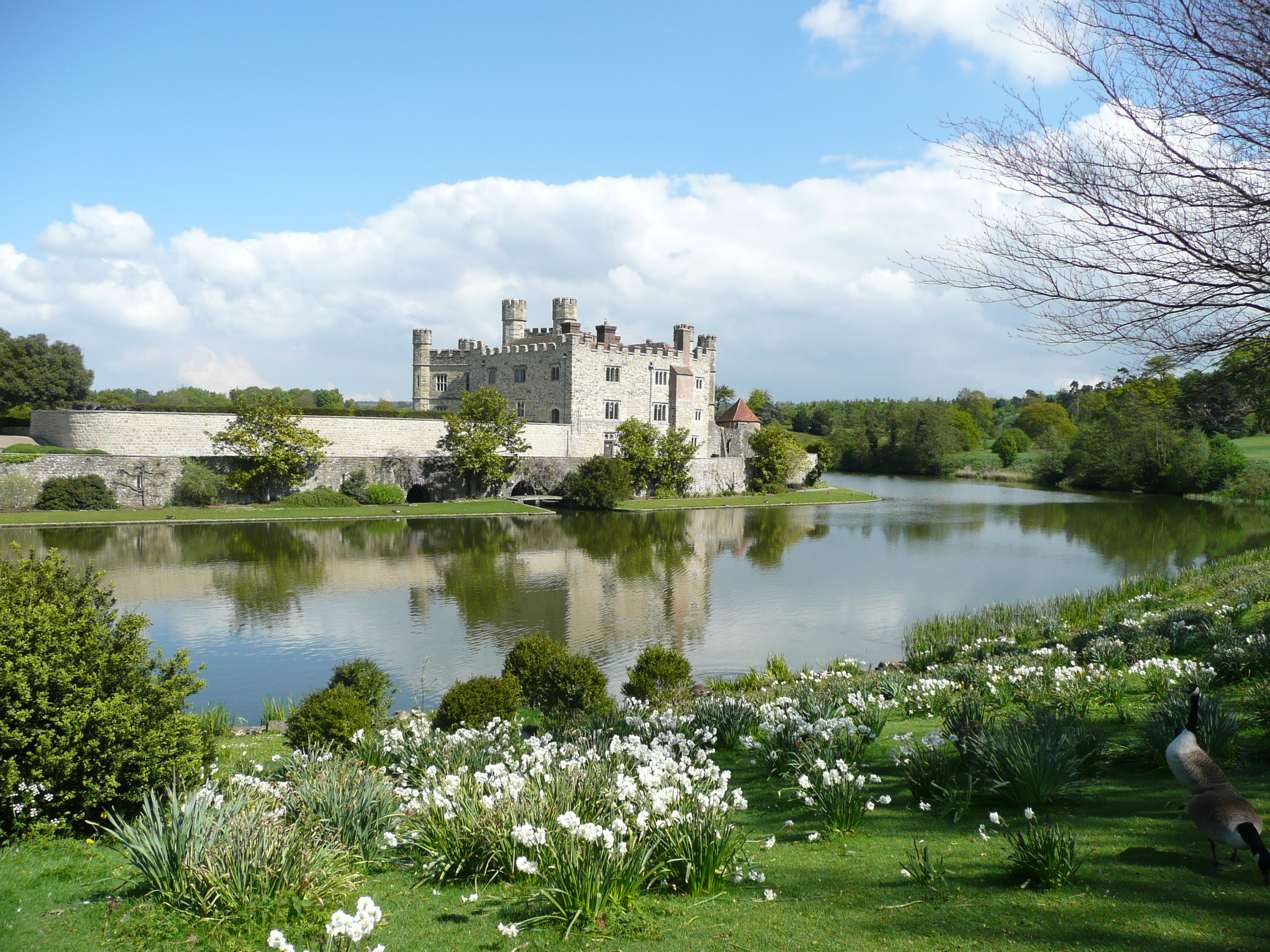
Leeds Castle in Kent, granted to Sir Anthony St Leger in 1552

As well as having inherited the paternal estate of Ulcombe, the St Leger family's seat from the 11th century, in 1552, he was granted possession of Leeds Castle in Kent, of which his grandfather Ralph St Leger (d.1470) had been a constable.

== Marriage and progeny ==
St Leger married Agnes Warham, daughter of Sir Hugh Warham of Croydon by Marion, daughter of Geoffrey Colle, and niece of William Warham, Archbishop of Canterbury.

By Agnes, he had at least five sons and two daughters, including:

- William St Leger, who predeceased his father, albeit having left a son Sir Warham St Leger (d. 1600), whose own son was William St Leger (d. 1642), President of Munster.
- Warham St Leger

== Sources ==
- Hasler, M.R.P. & P. W., Biography of St Leger (Sellenger), Sir Anthony (c.1496-1559), of Ulcombe and Leeds Castle, Kent, published in History of Parliament: the House of Commons 1558-1603, ed. P.W. Hasler, 1981
- Richardson, Douglas (2011). Everingham, Kimball G. (ed.). Magna Carta Ancestry: A Study in Colonial and Medieval Families. Vol. III (2nd ed.). Salt Lake City. pp. 216–17, 481. ISBN 978-1449966393.
- Robertson, Herbert (1893–95). Stemmata Robertson et Durdin. London: Mitchell and Hughes. pp. 70–1. ISBN 978-1-84383-614-8.
- Dunlop, Robert (1897). "St. Leger, Anthony" . In Lee, Sidney (ed.). Dictionary of National Biography. Vol. 50. London: Smith, Elder & Co.
- Bryson, Alan. "St Leger, Sir Anthony (1496?–1559)". Oxford Dictionary of National Biography (online ed.). Oxford University Press. doi:10.1093/ref:odnb/24512. (Subscription, Wikipedia Library access or UK public library membership required.)

Attribution

== Notes ==
- A biography of Sir Anthony St Leger will be found in Athenae Cantabrigienses, by Charles Henry Cooper and Thompson Cooper (Cambridge, 1858)

According to the Irish Genealogical Office, Kildare Street, Dublin, Sir Anthony St Leger KG held office as the King's Deputy (Lord Deputy) in Ireland for five terms, not three, as commonly held. His terms of office were as follows :

1st term: 7 July 1540 to 10 February 1544 2nd term: 3 July 1544 to 1 April 1546 3rd term: 7 November 1546 to 21 May 1548 4th term: 4 August 1550 to 23 May 1551 5th term: 1 September 1553 to 26 May 1556

See also

- Calendar of State Papers relating to Ireland, Hen. VIII-Eliz.
- Calendar of Letters and Papers of the Reign of Henry VIII.
- Calendar of State Papers (Domestic Series), Edward VI-James I
- Calendar of Carew Manuscripts
- J O'Donovan's edition of Annals of Ireland by the Four Masters (7 vols., Dublin, 1851)
- Richard Bagwell, Ireland under the Tudors (3 Vols., London, 1885–1890)
- JA Froude, History of England (12 vols., London, 1856–1870).

For Sir William St Leger, see:

- Strafford's Letters and Despatches (2 vols., London, 1739)
- Thomas Carte, History of the Life of James, Duke of Ormonde (6 vols., Oxford, 1851)
- History of the Irish Confederation and the War in Ireland, edited by J. T. Gilbert (Dublin, 1882–1891).

Political offices
Preceded by The Viscount Grane	Lord Deputy of Ireland; 1540–1548	Succeeded by Edward Bellingham
Preceded by Lord Justices	Lord Deputy of Ireland; 1550–1551	Succeeded by James Croft
Preceded by Lords Justices	Lord Deputy of Ireland; 1553–1556	Succeeded by The Lord FitzWalter
Parliament of England
Preceded by Thomas Cheyney with John Baker	Member of Parliament for Kent; 1559; With: Thomas Kempe	Succeeded by Henry Sidney with Sir Henry Cheyne
