= Anne St Leger, Baroness de Ros =

English noblewoman (1476–1526)

Anne St Leger
- Born: 14 January 1476
- Died: 21 April 1526 (aged 50)
- Resting place: St. George's Chapel, Windsor Castle
- Spouse: George Manners, 11th Baron de Ros
- Children: Thomas Manners, 1st Earl of Rutland... and 10 others
- Parent(s): Anne of York, Duchess of Exeter; Sir Thomas St. Leger
- Relatives: Edward IV of England (uncle); Richard III of England (uncle)

Anne St Leger (later Baroness de Ros; 14 January 1476 – 21 April 1526) was a niece of two kings of England, Edward IV and Richard III. Before she was eight years old, she had inherited a vast fortune and been disinherited of it. Married at 14, she had eleven children and is a link in the maternal line that was used to identify the remains of Richard III.

== Inheritance ==
Anne St Leger was born on 14 January 1476, during the reign of her maternal uncle King Edward IV. Her mother, Anne of York, Duchess of Exeter, died the same day of complications surrounding the birth. Her father was the Duchess of Exeter's second husband, Sir Thomas St. Leger. Lady Anne Holland, her maternal half-sister fathered by Henry Holland, 3rd Duke of Exeter, died before she was born. According to the 1467 grant, the Duchess of Exeter inherited the estate which her elder daughter had inherited from her father, the Duke of Exeter. The grant stipulated that most of the Exeter inheritance was to pass to the duchess's heirs of the body, even if fathered by a subsequent husband. Anne inherited the enormous estate at birth, as it coincided with her mother's death.

A greatly desirable bride since her birth, Anne was contracted to marry Lord Ferrers of Groby. He was the eldest son of Thomas Grey, 1st Marquess of Dorset, who had been married to her older half-sister and whose mother was her aunt, King Edward IV's wife Elizabeth Woodville. Queen Elizabeth was determined to secure the Exeter inheritance for her descendants by her first marriage, and in 1483, St Leger was declared heir to the entire estate of her father by an act of parliament. The arrangement, detrimental to the interests of the surviving descendants of the Holland family, resulted in a growing unpopularity of King Edward IV and Queen Elizabeth. Anne was disinherited and her father executed by another maternal uncle, King Richard III, immediately after his accession in 1483. Following the Battle of Bosworth Field, in which Richard III was killed, the match between St Leger and Ferrers was discarded.

== Marriage and descendants ==
Anne St Leger eventually married about 1490 or about 1495 George Manners, 11th Baron de Ros, who fought on behalf of Henry VII in Scotland and for Henry VIII in France, by whom she had eleven children: five sons—Thomas, Oliver, Anthony, Richard and John Manners—and six daughters—Anne Capell, Eleanor Bourchier, Elizabeth Sandys, Catherine Constable, Cecily Manners and Margaret Heneage.

George Manners became Baron de Ros in about 1512, making Anne Baroness de Ros. She was widowed the following year, and died in 1526, during the reign of her first cousin once removed, King Henry VIII. She is buried at St George's Chapel, Windsor Castle.
