= Listed buildings in Ulcombe =

Civil Parish in Kent, England

Ulcombe is a village and civil parish in the Borough of Maidstone of Kent, England It contains one grade I, two grade II* and 32 grade II listed buildings that are recorded in the National Heritage List for England.

This list is based on the information retrieved online from Historic England.

== Key ==
Grade	Criteria
I	Buildings that are of exceptional interest
II*	Particularly important buildings of more than special interest
II	Buildings that are of special interest

== Listing ==
Name	Grade	Location	Type	Completed (Note: The date given is the date used by Historic England as significant for the initial building or that of an important part in the structure's description.)	Date designated	Grid ref. (Note: The grid reference is based on the British national grid reference system, sometimes known as OSGB36, used by the Ordnance Survey.) Geo-coordinates	Notes	Entry number (Note: The "List Entry Number" is a unique number assigned to each listed building and scheduled monument by Historic England.)	Image	Wikidata
Ulcombe Hill Farmhouse	II				26 April 1968	TQ8510850282; 51°13′18″N 0°38′58″E		1187160	Upload Photo	Q26482382
Boy Court Farmhouse	II	Boy Court Lane			26 April 1968	TQ8466046092; 51°11′03″N 0°38′27″E		1060883	Upload Photo	Q26314033
Barn About 17 Metres South of Chegworth Court	II	Chegworth Road			18 December 1985	TQ8497252074; 51°14′16″N 0°38′54″E		1344288	Upload Photo	Q26628024
Barn About 33 Metres North of Chegworth Manor Farmhouse	II	Chegworth Road			18 December 1985	TQ8491252762; 51°14′39″N 0°38′52″E		1060886	Upload Photo	Q26314036
Chegworth Court Farmhouse	II	Chegworth Road			26 April 1968	TQ8497052107; 51°14′17″N 0°38′54″E		1372023	Upload Photo	Q26653147
Chegworth Manor Farmhouse	II	Chegworth Road			26 April 1968	TQ8491252720; 51°14′37″N 0°38′52″E		1344289	Upload Photo	Q26628025
Chegworth Mill House	II	Chegworth Road			18 December 1985	TQ8497252698; 51°14′36″N 0°38′55″E		1057671	Upload Photo	Q26309838
Chegworth Water Mill	II	Chegworth Road			26 April 1968	TQ8495252690; 51°14′36″N 0°38′54″E		1060885	Upload Photo	Q26314035
Little Chegworth	II	Chegworth Road			25 March 1982	TQ8497852216; 51°14′21″N 0°38′55″E		1040077	Upload Photo	Q26291883
The Cottage	II	Chegworth Road			9 October 1980	TQ8494052683; 51°14′36″N 0°38′54″E		1060884	Upload Photo	Q26314034
Brunger Farmhouse	II	Crumps Lane			18 December 1985	TQ8461947447; 51°11′47″N 0°38′27″E		1039120	Upload Photo	Q26290901
Kingsnorth Manor Farmhouse	II*	Crumps Lane	farmhouse		26 April 1968	TQ8485147535; 51°11′50″N 0°38′40″E		1344290	Kingsnorth Manor Farmhouse More images	Q17545385
Mansion House Farmhouse	II	Crumps Lane			26 April 1968	TQ8572647651; 51°11′52″N 0°39′25″E		1345559	Upload Photo	Q26629171
Roselands Farmhouse	II	Crumps Lane			18 December 1985	TQ8443947405; 51°11′46″N 0°38′18″E		1060887	Upload Photo	Q26314037
Sparrow Hall	II	Headcorn Road			18 December 1985	TQ8436946811; 51°11′27″N 0°38′13″E		1060888	Upload Photo	Q26314038
Knowle Hill Farmhouse	II	Knowle Hill			26 April 1968	TQ8588349262; 51°12′44″N 0°39′36″E		1374143	Upload Photo	Q26655042
Knowle Hill House	II	Knowle Hill			26 April 1968	TQ8597149373; 51°12′48″N 0°39′41″E		1344291	Upload Photo	Q26628026
Lower Knowle Hill Farmhouse	II	Knowle Hill			26 April 1968	TQ8589248958; 51°12′34″N 0°39′36″E		1374219	Upload Photo	Q26655111
Mansion Farmhouse Including Ancillary Buildings and Structures	II*	Knowle Hill, ME17 1ES			26 April 1968	TQ8585048954; 51°12′34″N 0°39′34″E		1060889	Upload Photo	Q26314039
Maple Cottage	II	Knowle Hill			18 December 1985	TQ8570548518; 51°12′20″N 0°39′25″E		1038539	Upload Photo	Q26290239
The Provender Public House	II	Pye Corner			18 December 1985	TQ8529448591; 51°12′23″N 0°39′04″E		1344292	Upload Photo	Q26628027
Barn About 30 Metres North West of Jubilee Hall	II	Stickfast Lane			18 December 1985	TQ8410847440; 51°11′47″N 0°38′01″E		1038336	Upload Photo	Q26290050
Jubilee Hall	II	Stickfast Lane			18 December 1985	TQ8413147416; 51°11′47″N 0°38′02″E		1060890	Upload Photo	Q26314040
Chestnut Farm	II	The Street			18 December 1985	TQ8485148913; 51°12′34″N 0°38′42″E		1060891	Upload Photo	Q26314041
Street House and Street House Cottage	II	The Street			18 December 1985	TQ8473549250; 51°12′45″N 0°38′37″E		1060849	Upload Photo	Q26314008
The Harrow Public House	II	The Street			21 June 1978	TQ8477049135; 51°12′41″N 0°38′38″E		1038308	Upload Photo	Q26290025
Church Farmhouse	II	Ulcombe Hill			18 December 1985	TQ8462749721; 51°13′01″N 0°38′32″E		1352655	Upload Photo	Q26635643
Church of All Saints	I	Ulcombe Hill, ME17 1DN	church building		26 April 1968	TQ8465949767; 51°13′02″N 0°38′34″E		1060850	Church of All Saints More images	Q4729533
Table Tomb to John Earl About 4 Metres South of Church of All Saints	II	Ulcombe Hill			18 December 1985	TQ8466649742; 51°13′01″N 0°38′34″E		1060851	Upload Photo	Q95115365
Ulcombe Place	II	Ulcombe Hill			18 December 1985	TQ8469349785; 51°13′03″N 0°38′36″E		1060852	Upload Photo	Q26314009
Cherry Gardens Farmhouse	II	Water Lane			18 December 1985	TQ8565751949; 51°14′11″N 0°39′29″E		1060853	Upload Photo	Q26314010
Water Lane Farmhouse	II	Water Lane, Chegworth			18 December 1985	TQ8553452264; 51°14′22″N 0°39′23″E		1352687	Upload Photo	Q26635673
Poplar Tree Cottages	II	Windmill Hill			18 December 1985	TQ8539448742; 51°12′28″N 0°39′10″E		1060854	Upload Photo	Q26314011
The Pepperbox Inn	II	Windmill Hill			26 April 1968	TQ8586550075; 51°13′11″N 0°39′36″E		1031813	Upload Photo	Q26283204
Upper Hill Farmhouse	II	Windmill Hill			26 April 1968	TQ8564849794; 51°13′02″N 0°39′25″E		1031819	Upload Photo	Q26283210

== See also ==
- Grade I listed buildings in Kent
- Grade II* listed buildings in Kent

== Sources ==
- Newman, John (2012) [1969], Kent: West and the Weald, The Buildings of England, New Haven and London: Yale University Press, ISBN 978-0-300-18509-6
