= St George's Chapel, Windsor Castle =

Royal chapel in Windsor Castle, England

- The King's Free Chapel of the College of St George, Windsor Castle
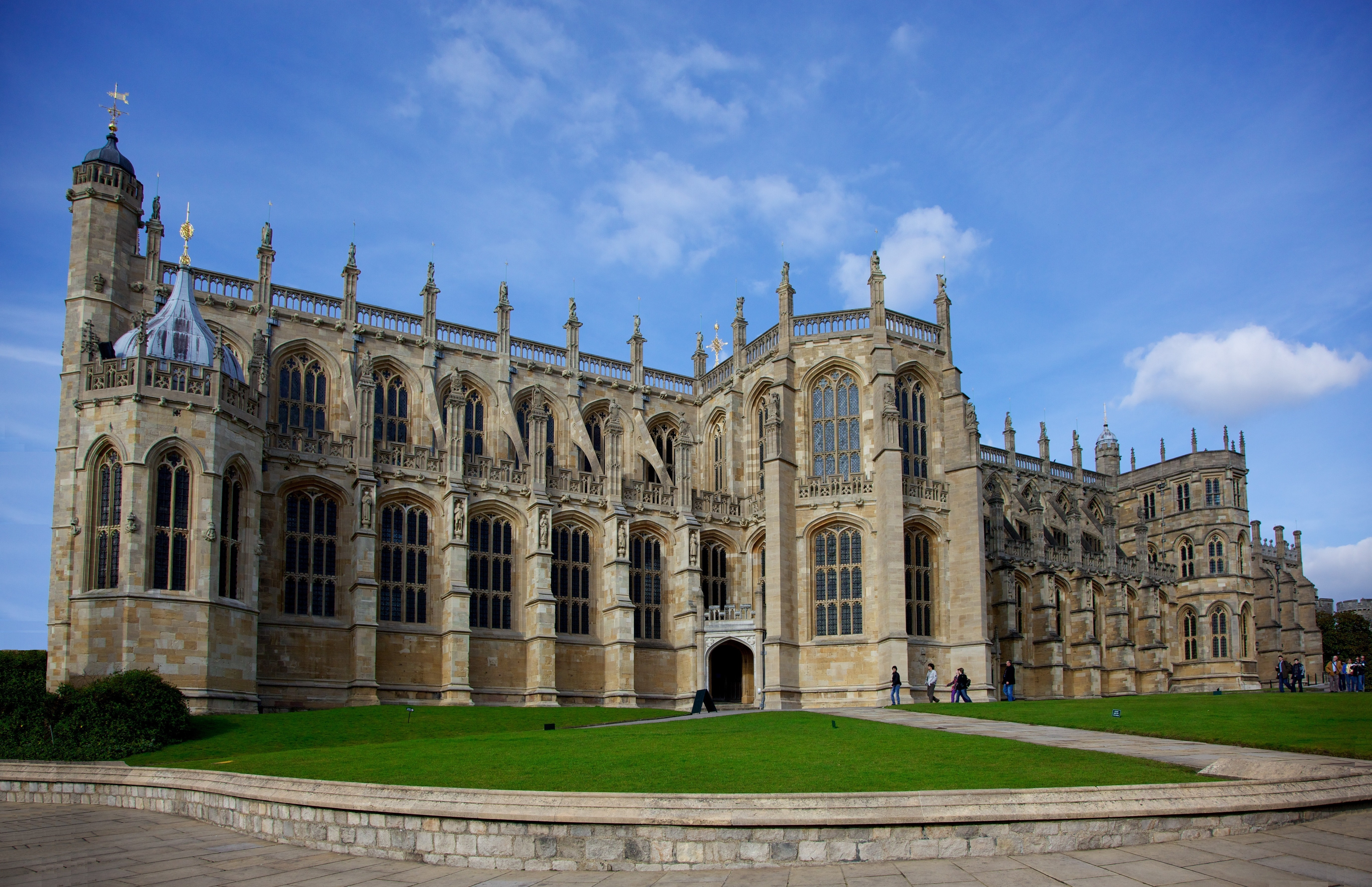
- St George's Chapel is located on the north side of the Lower Ward of Windsor Castle
- St George's Chapel, Windsor Castle
- 51°29′01″N 00°36′25″W
- OS grid reference: SU 96826 76992
- Location: Windsor
- Country: England
- Denomination: Church of England
- Previous denomination: Roman Catholicism
- Churchmanship: High Church
- Website: stgeorges-windsor.org

History
- Status: Chapel
- Founded: 1475
- Dedication: St George

Architecture
- Functional status: Active
- Heritage designation: Grade I listed
- Style: Gothic
- Years built: 1475
- Completed: 1511

Specifications
- Capacity: 800

Administration
- Diocese: Jurisdiction: Royal Peculiar; Location: Oxford
- Deanery: Dean and Canons of Windsor

Clergy
- Dean: Christopher Cocksworth

St George's Chapel, formally titled The King's Free Chapel of the College of St George, Windsor Castle, at Windsor Castle in England is a castle chapel built in the late-medieval Perpendicular Gothic style. It is a royal peculiar (a church under the direct jurisdiction of the monarch), and the Chapel of the Order of the Garter. St George's Chapel was founded in the 14th century by King Edward III and extensively enlarged in the late 15th century. It is located in the Lower Ward of the castle.

The castle has belonged to the monarchy for almost 1,000 years. The chapel has been the scene of many royal services, weddings and burials – in the 19th century, St George's Chapel and the nearby Frogmore Gardens superseded Westminster Abbey as the chosen burial place for the British royal family. The running of the chapel is the responsibility of the dean and canons of Windsor who make up the College of Saint George. They are assisted by a clerk, verger and other staff. The Society of the Friends of St George's and Descendants of the Knights of the Garter, a registered charity, was established in 1931 to assist the college in maintaining the chapel.

== History ==
=== Development of the building ===
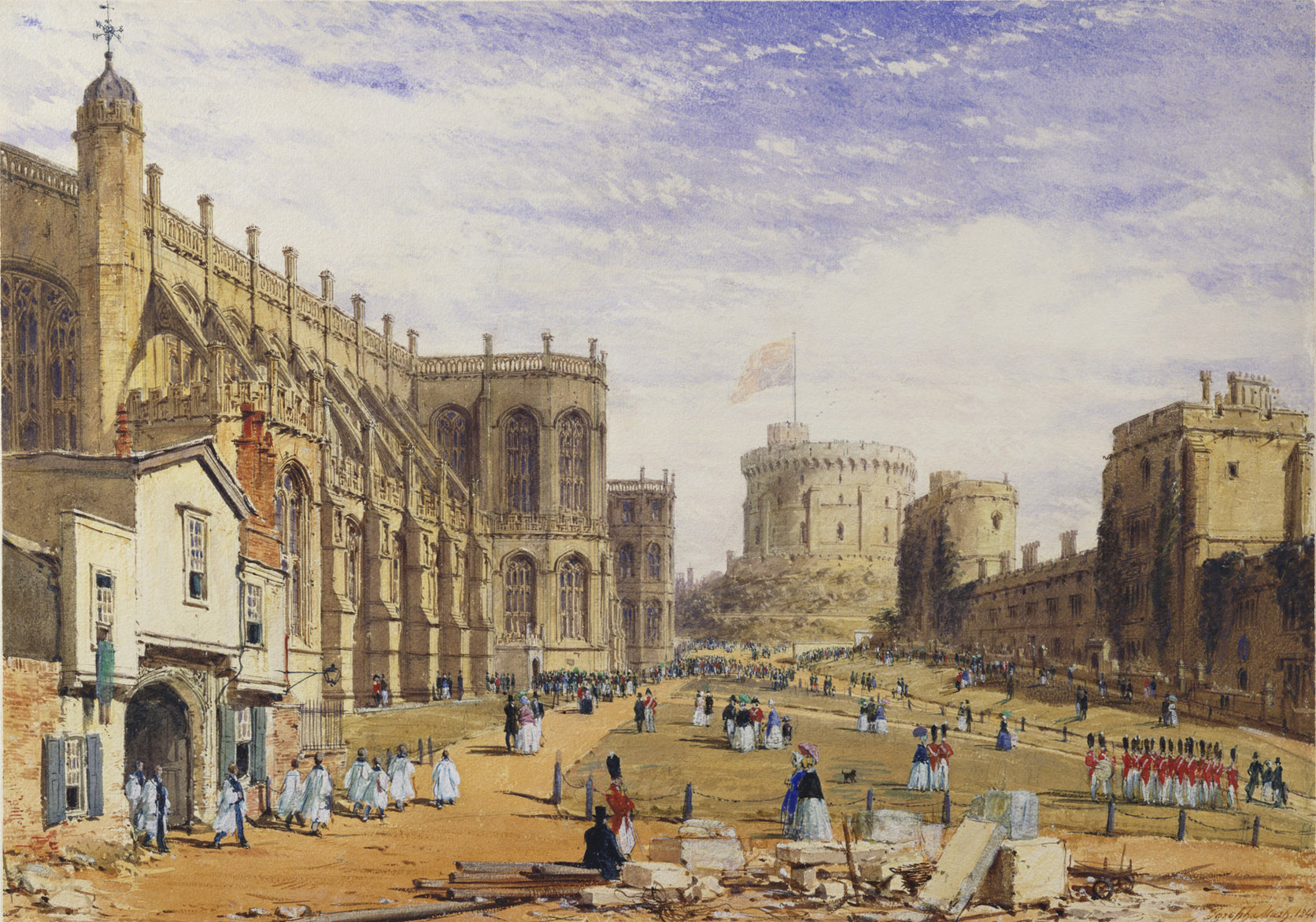
St George's Chapel (left) at Windsor Castle in 1848, showing the absence of the Queen's Beasts on the pinnacles (since replaced). Watercolour by Joseph Nash

In 1348, King Edward III founded two religious colleges: St Stephen's at Westminster and St George's at Windsor. The new college at Windsor was attached to the Chapel of St Edward the Confessor which had been constructed by Henry III in the early thirteenth century. The chapel was then re-dedicated to the Blessed Virgin Mary, George the Martyr and Edward the Confessor, but soon became known only by its dedication to St George. Edward III also built the Aerary Porch in 1353–54.

The period 1475–1528 saw a radical redevelopment of St George's Chapel set in motion by Edward IV and continued by Henry VII under the supervision of his most esteemed counsellor, Sir Reginald Bray, and by Henry VIII. The thirteenth-century Chapel of St Edward the Confessor was enlarged into a cathedral-like space under the direction of Richard Beauchamp, Bishop of Salisbury, and the master mason, Henry Janyns.

The Chapel suffered a great deal of destruction during the English Civil War. Parliamentary forces broke into and plundered the chapel and treasury on 23 October 1642. Further pillage occurred in 1643 when the fifteenth-century chapter house was destroyed, lead was stripped off the chapel roofs, and some elements of Henry VIII's unfinished funeral monument were stolen. In 1648 the metalwork was sold by the Commonwealth to pay for garrisoning Windsor Castle.

Following his execution in 1649, Charles I was buried in a small vault in the centre of the choir at St George's Chapel, which also contained the coffins of Henry VIII and Jane Seymour.

During his life and reign, King George III was responsible for reigniting royal interest in Windsor Castle, which had been much overlooked after the House of Hanover came to the throne of the Great Britain in 1714. On 12 August 1776 the royal family first attended the Sunday morning service at St George's Chapel – which they called "the Cathedral". George III was committed to St George's Chapel; he inspired and in large part funded an extensive restoration of the chapel from 1780 to 1790.

The reign of Queen Victoria saw further changes made to the structure of the chapel. The east end of the choir was reworked in memory of Prince Albert. The Lady Chapel, which had been abandoned by Henry VII, was completed and renamed the Albert Memorial Chapel.

By the early twentieth century, the bowing walls, cracked vaulting, decayed stone and stripped lead required urgent attention. In 1920 a much needed ten-year restoration project began at George's Chapel, overseen by the consulting architect Sir Harold Brakspear. As part of this programme, Mahomet Thomas Phillips – an Anglo-Congolese sculptor – produced a falcon and a unicorn in 1923.

The King George VI Memorial Chapel was constructed in 1969 between the Rutland Chapel and the north choir of St George's Chapel to a design by George Pace.

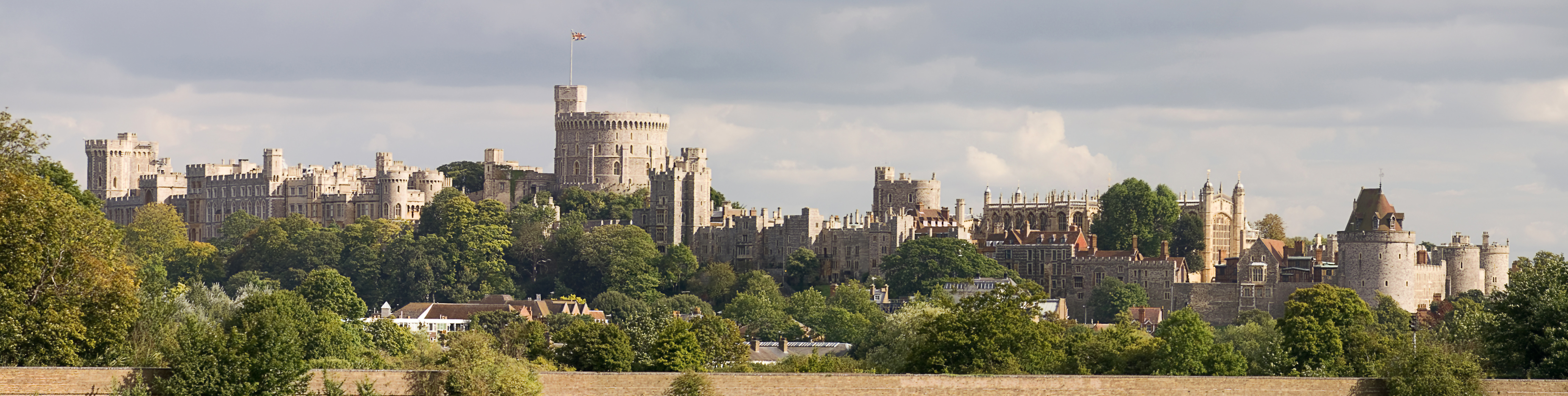
St George's Chapel in the Lower Ward at centre right, partially behind tree

=== The Royal Beasts ===
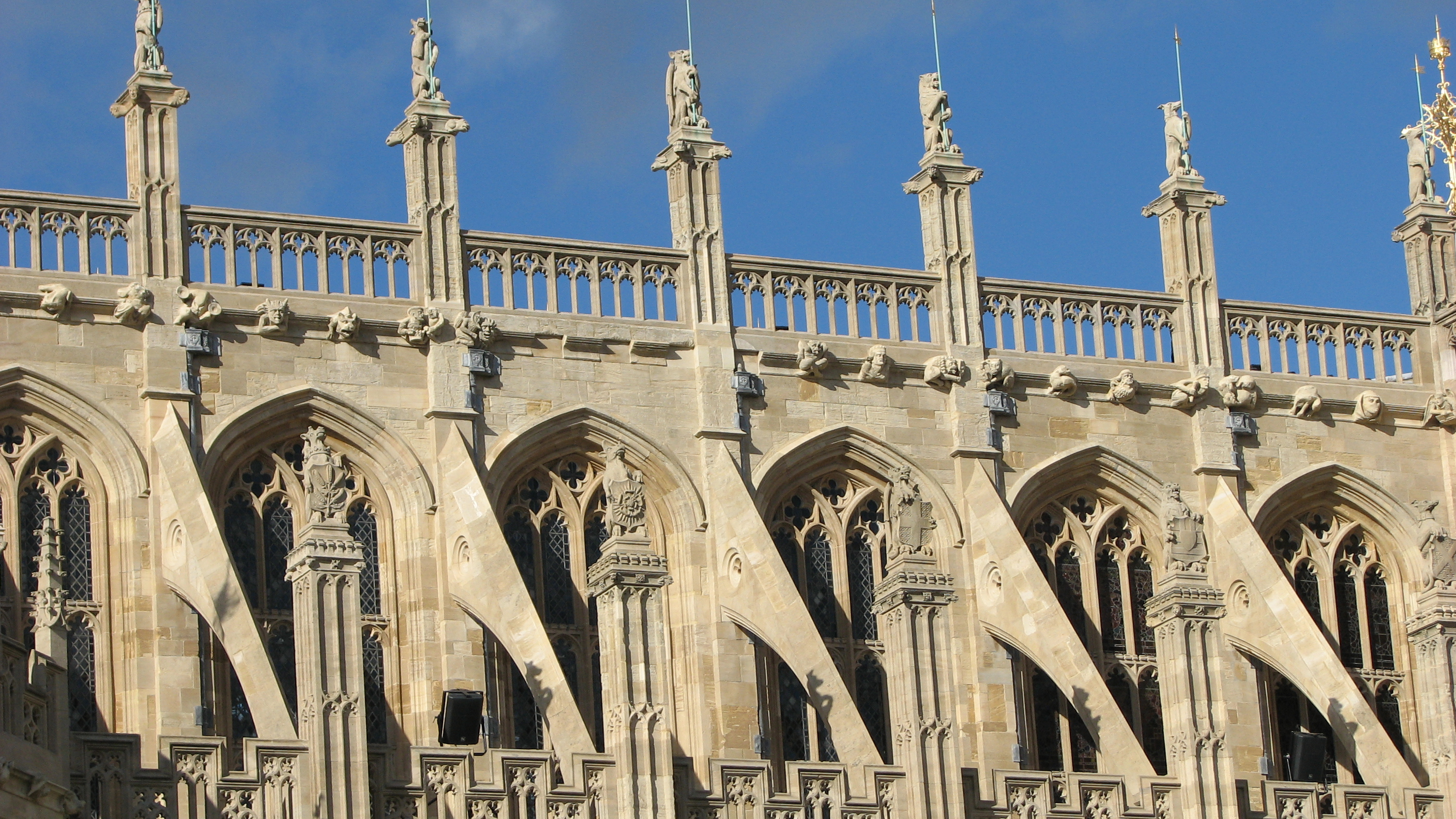
The Royal Beasts shown atop the pinnacles

On the roof of the chapel, standing on the pinnacles, and also on pinnacles at the sides, are seventy-six heraldic statues representing the Royal Beasts. They represent fourteen of the heraldic animals: the lion of England, the red dragon of Wales, the panther of Jane Seymour, the falcon of York, the black bull of Clarence, the yale of Beaufort, the white lion of Mortimer, the greyhound of Richmond, the white hart of Richard II, the collared silver antelope of Bohun, the black dragon of Ulster, the white swan of Hereford, the unicorn of Edward III and the golden hind of Kent.

The original beasts dated from the sixteenth century, but were removed in 1682 on the advice of Sir Christopher Wren. Wren had criticised the Reigate Stone, the calcareous sandstone from which they were constructed. The present statues date from 1925 when the chapel was restored.

=== The choir of St George's Chapel ===
The choristers of St George's Chapel are boarders at St George's School, Windsor Castle.

== Order of the Garter ==
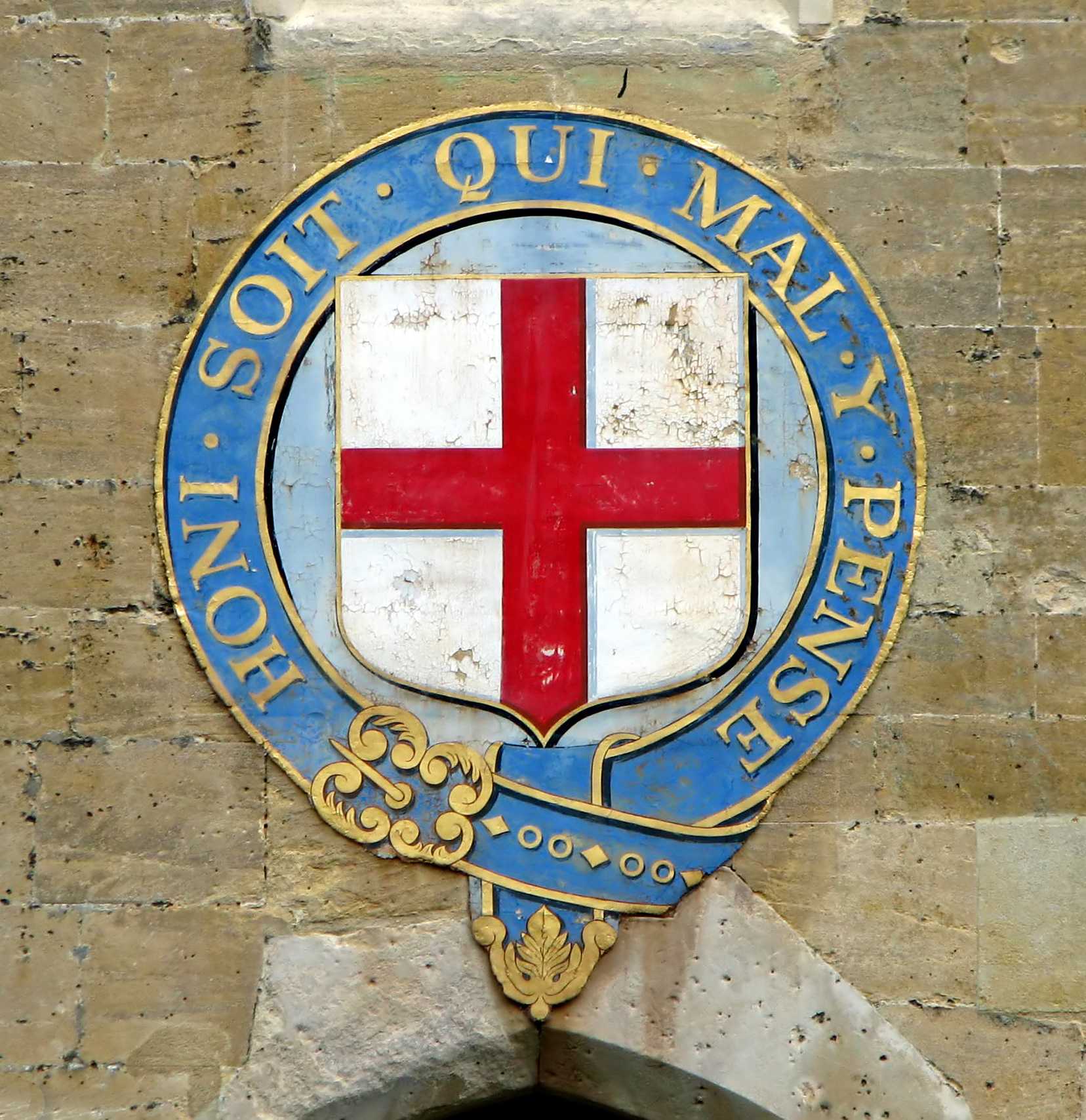
Emblem of the Order of the Garter

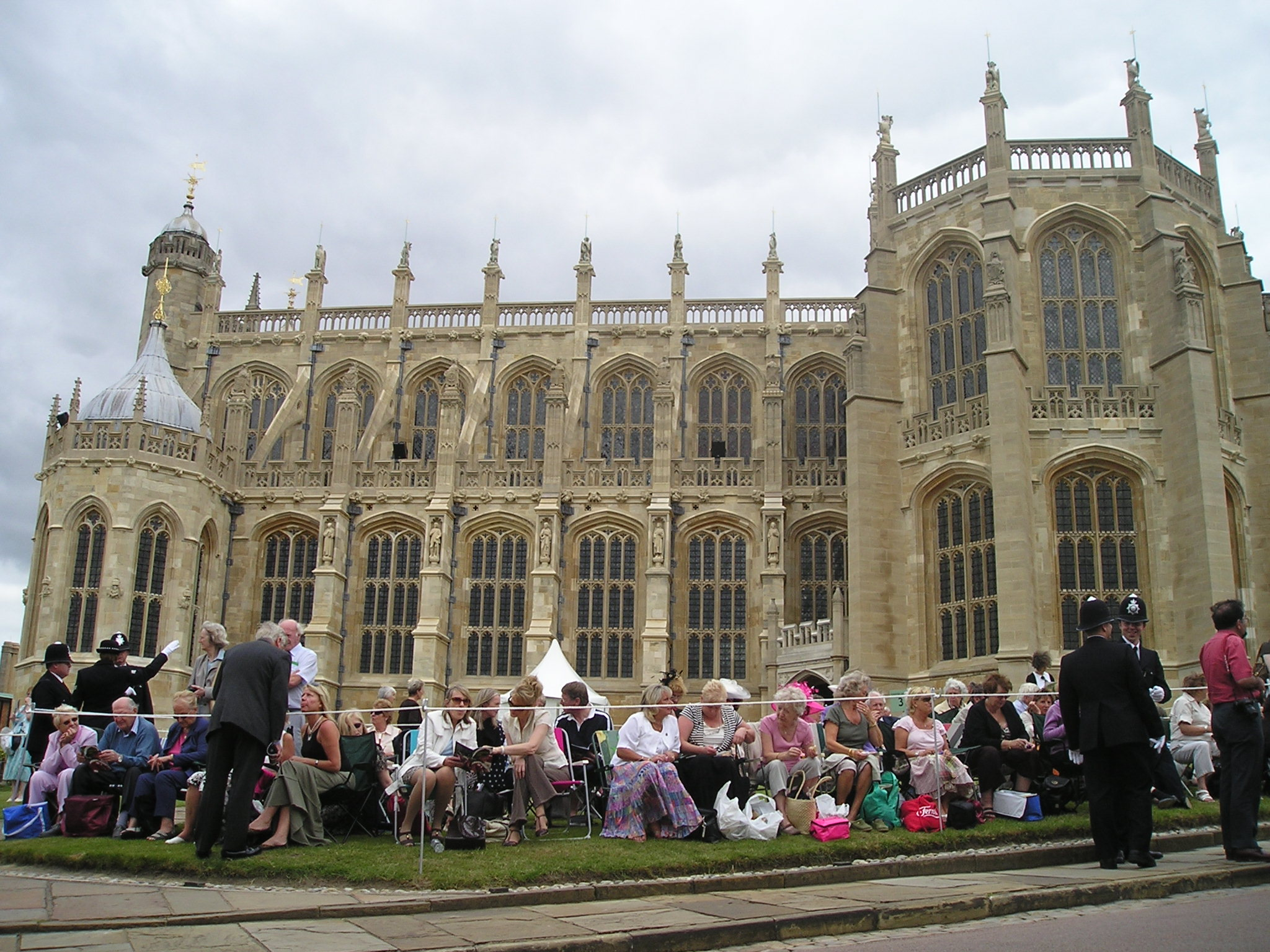
Members of the public outside St George's Chapel at Windsor Castle, waiting for the Garter Procession

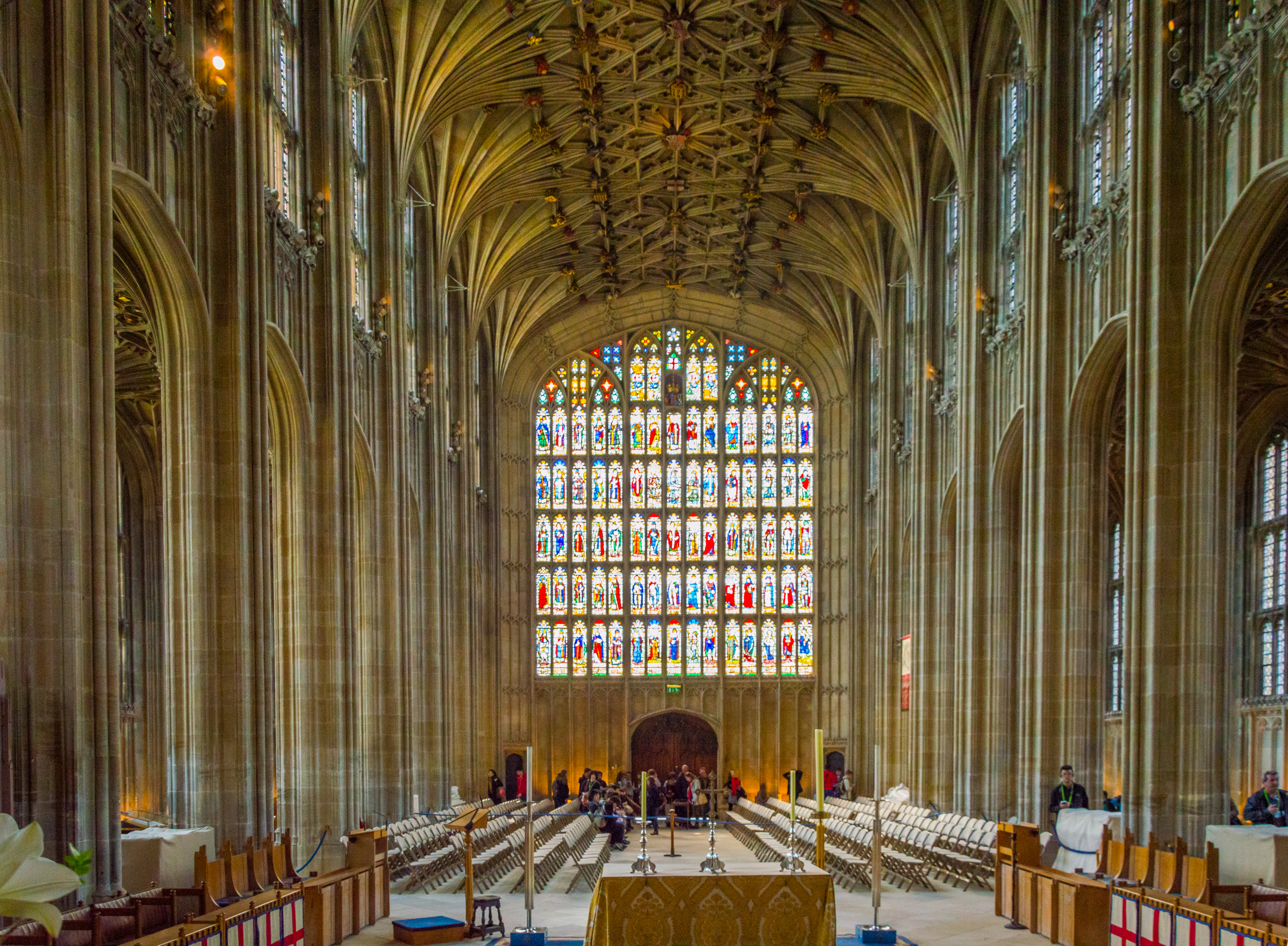
Interior of the chapel

=== Garter Service ===
Members of the Order of the Garter meet at Windsor Castle every June for the annual Garter Service. After lunch in the State Apartments (Upper Ward of the Castle), they process on foot in their robes and insignia, down to St George's Chapel for the service. The Garter Service was revived in 1948 by King George VI for the 600th anniversary of the founding of the Order and has since become an annual event.

=== Heraldry ===
After their installation, members are each assigned a stall in the chapel choir above which his or her heraldic devices are displayed. A member's sword is placed beneath a helmet which is decorated with a mantling and topped with a crest, coronet or crown. Above this, a member's heraldic banner is hoisted emblazoned with his arms.

A Garter stall plate, a small elaborately enamelled plate of brass, is affixed to the back of the stall displaying its member's name and arms with other inscriptions. On a member's death, the sword, helmet, mantling, crest, coronet or crown, and banner are removed. A service marking the death of a late member must be held before the stall can be assigned to anyone else. The ceremony takes place in the chapel, during which the Military Knights of Windsor carry the banner of the deceased member and offer it to the Dean of Windsor, who places it on the altar. The stall plates, however, are not removed. They remain permanently affixed to the stall, so the stalls of the chapel are emblazoned with a collection of 800 plates of the members throughout history.

== Chantries ==
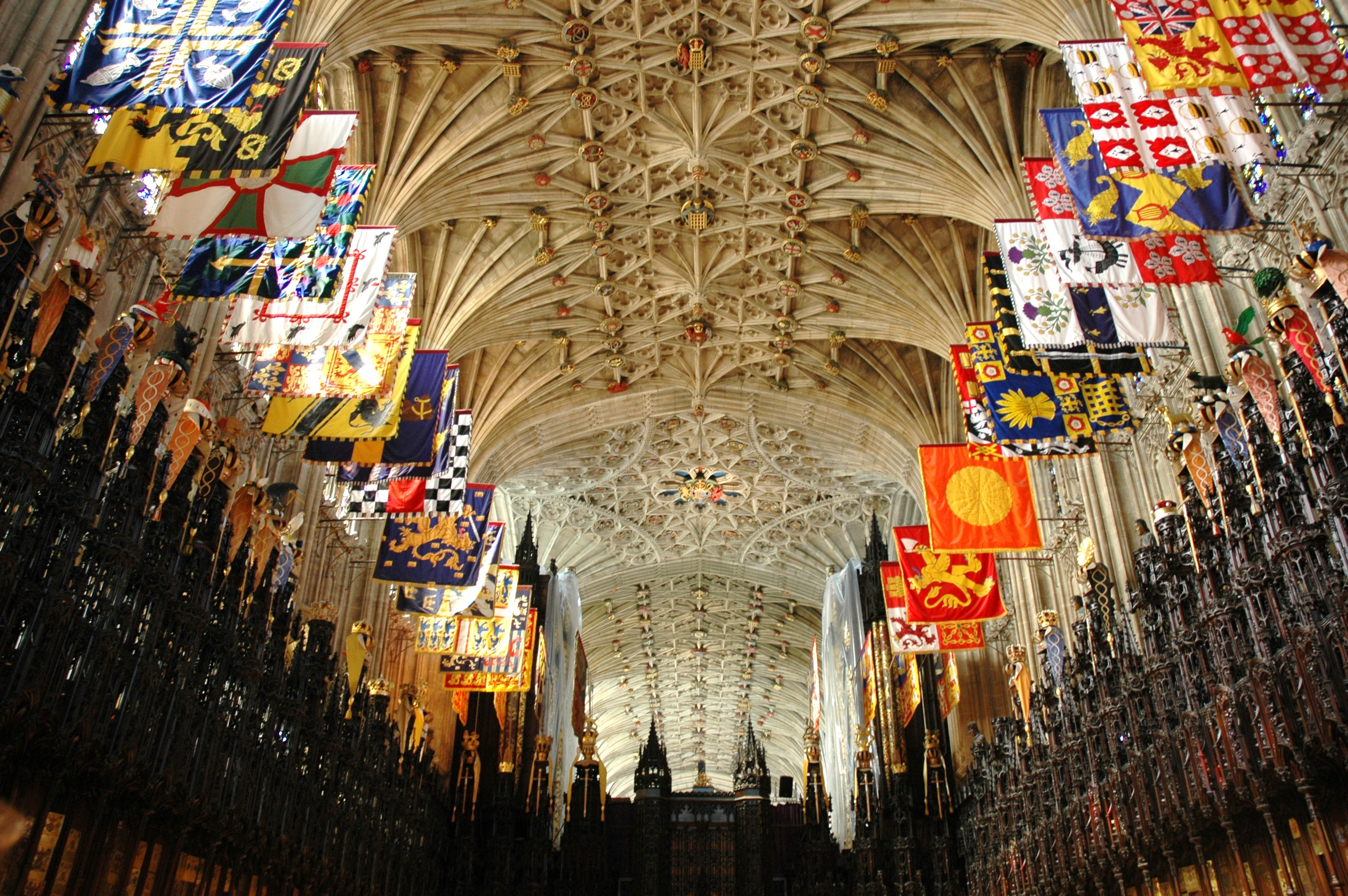
Tierceron-lierne vaulting of the choir and fan vaulting of the crossing of St George's Chapel, with the Garter banners on either side below

St George's Chapel is among the most important medieval chantry foundations to have survived in England. The college was itself part of a medieval chantry, and there are a number of other chantry elements in the form of altars and small chapels in memory of various English monarchs and of a number of prominent courtiers, deans and canons. Special services and prayers would also be offered in memory of the founder. Henry VIII had originally intended another chantry to be set up in the chapel, despite the fact that his ecclesiastical changes led to the Reformation in England and the eventual suppression of chantries.

The iron gates in the sanctuary of the chapel as well as the locks on the doors of the chapel are the work of the medieval Cornish metalsmith John Tresilian.

=== Rutland Chantry ===
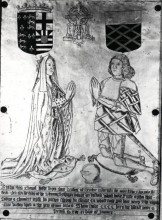
Monumental brass in St Leger Chantry to Anne of York (1439–1476) and her second husband Thomas St Leger (c. 1440 – 1483), founder of the chapel

The Rutland Chantry chapel, forming the northern transept of St George's Chapel, was founded in 1491 in honour of Sir Thomas St. Leger (c. 1440–1483) and Anne of York (1439–1476). Sir Thomas was Anne's second husband. She was the eldest surviving daughter of Richard Plantagenet, 3rd Duke of York, and thus elder sister of kings Edward IV (1442–1483) and Richard III (1452–1485). A monumental brass in memory of Anne and Sir Thomas survives on the east wall of the Rutland Chantry, the inscription of which records that the chantry was founded "with two priests singing forevermore":

"Wythin thys Chappell lyethe beryed Anne Duchess of Exetur suster unto the noble kyng Edward the forte. And also the body of syr Thomas Sellynger knyght her husband which hathe funde within thys College a Chauntre with too prestys sy’gyng for ev’more. On whose soule god have mercy. The wych Anne duchess dyed in the yere of oure lorde M Thowsande CCCCl xxv"

The chantry received its current name in honour of the earls of Rutland, descendants of Anne and Sir Thomas: their daughter, also Anne, married George Manners, 11th Baron Ros, and their son was Thomas Manners, 1st Earl of Rutland. The tomb of George and Anne Manners is a prominent feature of the chantry. Their effigies are carved in English alabaster.

The chantry comprises five panels which represent the Annunciation, the Visitation, the Adoration of the Magi, the Temptations of Christ in the wilderness and the Miracle at Cana. They were commissioned from embroiderer Beryl Dean and took five years to complete. Only one panel is normally on display to the public, but the others may be seen on request.

== Weddings ==
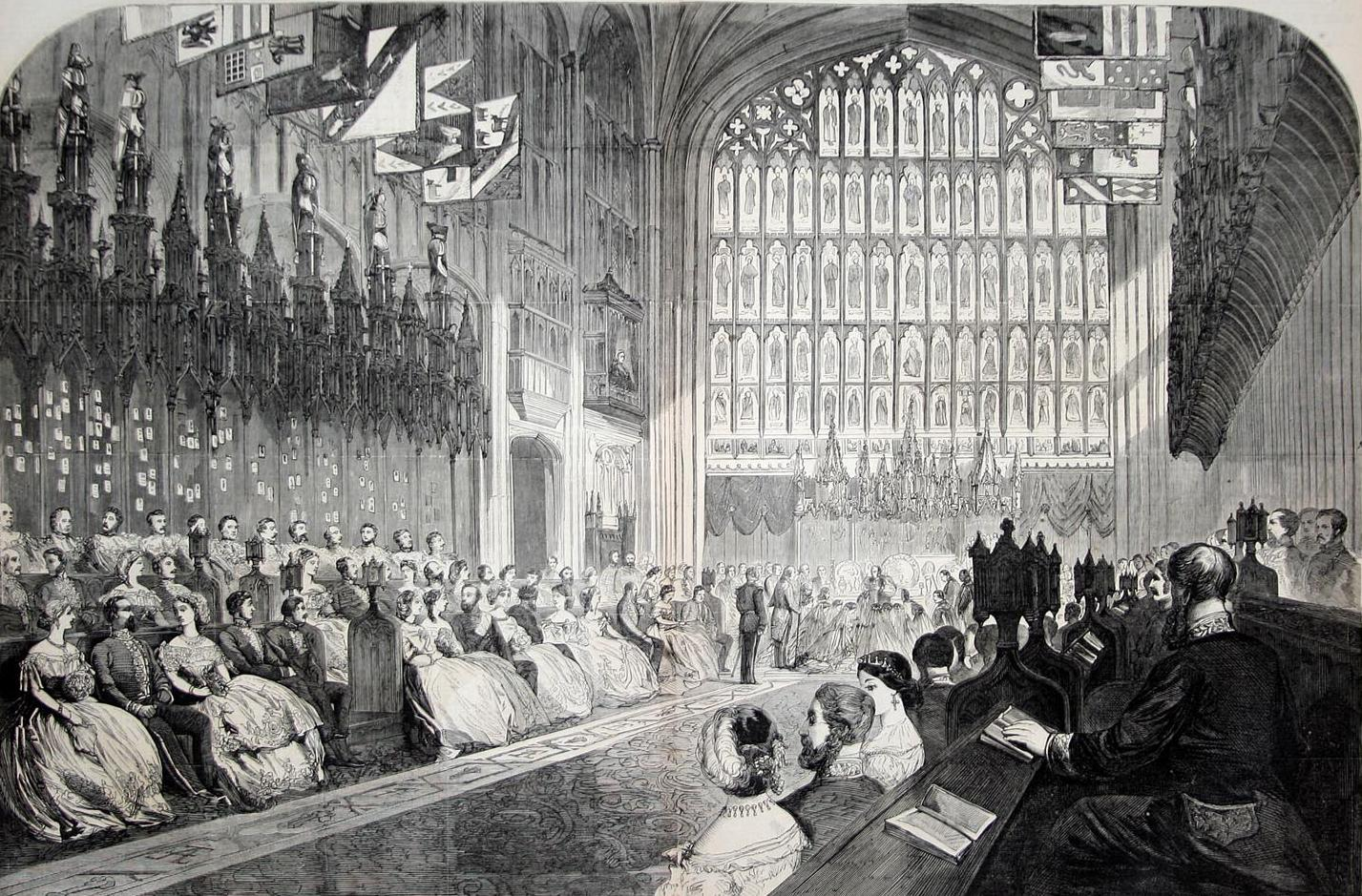
Wedding of the Prince of Wales and Alexandra of Denmark, in 1863

The chapel has been the site of many royal weddings, particularly of the children of Queen Victoria. They have included:

Year	Groom	Bride
1863	Albert Edward, Prince of Wales	Princess Alexandra of Denmark
1866	Prince Christian of Schleswig-Holstein	Princess Helena
1871	John Campbell, Marquess of Lorne	Princess Louise
1879	Prince Arthur, Duke of Connaught and Strathearn	Princess Louise Margaret of Prussia
1880	Alphons, Baron von Pawel-Rammingen	Princess Frederica of Hanover
1882	Prince Leopold, Duke of Albany	Princess Helen of Waldeck and Pyrmont
1891	Prince Aribert of Anhalt	Princess Marie Louise of Schleswig-Holstein
1904	Prince Alexander of Teck	Princess Alice of Albany
1905	Prince Gustaf Adolf of Sweden	Princess Margaret of Connaught
1919	Major John Gibbs	Lady Helena Cambridge
1957	David Liddell-Grainger	Anne Abel Smith
1992	Timothy Taylor	Lady Helen Windsor
1999	Prince Edward, Earl of Wessex	Sophie Rhys-Jones
2008	Peter Phillips	Autumn Kelly
2018	Prince Harry, Duke of Sussex	Meghan Markle
2018	Jack Brooksbank	Princess Eugenie of York
2019	Thomas Kingston	Lady Gabriella Windsor

Charles III, then-Prince of Wales, and Queen Camilla, then-Duchess of Cornwall received a blessing from the Archbishop of Canterbury following their marriage in 2005.

== Burials ==
The chapel has been the site of many royal funerals and interments. People interred in the Chapel include:

=== Altar ===
- George Plantagenet, Duke of Bedford, on 22 March 1479; son of Edward IV and Elizabeth Woodville
- Mary of York, in 1482; daughter of Edward IV and Elizabeth Woodville
- Edward IV, King of England, in 1483
- Henry VI, King of England, in 1484 (reburial from Chertsey Abbey)
- The coffins of two unidentified children suggested to be the Princes in the Tower (Edward V, King of England and Richard of Shrewsbury, Duke of York); sons of Edward IV and Elizabeth Woodville
- Elizabeth Woodville, Queen of England, on 12 June 1492; wife of Edward IV
- Princess Louise of Saxe-Weimar-Eisenach, in 1832; niece of Adelaide of Saxe-Meiningen
- Edward VII, King of the United Kingdom and Emperor of India, on 20 May 1910 (originally interred in the Royal Vault)
- Alexandra of Denmark, Queen of the United Kingdom and Empress of India, on 28 November 1925 (originally interred in the Royal Vault); wife of Edward VII

=== Quire ===
- Jane Seymour, Queen of England, in 1537; third wife of Henry VIII
- Henry VIII, King of England and Ireland, in 1547
- Charles I, King of England, Scotland and Ireland, in 1649
- Stillborn son of Anne, Queen of Great Britain and Prince George of Denmark, in 1698

=== Royal Vault ===
- Princess Amelia of the United Kingdom, in 1810; daughter of George III and Charlotte of Mecklenburg-Strelitz
- Princess Augusta of Great Britain, Duchess of Brunswick-Lünenburg, in 1813; daughter of Frederick, Prince of Wales and Princess Augusta of Saxe-Gotha-Altenburg
- Princess Charlotte of Wales, in 1817; daughter of George IV and Caroline of Brunswick-Wolfenbüttel
- Stillborn son of Princess Charlotte of Wales and Prince Leopold of Saxe-Coburg-Saalfeld, in 1817
- Charlotte of Mecklenburg-Strelitz, Queen of the United Kingdom and Hanover, in 1818; wife of George III
- Stillborn daughter of Ernest Augustus, King of Hanover and Frederica of Mecklenburg-Strelitz, in 1818
- George III, King of the United Kingdom and Hanover, in 1820
- Prince Edward, Duke of Kent and Strathearn, in 1820; son of George III and Charlotte of Mecklenburg-Strelitz, father of Victoria, Queen of the United Kingdom
- Prince Alfred of Great Britain, in 1820 (reburial); son of George III and Charlotte of Mecklenburg-Strelitz
- Prince Octavius of Great Britain, in 1820 (reburial); son of George III and Charlotte of Mecklenburg-Strelitz
- Princess Elizabeth of Clarence, in 1821; daughter of William IV and Adelaide of Saxe-Meiningen
- Prince Frederick, Duke of York and Albany, in 1827; son of George III and Charlotte of Mecklenburg-Strelitz
- George IV, King of the United Kingdom and Hanover, in 1830
- William IV, King of the United Kingdom and Hanover, in 1837
- Princess Augusta Sophia of the United Kingdom, in 1840; daughter of George III and Charlotte of Mecklenburg-Strelitz
- Adelaide of Saxe-Meiningen, Queen of the United Kingdom and Hanover, in 1849; wife of William IV
- George V of Hanover, in 1878; grandson of George III and Charlotte of Mecklenburg-Strelitz
- Baroness Victoria von Pawel-Rammingen, in 1881; daughter of Princess Frederica of Hanover and Alphons, Baron von Pawel-Rammingen
- Princess Mary Adelaide of Cambridge, Duchess of Teck, in 1897; daughter of Prince Adolphus, Duke of Cambridge and Princess Augusta of Hesse-Kassel, mother of Mary of Teck
- Francis, Duke of Teck, in 1900; father of Mary of Teck
- Princess Frederica of Hanover, Baroness von Pawel-Rammingen, in 1926; daughter of George V, King of Hanover, and Marie of Saxe-Altenburg
- Prince Adolphus, Duke of Cambridge, in 1930 (reburial); son of George III and Charlotte of Mecklenburg-Strelitz
- Princess Augusta of Hesse-Kassel, Duchess of Cambridge, in 1930 (reburial); wife of Prince Adolphus, Duke of Cambridge

=== Near West Door ===
- George V, King of the United Kingdom and Emperor of India, in 1936 (originally interred in the Royal Vault)
- Mary of Teck, Queen of the United Kingdom and Empress of India, in 1953; wife of George V

=== King George VI Memorial Chapel ===
- George VI, King of the United Kingdom, Emperor of India and Head of the Commonwealth, on 26 March 1969 (originally interred in the Royal Vault on 15 February 1952, and moved to the chapel following its construction)
- Princess Margaret, Countess of Snowdon, in 2002; daughter of George VI and Elizabeth Bowes-Lyon (ashes buried here after cremation in Slough)
- Elizabeth Bowes-Lyon, Queen of the United Kingdom and Empress of India, in 2002; wife of George VI
- Prince Philip, Duke of Edinburgh, in 2022 (originally interred in the Royal Vault in 2021 and moved to the chapel upon his wife's death); husband of Elizabeth II
- Elizabeth II, Queen of the United Kingdom and Head of the Commonwealth, in 2022

=== Albert Memorial Chapel ===
- Prince Leopold, Duke of Albany, in 1884 (originally interred in the Royal Vault); son of Victoria, Queen of the United Kingdom and Prince Albert of Saxe-Coburg and Gotha
- Prince Albert Victor, Duke of Clarence and Avondale, in 1892 (originally interred in the Royal Vault); son of Edward VII and Alexandra of Denmark

=== Gloucester Vault ===
- Prince William Henry, Duke of Gloucester and Edinburgh, in 1805; son of Frederick, Prince of Wales and Princess Augusta of Saxe-Gotha-Altenburg
- Maria Walpole, Duchess of Gloucester and Edinburgh, in 1807; wife of Prince William Henry, Duke of Gloucester and Edinburgh
- Prince William Frederick, Duke of Gloucester and Edinburgh, in 1834; son of Prince William Henry, Duke of Gloucester and Edinburgh and Maria Walpole
- Princess Sophia of Gloucester, in 1844; daughter of Prince William Henry, Duke of Gloucester and Edinburgh and Maria Walpole
- Princess Mary of the United Kingdom, Duchess of Gloucester and Edinburgh, in 1857; daughter of George III and Charlotte of Mecklenburg-Strelitz, wife of Prince William Frederick, Duke of Gloucester and Edinburgh

=== Others ===
- William Hastings, 1st Baron Hastings, in the north aisle; close friend of Edward IV
- Anne Manners (née St Leger), Baroness de Ros, in the private Rutland Chapel; niece of Edward IV and Richard III
- George Manners, 11th Baron de Ros, in the private Rutland Chapel; husband of Anne St Leger
- Charles Brandon, 1st Duke of Suffolk, in 1545; second husband of Mary Tudor
- Christopher Villiers, 1st Earl of Anglesey, in 1631
- Henry Somerset, 1st Duke of Beaufort and his ancestors in the private Beaufort Chapel (the original monument by Grinling Gibbons was moved to St Michael and All Angels Church, Badminton in 1878)
- Peniston Booth, Dean of Windsor
- Lieutenant-General Sir John Elley, in the north quire aisle; commoner who distinguished himself at the Battle of Waterloo
- Dejazmatch Alemayehu Tewodros, on 21 November 1879; son of Tewodros II, Emperor of Ethiopia

=== Former burials ===
- Princess Victoria of Saxe-Coburg-Saalfeld, Duchess of Kent and Strathearn, in 1861; mother of Victoria, Queen of the United Kingdom – moved to the Duchess of Kent's Mausoleum later that year
- Prince Albert of Saxe-Coburg and Gotha, Prince Consort, in 1861; husband of Victoria, Queen of the United Kingdom – moved to the Frogmore Royal Mausoleum in 1862
- Prince Harald of Schleswig-Holstein, in 1876; son of Princess Helena of the United Kingdom and Prince Christian of Schleswig-Holstein – moved to the Frogmore Royal Burial Ground in 1928
- Prince Francis of Teck, in 1910; brother of Mary of Teck – moved to the Frogmore Royal Burial Ground in 1928
- Alexander Duff, 1st Duke of Fife, in 1912; husband of Louise, Princess Royal – moved to St Ninian's Chapel, Braemar later that year
- Princess Louise Margaret of Prussia, Duchess of Connaught and Strathearn, in 1917; wife of Prince Arthur, Duke of Connaught and Strathearn – moved to the Frogmore Royal Burial Ground in 1928
- Prince Christian of Schleswig-Holstein, in 1917; husband of Princess Helena of the United Kingdom – moved to the Frogmore Royal Burial Ground in 1928
- Lord Leopold Mountbatten (formerly Prince Leopold of Battenberg), in 1922; son of Princess Beatrice of the United Kingdom and Prince Henry of Battenberg – moved to the Frogmore Royal Burial Ground in 1928
- Princess Helena of the United Kingdom, Princess Christian of Schleswig-Holstein, in 1923; daughter of Victoria, Queen of the United Kingdom and Prince Albert of Saxe-Coburg and Gotha – moved to the Frogmore Royal Burial Ground in 1928
- Lieutenant-Colonel Adolphus Cambridge, 1st Marquess of Cambridge (formerly Adolphus, Duke of Teck), in 1927; brother of Mary of Teck – moved to the Frogmore Royal Burial Ground in 1928
- Rupert Cambridge, Viscount Trematon (formerly Prince Rupert of Teck), in 1928; son of Alexander Cambridge, 1st Earl of Athlone (formerly Prince Alexander of Teck) and Princess Alice of Albany – moved to the Frogmore Royal Burial Ground later that year
- Louise, Princess Royal and Duchess of Fife, in 1931; daughter of Edward VII and Alexandra of Denmark – moved to St Ninian's Chapel, Braemar later that year
- Princess Victoria of the United Kingdom, in 1935; daughter of Edward VII and Alexandra of Denmark – moved to the Frogmore Royal Burial Ground in 1936
- Prince Arthur of Connaught, in 1938; son of Prince Arthur, Duke of Connaught and Strathearn and Princess Louise Margaret of Prussia – moved to the Frogmore Royal Burial Ground in 1939
- Princess Louise of the United Kingdom, Duchess of Argyll, in 1939 (ashes); daughter of Victoria, Queen of the United Kingdom and Prince Albert of Saxe-Coburg and Gotha – moved to the Frogmore Royal Burial Ground in 1940
- Prince Arthur, Duke of Connaught and Strathearn, in 1942; son of Victoria, Queen of the United Kingdom and Prince Albert of Saxe-Coburg and Gotha – moved to the Frogmore Royal Burial Ground in 1942
- Prince George, Duke of Kent, in 1942; son of George V and Mary of Teck – moved to Frogmore Royal Burial Ground in 1968
- Princess Beatrice of the United Kingdom, Princess Henry of Battenberg, in 1944; daughter of Victoria, Queen of the United Kingdom and Prince Albert of Saxe-Coburg and Gotha – moved to St Mildred's Church, Whippingham in 1945
- Princess Helena Victoria of Schleswig-Holstein, in 1948; daughter of Princess Helena of the United Kingdom and Prince Christian of Schleswig-Holstein – moved to the Frogmore Royal Burial Ground in 1948
- Princess Marie Louise of Schleswig-Holstein (formerly Princess Aribert of Anhalt), in 1956; daughter of Princess Helena of the United Kingdom and Prince Christian of Schleswig-Holstein – moved to the Frogmore Royal Burial Ground in 1957
- Major-General Alexander Cambridge, 1st Earl of Athlone (formerly Prince Alexander of Teck), in 1957; brother of Mary of Teck – moved to the Frogmore Royal Burial Ground later that year
- Princess Alice of Battenberg, Princess Andrew of Greece and Denmark, in 1969; mother of Prince Philip, Duke of Edinburgh – moved to Church of Mary Magdalene in Jerusalem, in 1988

== In literature ==
- Wenceslaus Hollar. View and Ground Plan of St. George's Chapel, Windsor c. 1671.
- John Henry Le Keux. St. George's Chapel, Windsor. Ground Plan 1810. Engraved after a plan by F. Mackenzie, published in Britton's Architectural antiquities of Great Britain, 1807. Copper-engraved antique plan.

== See also ==
- Choir of St George's Chapel, Windsor Castle
- Dean of Windsor
- Dean and Canons of Windsor
- Francis Eginton (artist, painted the arms of the knights of the Garter for two Gothic windows in the stalls)
- List of knights and ladies of the Garter
- Order of the Garter
- Saint George in devotions, traditions and prayers
- The Society of the Friends of St George's and Descendants of the Knights of the Garter
- Windsor Castle
- Historical monographs relating to St. George's Chapel, Windsor Castle
- Royal Chapel of All Saints (chapel in Windsor Great Park closely connected with St George's Chapel)
