= John St Leger (died 1441) =

High Sheriff of Kent

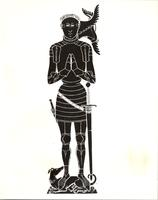
Rubbing of monumental brass of John St Leger (died 1441), All Saints Church, Ulcombe

Arms of St Leger: Azure fretty argent, a chief or

Sir John St Leger (died 1441) of Ulcombe in Kent, was Sheriff of Kent in 1430 and 1433.

== Family ==
He was a son of Arnold St Leger, of Ulcombe, MP for Kent.

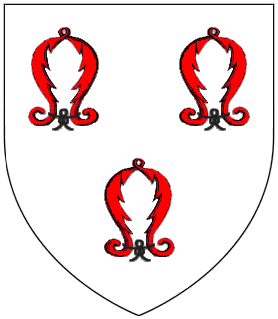
Arms of Danet: Argent, three pairs of barnacles gules tied sable. As seen on the Garter stall plate of his great-grandson Sir Anthony St Leger (died 1559), KG

He married Margery Danet, daughter and heiress of James Donet (died 1409) of Silham in the parish of Rainham, Kent, by whom he had children including:

- Ralph St Leger (died 1470) (alias Randolf, etc.), eldest son and heir, of Ulcombe, Sheriff of Kent in 1467/8 and Constable of Leeds Castle in Kent, grandfather of Sir Anthony St Leger (died 1559), KG, Lord Deputy of Ireland and ancestor of the St Leger Viscounts Doneraile.
- Sir Thomas St Leger (c. 1440 – 1483) second husband of Anne of York (1439–1476), daughter of Richard Plantagenet, 3rd Duke of York (by his wife Cecily Neville) and thus an elder sister of Kings Edward IV (1461–1483) and Richard III (1483–1485). He was grandfather to Thomas Manners, 1st Earl of Rutland.
- Sir James St Leger (c. 1441 – 1509), of Annery in Devon, who married Anne Butler, a daughter of Thomas Butler, 7th Earl of Ormond, great-aunt of Queen Anne Boleyn and heiress of Annery. His small inscribed monumental brass survives in the Annery Chapel of Monkleigh Church, inscribed as follows: Orate pro a(n)i(m)a Jacobie Seyntleg(er)b Armig(eri) qui obiit viii^{0} die me(n)sis Februarii Anno D(o)m(ino) MCCCCC^{0} IX^{0} cui(us) a(n)i(mae) p(rop)iciet(ur) De(us) Amen ("Pray ye for the soul of James St Leger, Esquire, who died on the 8th day of the month of February in the year of Our Lord 1500th and 9th of whose soul may God look upon with favour Amen"). Below is a very worn brass of an escutcheon showing the arms of St Leger. His grandson was Sir John St Leger (died 1596) of Annery, Sheriff of Devon in 1560, Member of Parliament.
- Bartholomew St Leger, mentioned in his father's will, "I will they enfeoff Bartholomew my son when 21 or at marriage of and in the manors of Eylnothynighton and Eylnothyng-tonesdowne with appurtenances and in one tenement called Pendecourte with appurtenances in Holingborne and in all other lands and tenements in Holyngbourne to him and his heirs males". He was one of the leading rebels included in Lord Scrope's indictment at Great Torrington, November 1483, Scrope having been given a commission by King Richard III to hold a sessions in Devon to examine the loyalty of the gentlemen of Devon to the crown, as opposed to his rival the Earl of Richmond, the future King Henry VII. At this court many of the gentry of Devon were indicted of high treason, many fled to Brittany to join the Earl, but two were captured and beheaded in Exeter, namely Thomas St Leger and Sir John Kame. He married (secondly?) Blanche Bourchier (died 1483), of whom a stone effigy exists in Shirwell Church, Devon, widow of Philip Beaumont (1432–1473) of Shirwell in North Devon and of Gittisham in East Devon, a member of parliament for a constituency in Devon and Sheriff of Devon in 1469, and a daughter of William Bourchier, 9th Baron FitzWarin (1407–1470) of Tawstock, feudal baron of Bampton and heir to a moiety of the feudal barony of Barnstaple, both in Devon. One of the daughters and co-heiresses of Bartholomew St Leger was Margaret St Leger, first wife of John Copleston (1475–1550), "The Great Copleston", of Copleston, Devon.
- Margaret St Leger, wife of John de Clinton, 5th Baron Clinton of Maxstoke.

== Death and burial ==
He died in 1441 and was buried in the chapel of St Thomas the Martyr in the parish church of Ulcombe, as he requested in his will. His Latin will dated 12 December 1441 survives in the records of the Prerogative Court of Canterbury.

A fragment of his monumental brass survives in Ulcombe Church, now displayed as a mural in the north aisle. The inscription is lost, but is said to have been: Here lyeth John Seintleger Esquyer, and Margerie his wyfe, sole daughter and heir of James Donnett ... 1442. A rubbing showing the date 1442 survives in the collection of the Society of Antiquaries.

== Sources ==
- Hasted, Edward, History and Topographical Survey of the County of Kent: Volume 5, 1798, pp.385–396, Manor of Ulcombe
- Richardson, Douglas (2011). Everingham, Kimball G. (ed.). Magna Carta Ancestry: A Study in Colonial and Medieval Families. Vol. III (2nd ed.). Salt Lake City. pp. 216–17, 481. ISBN 978-1449966393.
- Robertson, Herbert (1893–95). Stemmata Robertson et Durdin. London: Mitchell and Hughes. pp. 70–1. ISBN 978-1-84383-614-8.
