= John Tresilian =

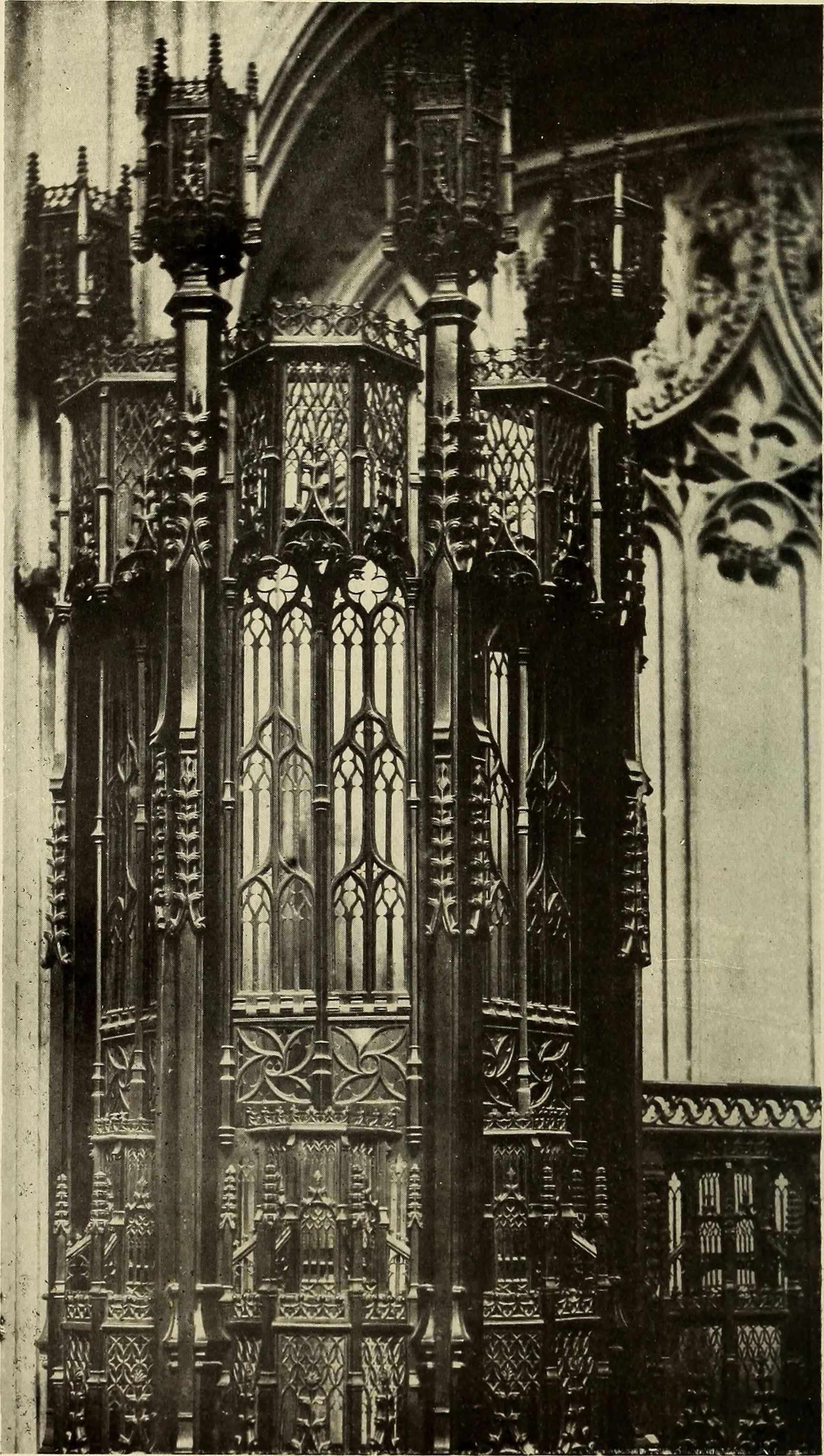
Upper part of a gate pier, St. George's Chapel, Windsor, by John Tresilian (end of 15th century)

John Tresilian (c. 1450 – after 1515) was a British master smith who worked for Edward IV of England.

All we know about Tresilian comes through few documents in Windsor Castle and his surviving handiwork. His name is Cornish but the dates of his birth and death unclear.

According to official documents, John Tresilian was a "principal smith" that worked in Windsor Castle from 1477 to 1484. His annual wage was £24 5s or 16 pence a day. Documents mention him in connection to a 1479 creation of a large anvil that was brought to Windsor. In the King's Book of Payments for the year 1515 Tresilian was paid 30s 5d for clockmaking. He probably died within a couple of years. His successor was Anthony Trassillion, who might have been his son.

Other clues are based on his unique handiwork. Based on the craftsmanship, Tresilian was involved with making gates to Edward IVs tomb and suite of door furniture for his chantry at St. George's Chapel, Windsor, between 1477 and 1484. Before 1841 these had been attributed to Brabant painter Quentin Metsys (who lived from 1466 to 1530). Tresilian's other works would be the lock and ring plates to the door of Edward IVs chantry, the lock plates originally on the north and south sides of the choir and Henry VI offertory.
