= Will St Leger =

Artist living in Ireland

Will St Leger is a street artist/artivist, Radio DJ and gay rights activist living in Dublin, Ireland.

== Activism ==
A former Greenpeace activist St Leger has been involved in activism for many years. In 2009, St Leger co founded an LGBT direct action group, 'Equals'. - On 25 June 2009 the group staged a direct action at entrance of the Dáil (Irish Parliament) in Dublin. The group demonstrated their discontent with what they see as the inequality in the Civil Partnerships Bill 2009, by chaining themselves to the gates of the building. St Leger climbed onto the pillars of gates and remained there for over 2 hours and was subsequently arrested by police. Although initially charged, St Leger was not prosecuted.

== Art ==
"Landmine Trail" in Merrion Square, Dublin. 2007.

'Landmine Trail': On Sunday 1 April 2007. he placed 100 fake 'landmines' made from stencilled enamel plates in five parks around Dublin, Ireland. In an interview with Wooster Collective he said, "The reason for doing this was to get people asking themselves, 'what if the world I walked in was littered with landmines?'"

'Art Raid': In 2007, St Leger premiered an exhibition at Dublin Fringe Festival where guests were permitted to 'steal' the art on display at the sound of a security alarm.

'Bertie cash giveaway': On 31 March 2008. St Leger placed £50,000 worth of fake 'Bertie' bills depicting Irish Taoiseach, Bertie Ahern on the statue of Molly Malone in Dublin, Ireland. The artist claimed that the money which also depicts an excavator tipping Celtic art into a waste skip were in protest to the N3 road's incursion of the Hill of Tara.

== Solo shows ==
Artivism, February 2006
Celebrity Guns & Ammo, April 2007
Art Raid, September 2007/April 2008
Antics Rogue Show, September 2008
Bluetooth Fairy, November 2009
Cause & Effect, November 2012

== Radio and music ==
From January 2012 to March 2014, St Leger was a radio presenter with Phantom 105.2 where he presented a four-hour weekly show called 'The Weekender'
St Leger is also co-founder electronic duo, 'Faune' who released their first single in March 2014.
