= Thomas St Leger =

Irish religious figure

Thomas St Leger, Archdeacon of Kells, was the son of Ralph St. Leger, of a long established Anglo-Norman family; his mother belonged to the de Malemains family. He was elected Bishop of Meath before 5 November 1282, but was not successful in holding possession of the See, reportedly because of his Norman blood.He took his claim to Rome, where he was eventually appointed by Pope Honorius IV on 12 July 1286. He was consecrated on 3 November 1287; and died in office in December 1320, after a long and painful illness. He was active in the early 1290s in raising money for the Crusades. He acted as a justice in eyre (circuit)in County Tipperary. He was renowned for fiercely upholding his Episcopal rights, and for extending the powers and privileges of his Diocese, but he was also famed for his courtesy.
