= Henry Holland, 3rd Duke of Exeter =

English admiral (1430–1475)

Henry Holland
- Born: 27 June 1430; Exeter, England
- Died: September 1475; English Channel
- Occupation: Duke of Exeter
- Known for: Leader during the War of the Roses
- Spouse: Anne of York
- Children: Anne Holland
- Parents: John Holland, 2nd Duke of Exeter (father); Anne Stafford (mother)

Arms of Henry Holland, 3rd Duke of Exeter: England, a bordure of France

Henry Holland, 3rd Duke of Exeter, 3rd Earl of Huntington (27 June 1430 – September 1475) was a Lancastrian leader during the English Wars of the Roses. He was the only son of John Holland, 2nd Duke of Exeter, and his first wife, Anne Stafford.

== Career ==
He inherited the Dukedom of Exeter and Earl of Huntington when his father died in 1447. However, he was cruel, savagely temperamental and unpredictable, and so had little support. P.M. Kendall describes him as "dangerous", and was seen as "cruel and fierce" by contemporary Italian observers.

== Constable of the Tower ==
Exeter was for a time Constable of the Tower of London, and afterwards the rack there came to be called "the Duke of Exeter's daughter".

== Wars of the Roses ==
In 1447 he married Anne, the six-year-old daughter of Richard of York. However, in the Wars of the Roses, he remained loyal to Henry VI against the Yorkists. He was imprisoned at Wallingford Castle when York briefly seized power after the First Battle of St Albans in 1455. In 1458 he participated in the Love Day, an attempt at reconciliation between the rival factions. He was a commander at the Lancastrian victories at the Battle of Wakefield in 1460 and the Second Battle of St Albans in 1461, and in the decisive defeat at Towton in 1461. He fled to Scotland after the battle, and then joined Queen Margaret in her exile in France. He was attainted in 1461, and his estates were given to his wife, who separated from him in 1464. During the brief period of Henry VI's restoration he was able to regain many of his estates and posts.

At the Battle of Barnet, Exeter commanded the Lancastrian left flank. He was badly wounded and left for dead, but survived. Afterwards he was imprisoned, and Anne divorced him in 1472. He "volunteered" to serve on Edward IV's 1475 expedition to France. On the return voyage he fell overboard and drowned, his body being found in the sea between Dover and Calais, Fabyan saying "but how he drowned, the certainty is not known". However, Giovanni Panicharolla, the Milanese envoy to the Burgundian court, was told by Duke Charles that the King of England had given specific orders for the sailors to throw his former brother-in-law overboard.

== Family ==
On 30 January 1446, in the chapel of the Bishop of Ely, Hatfield, Herefordshire, he married Anne of York, the eldest child of Richard, Duke of York, and Cecily Neville. She was an older sister of Edward IV and Richard III.

He had one legitimate child:

- Anne Holland (1461 – between 26 August 1467 and 6 June 1474), who married Thomas Grey, 1st Marquess of Dorset.

Since Henry had no legitimate male issue the disposition of his estates became a complex matter for his widow, the dowager Duchess of Exeter.

== See also ==
- List of people who disappeared mysteriously at sea
- List of unsolved deaths

== Ancestry ==
Ancestors of Henry Holland, 3rd Duke of Exeter

8. Thomas Holland, 1st Earl of Kent
4. John Holland, 1st Duke of Exeter
9. Lady Joan, 4th Countess of Kent
2. John Holland, 2nd Duke of Exeter
10. John of Gaunt, 1st Duke of Lancaster
5. Lady Elizabeth of Lancaster
11. Lady Blanche of Lancaster
1. Henry Holland, 3rd Duke of Exeter
12. Hugh de Stafford, 2nd Earl of Stafford
6. Edmund Stafford, 5th Earl of Stafford
13. Lady Philippa de Beauchamp
3. Lady Anne Stafford
14. Thomas of Woodstock, 1st Duke of Gloucester
7. Lady Anne of Gloucester
15. Lady Eleanor de Bohun

Political offices
| Preceded by The Duke of Suffolk | Lord High Admiral; 1450–1461 | Succeeded by The Earl of Kent |
Peerage of England
| Preceded by John Holland | Duke of Exeter; 1447–1461 | Forfeit |
