= Anne, Duchess of Exeter =

English noblewoman (1439–1476)

Anne Plantagenet
- Duchess of Exeter
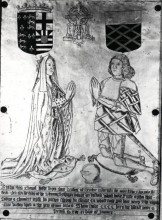
- Anne with her second husband Thomas St. Leger. Monumental brass in "St Leger Chantry" (later "Rutland Chantry"), St George's Chapel, Windsor Castle
- Born: 10 August 1439; Fotheringhay, Northamptonshire, England
- Died: 14 January 1476 (aged 36)
- Burial: 1 February 1476; St Leger Chantry, St George's Chapel, Windsor Castle
- Spouses: Henry Holland, 3rd Duke of Exeter (m. 1446; ann. 1461) Thomas St. Leger (m. 1474)
- Issue: Lady Anne Holland; Anne St. Leger, Baroness de Ros
- House: York
- Father: Richard Plantagenet, 3rd Duke of York
- Mother: Cecily Neville

Anne of York, Duchess of Exeter, aka Anne Plantagenet (10 August 1439 – 14 January 1476), was the first child of Richard Plantagenet, 3rd Duke of York, and Cecily Neville. She was thus the eldest sister of kings Edward IV (1461–1483) and Richard III (1483–1485) and their siblings Edmund, Earl of Rutland; Elizabeth of York, Duchess of Suffolk; Margaret, Duchess of Burgundy; and George Plantagenet, 1st Duke of Clarence.

== Marriages and issue ==
Anne married twice and divorced her first husband.

=== First marriage ===
Arms of Henry Holland, 3rd Duke of Exeter: England, a bordure of France

On 30 January 1446 in Hatfield, Herefordshire aged six years old, Anne was married to Henry Holland, 3rd Duke of Exeter (1430–1475). During the Wars of the Roses, Exeter sided with the House of Lancaster against his wife's family the House of York. Exeter was a commander at the great Lancastrian victories at the Battle of Wakefield and Second Battle of St Albans. He was also a commander at the Lancastrian defeat at the Battle of Towton. He fled to the Kingdom of Scotland after the battle, then joined Margaret of Anjou, queen consort of the Lancastrian King Henry VI, in her exile to France. On 4 March 1461, Anne's younger brother Edward, Duke of York, was declared in London as King Edward IV. Exeter was attainted but the new king gave his estates to Anne, with remainder to their daughter Anne Holland. Anne and Exeter separated in 1461 and divorced on 5 November 1471 on grounds of consanguinity. During the Readeption of Henry VI, Anne remained loyal to her brother Edward, and, in what seems to have been her only intervention in politics, worked hard to persuade her brother George, Duke of Clarence, to abandon the Lancastrian cause. If not decisive, her arguments certainly had some effect and thus she played some part in Edward's restoration.

By the Duke of Exeter, Anne had one daughter, Anne Holland (1461), who was married in October 1466 at Greenwich Palace to Thomas Grey, Lord Astley, son of Edward IV's queen Elizabeth Woodville by her first husband. Lady Astley died sometime between 26 August 1467 and 6 June 1474 without children. Grey subsequently married Cecily Bonville, 7th Baroness Harington, another rich young heiress, by whom he had issue.

=== Second marriage ===
Arms of St Leger: Azure fretty argent, a chief or

Anne married, secondly, in about 1474 to Thomas St. Leger (c. 1440 – 1483), a loyal follower of his brother-in-law King Edward IV (r. 1461–1483). He took part in the Duke of Buckingham's attempted rebellion against King Edward's younger brother and eventual successor King Richard III (r. 1483–1485), on the failure of which he was executed in 1483. In 1476, King Edward IV had, however, extended the remainder of most of the former Duke of Exeter's lands to the king's sister, Anne, and to any heirs of her body. Thus, if she remarried, any future children could inherit them.

Anne died giving birth to her only daughter by Thomas, Anne St. Leger (14 January 1476 – 21 April 1526), who due to the special remainder was heiress to the estates of her mother's first husband Henry Holland. She married George Manners, 11th Baron de Ros, and was mother of the royal favourite Thomas Manners, 1st Earl of Rutland.

== Death and burial ==
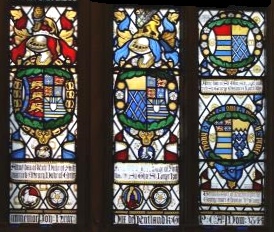
Heraldic glass in the Rutland Chapel, St George's Chapel, Windsor Castle, erected in 1849 by Charles Manners, 6th Duke of Rutland. It shows far left the arms of Anne of York, Duchess of Exeter (1439–1476) impaled by the arms of her 1st husband Henry Holland, 3rd Duke of Exeter. To the right of the last are her arms impaled by the arms of her 2nd husband Sir Thomas St. Leger (c. 1440 – 1483), KG. The rightmost window shows top: the arms of Anne's daughter Anne St Leger impaled by the arms of her husband George Manners, 11th Baron de Ros (c. 1470 – 1513). Below are the arms of his son Thomas Manners, 1st Earl of Rutland (c. 1492 – 1543) impaling the arms of his 2nd wife Eleanor Paston

Anne died and was buried on 1 February 1476 in the St Leger Chantry, forming the northern transept of St George's Chapel, Windsor Castle, founded in 1481 by her husband, "with two priests singing forevermore". It was later named the Rutland Chantry in honour of her son-in-law George Manners, 11th Baron de Ros (whose effigy, with that of his wife Anne St Leger, is situated in the chantry), father of Thomas Manners, 1st Earl of Rutland. A monumental brass in memory of Anne of York and her husband Sir Thomas St. Leger survives on the east wall of the St Leger Chantry inscribed as follows:

"Wythin thys Chappell lyethe beryed Anne Duchess of Exetur suster unto the noble kyng Edward the forte. And also the body of syr Thomas Sellynger knyght her husband which hathe funde within thys College a Chauntre with too prestys sy'gyng for ev'more. On whose soule god have mercy. The wych Anne duchess dyed in the yere of oure lorde M Thowsande CCCCl xxv"

The arms above Anne show her paternal arms of the Dukes of York: in the dexter half the royal arms of England, emphasising their descent from Lionel of Antwerp, 1st Duke of Clarence (1338–1368), third son of King Edward III (on which basis the House of York claimed the throne), who married Elizabeth de Burgh, 4th Countess of Ulster (1332–1363). Their daughter Philippa de Burgh married Edmund Mortimer, 3rd Earl of March, whose son Roger Mortimer, 4th Earl of March, was the great-grandfather of Anne, her brother King Edward IV, and their siblings. In the sinister half are shown in chief: Or a cross gules (de Burgh) and in base: Barry or and azure, on a chief of the first two pallets between two base esquires of the second over all an inescutcheon argent (Mortimer).
