= Ulcombe =

Village in Kent, England

Coordinates: 51.21708°N 0.64257°E

Ulcombe, Kent
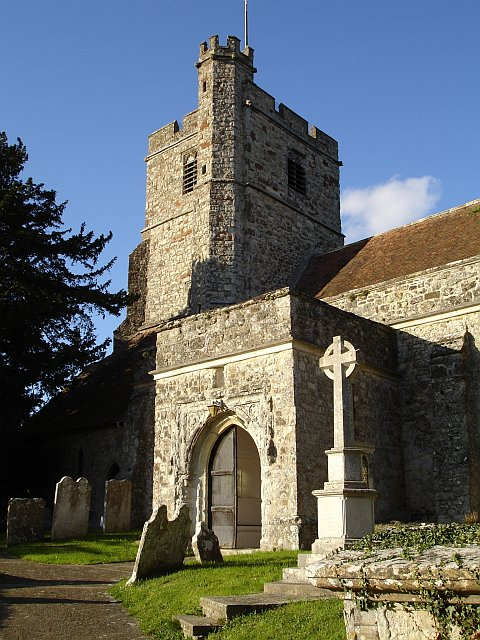
- All Saints Church

- Location within Kent
- Population: 890 (2011 Civil Parish including Chegworth)
- OS grid reference: TQ846497
- Shire county: Kent
- Region: South East
- Country: England
- Sovereign state: United Kingdom
- Post town: Maidstone
- Postcode district: ME17
- Dialling code: 01622
- Police: Kent
- Fire: Kent
- Ambulance: South East Coast
- UK Parliament: Weald of Kent
- Website: Ulcombe Parish Council

Ulcombe is a village and civil parish near the town of Maidstone in Kent, England. The name is recorded in the Domesday Book and is thought to derive from 'Owl-coomb': 'coomb' (pronounced 'coo-m') meaning 'a deep little wooded valley; a hollow in a hill side' (Chambers Dictionary) in Old English. The original deserted Medieval village site lies to the east of the parish church in a valley. There is also a water-mill below this site, probably of early origins. It stands below the Greensand Way.

There is much evidence from recent archaeological fieldwork, undertaken under the direction of Neil Aldridge, for prehistoric and later occupation. A number of Palaeolithic hand-axes have been found to the east of Great Tong Bank, and are the result of solifluction over the last 70,000 years from an earlier river system. Lithic implements from the Mesolithic, Bronze Age and Neolithic periods show that the landscape was being used by early settlers. The Iron Age is the period when the local deposits of iron ore were being smelted and this continued into the Roman occupation of the 1st-3rd century AD. Near Jubilee Corner an Iron Age cremation cemetery was excavated along with an iron smelting site. A later Roman occupation site lay to the north, when excavated, two timber buildings, one of sill-beam construction, were recorded.

The old village hall was dismantled and re-erected at the Museum of Kent Life, Sandling, having been made redundant by the construction of a new building.

The manor of Ulcombe belonged to the St Leger family.

All Saints Church is a 12th-century Grade I listed building. It includes monuments of the St. Leger family, the Marquess and Marchioness of Ormonde, and Lady Sarah Wandesford, daughter of the Earl of Carrick.

In the 16th and 17th centuries Ulcombe was the location of a bell foundry run by three generations of the Hatch family, whose output included the bell known as "Bell Harry", after which the central tower of Canterbury Cathedral is known.

In 2012, Hill House (a private house) won the Minor Residential category of the Kent Design Awards.

== See also ==
- Listed buildings in Ulcombe

== Bibliography ==
- Goodsall, R.H. (1970), A Third Kentish Patchwork, Stedehill, ISBN 978-0-950-01511-8
- Stahlschmidt, J.C.L. (1887), The Church Bells of Kent: Their Inscriptions, Founders, Uses and Traditions, Stock, OCLC 12772194

== Other sources ==
- Ulcombes Story: A Millennium History, 2004, Aldridge, etc.
