= Burning of Edinburgh =

1544 military action of the Rough Wooing

- Part of the Rough Wooing
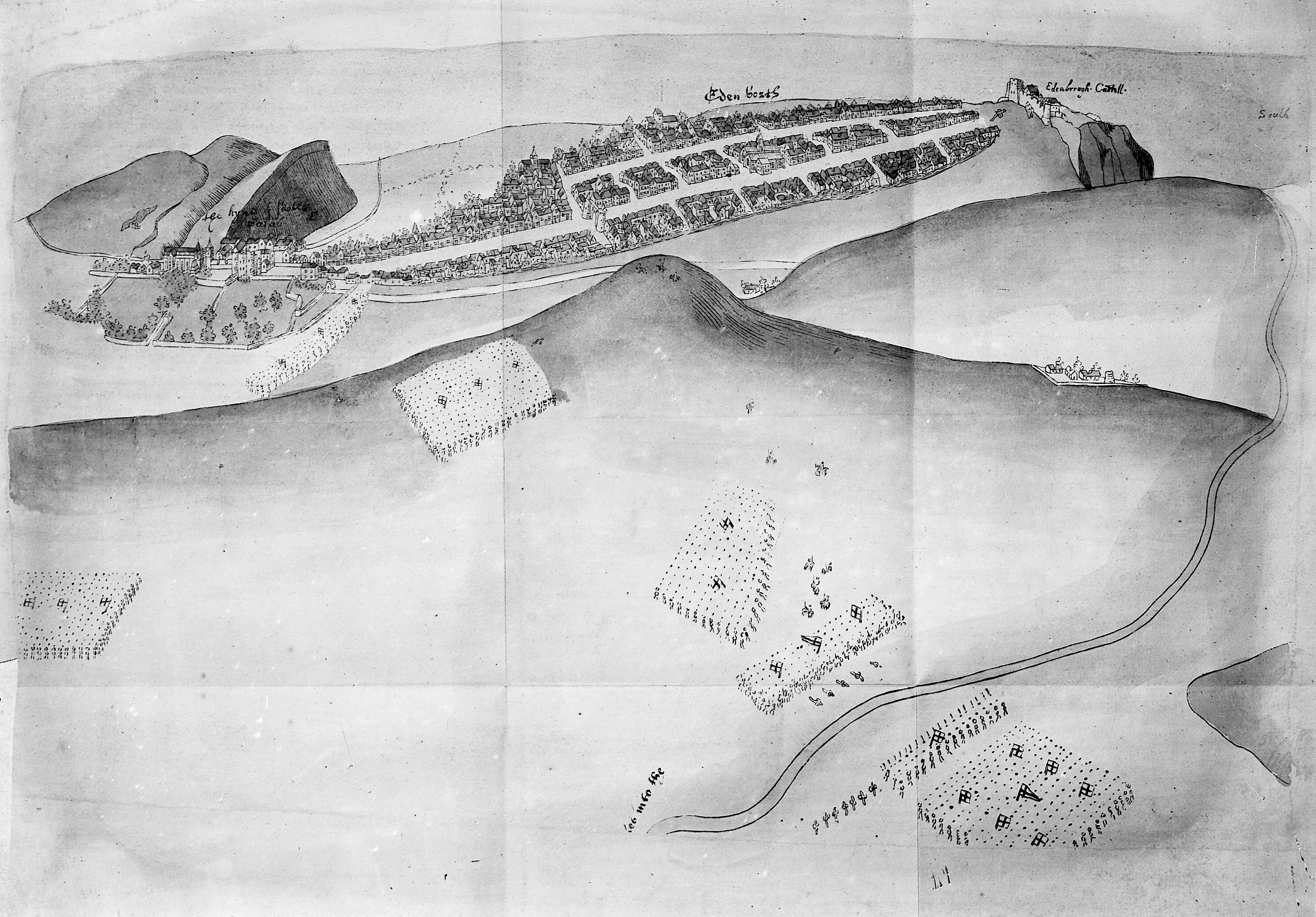
- Sketch made by an engineer with the English Army for Henry VIII, showing the attack of the English troops on the town prior to the burning of the city.
Date	7 May 1544
Location	Edinburgh, Scotland 55.95°N 3.19°W
Result	English victory

Belligerents
Kingdom of Scotland	Kingdom of England

Commanders and leaders
Regent Arran; Adam Otterburn; James Hamilton of Stenhouse	Lord Hertford; Earl of Shrewsbury; Viscount Lisle

Strength
Approx 6,000 horsemen with infantry (not engaged)	200 troop-ships 12,000 infantry 4,000 border horsemen

Casualties and losses
Over 400	40

The Burning of Edinburgh in 1544 by an English army was the first major action of the war of the Rough Wooing. The Provost of Edinburgh was compelled to allow the English to sack Leith and Edinburgh, and the city was burnt on 7 May. However, the Scottish artillery within Edinburgh Castle harassed the English forces, who had neither the time nor the resources to besiege the Castle. The English fleet sailed away loaded with captured goods, and with two ships that had belonged to King James V.

== The plan ==
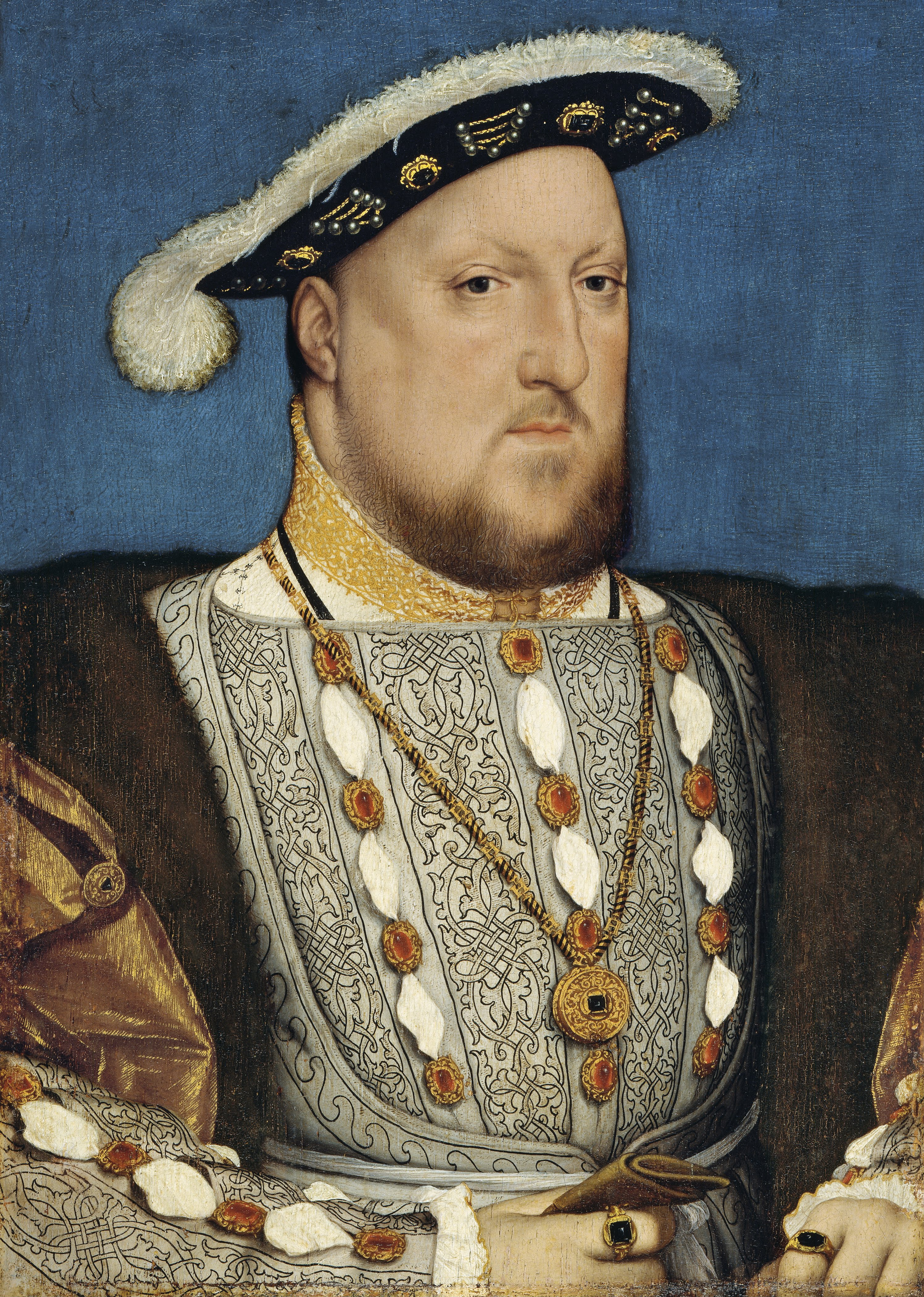
Henry VIII

Henry VIII of England wished to unite the Kingdom of Scotland with the Kingdom of England, or at least bring the kingdom under his hegemony. He had contracted with the Regent Arran that Mary, Queen of Scots would marry his son, Prince Edward, but Arran allowed the Parliament of Scotland to revoke an agreement made at Greenwich prompting Henry to declare war in December 1543. Regent Arran was making ground against his rebels who still supported the English marriage, such as the Earl of Lennox, Earl of Glencairn, the Earl of Cassillis, and the Earl of Angus. These nobles were in touch with Henry VIII via Lennox's secretary Thomas Bishop and Angus's chaplain, Master John Penven. Their letters to Henry VIII requested intervention, and in March Henry replied that a "main army" was in preparation. Henry VIII's Privy Council issued his instructions for the invasion force on 10 April 1544, and they were to:

Put all to fire and sword, burn Edinburgh, so razed and defaced when you have sacked and gotten what ye can of it, as there may remain forever a perpetual memory of the vengeance of God lightened upon [them] for their falsehood and disloyalty.

Edward Seymour, 1st Duke of Somerset, at this time called Lord Hertford, was the King's Lieutenant of this Army Royal. He had considered establishing an English garrison at Leith, within walls made of timber topped with turf, and fortifying Inchkeith but the Privy Council vetoed this plan. Henry VIII had also asked him to destroy St Andrews, but Hertford pointed out the extra distance would be troublesome.

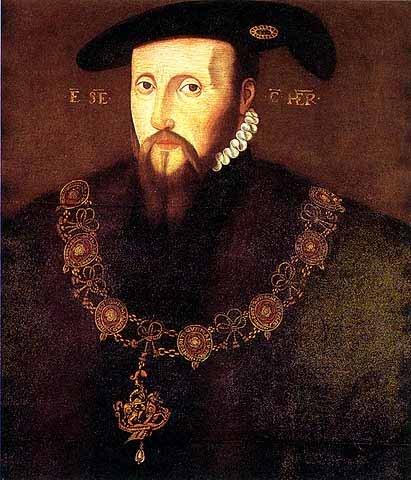
Edward Seymour, Earl of Hertford

Hertford discussed with Privy Council the possibility of Scottish allies capturing Cardinal Beaton during his invasion. Henry believed that Beaton, a favourer of the Auld Alliance with France, was particularly responsible for the rejection of the marriage plan. Beaton's would-be kidnappers included James Kirkcaldy of Grange, Norman Leslie Master of Rothes, and John Charteris who offered to attempt to capture the Cardinal as he travelled in Fife. Their second scheme was to attack Arbroath while attention was focused on Edinburgh. This offer was made by Alexander Crichton of Brunstane who sent a messenger called Wishart to Hertford. Time was too short to offer military support for these plans, but if those concerned would join in the destruction of Church property they would be offered asylum in England and £1000 to fund their action. Any schemes more elaborate than a punitive raid on Edinburgh were shelved as Henry committed resources to the siege of Boulogne in France already planned for the summer.

Lord Hertford wrote to his Scottish ally, the Master of Morton, the future Regent Morton, in April 1544, discussing his journey towards Berwick-upon-Tweed, and hoping he would leave the castles of Dalkeith and Tantallon in the hands of allies.

== Supplies ==
The army assembled at Newcastle upon Tyne and Gateshead. In April 1544, Sir Christopher Morris reported to Lord Hertford that he had organised munitions for the invasion at Berwick-upon-Tweed. These included:

- 2 bastard culverins
- 3 sakers
- 8 falcons
- 1 falconette
- 4 carriages with two 'bases' on each
- 3,000 bows, 1,000 ready strung in 60 chests
- 4,000 sheaves of arrows in 80 chests
- 4 barrels of bow strings; described further as 40 gross of 12 dozen, i.e., 5,760 strings
- 480 Moorish pikes
- 3,000 bills

Anthony Neville of South Leverton was appointed Surveyor General of Victuals for the army. Edward Shelley (who was one of the first English soldiers to be killed at the battle of Pinkie) reported that he had 40 thousand-weight of biscuit on 20 April. At Berwick, Shelley had problems getting enough coal or wood for baking and brewing. He had to ask permission to impress more supplies and hold sales to rotate his stock. 4,000 border horsemen waited at Berwick for Hertford's signal. At first it was planned that they would make a diversionary attack on Haddington. Their commander Ralph Eure wrote from Alnwick on 28 April that these 'countrymen' were so poor he had to lend them money. He also asked for 1,000 Yorkshire archers as reinforcement so that they could come to Edinburgh to support the landing. In the event, it was agreed that Hertford would summon Eure when he had disembarked his troops. When Eure's men arrived in Edinburgh they would get their pay.

=== Orders for the fleet ===
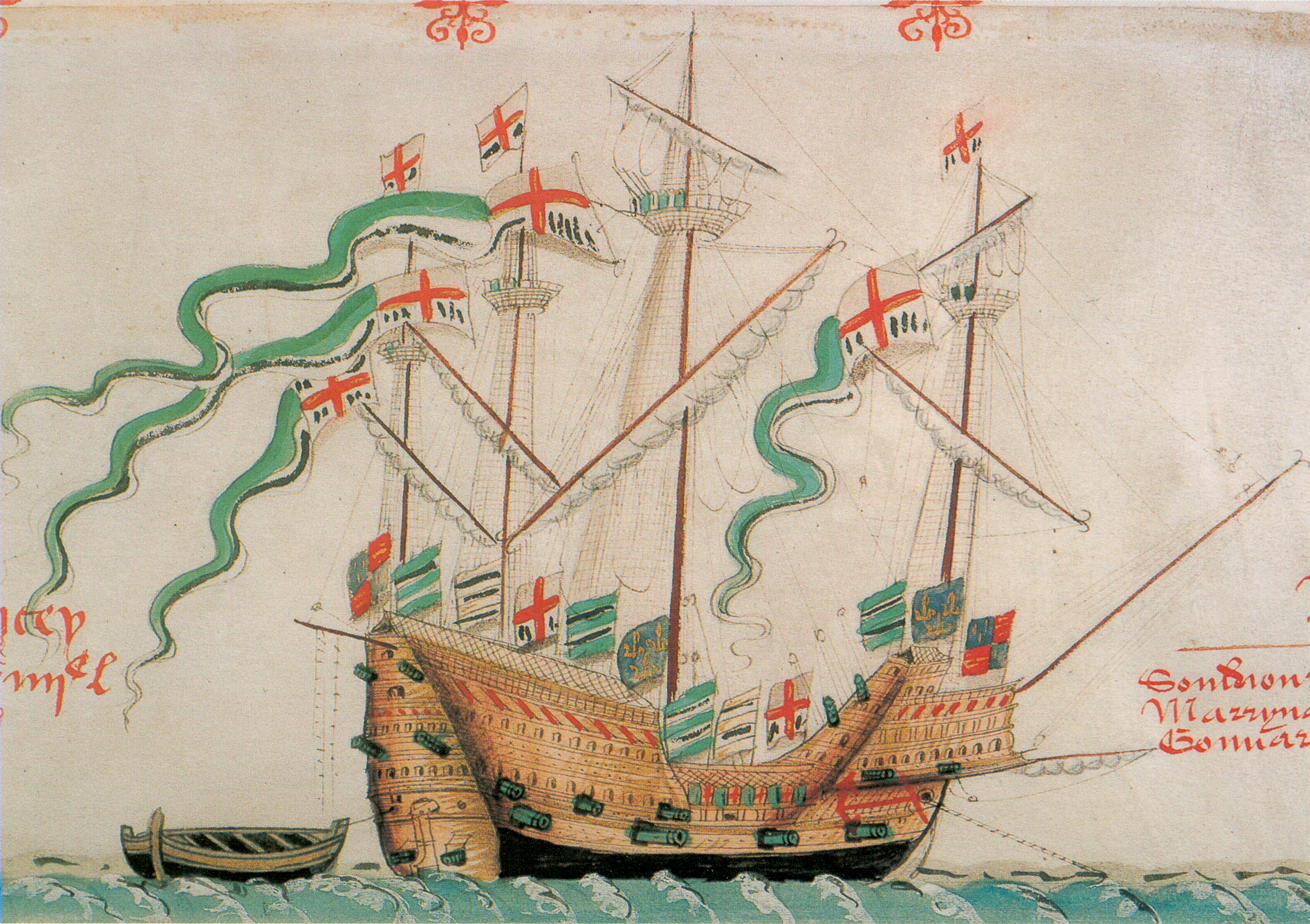
The carrack Pauncy from the Anthony Roll

Orders for the fleet at Tynemouth were given on 28 April. All the ships were to be ready to weigh anchor at a favourable wind. The Lord Admiral, Viscount Lisle's flagship would fly the St George Cross on the fore-top mast and two top-lights at night. The ships of the 'vaward', the vanguard, would follow and anchor as near as possible. Hertford and the treasure-ship (Ralph Sadler was treasurer) would follow with his ensign on the main-top mast of the Rose Lion with two night lights on the shrouds. The Earl of Shrewsbury, captain of the rear-ward would fly the ensign on his mizzen mast, with a cresset light in the poop deck at night. The other ships were not to show flags or lights. Any ship that was transporting base or double base guns was to mount them on the fore-deck for the landing.

The ships were, for the vanguard or forward; the Pauncy, Minion, Swallow, Gabian of Ipswich, John Evangelist, Galley Subtle, with the barque of Calais. For the battle; the Sweepstake, Swan of Hamburgh, Mary Grace, and the Elizabeth of Lynn. For the rear-ward; the Great Galley, Gillian of Dartmouth, Peter of Foy, Anthony Fulford, and the Barque Riveley.

== Defence ==
On 23 April 1544, all Scottish east coast towns were warned to entrench their bounds to resist the English navy. Men from neighbouring counties were summoned to muster in Edinburgh on 5 May. Extra gunners were hired for Edinburgh Castle, and Regent Arran's goods and the royal tapestries were carried up the Royal Mile from Holyroodhouse to the Castle and watched by his wardrobe servant Malcolm Gourlay. In the previous month an Edinburgh merchant James Johnston of Coates was paid £22 for going to "find out the Englishmen's purpose." The Burgh records are mostly missing for the year, so there is no detailed information on any defence measures provided by the town. The English account mentions that the Scots had cast great trenches and ditches to defend Leith.

== The landing ==
An account of the episode was published later in 1544 in London as; The Late Expedition in Scotland made by the King's highness' army under the conduct of the Right Honourable the Earl of Hertford in 1544. A later account by Mary's secretary Claude Nau records the fleet burning St Mynettes on the north side of the Forth and taking fishing boats for landing-craft. John Knox gave an account of the landing from another Scottish viewpoint. The English fleet was sighted before noon on Saturday 3 May. Knox said that Cardinal Beaton dismissed the threat and sat calmly at dinner. At 6 pm there were 200 ships and an English pilot sounded the depths between Granton and Leith. Though experts could see this meant the English minded to land still there was no Scottish response. At daybreak on Sunday some of the smaller boats nosed onto land at Granton Crags and the troops landed using these as piers for the larger boats. According to Knox, when around 10,000 men were landed unchallenged the Cardinal and Regent Arran left Edinburgh. Nau wrote that the landing was at "Werdy Chasteau", meaning Wardie to the east of Granton.

The English account is similar, but mentions the presence of five or six thousand horsemen and some foot soldiers, positioned to prevent the short march from Granton to Leith at a ford on the Water of Leith. The Cardinal was with this army but after a few shots and only a couple of casualties on either side, the Scots abandoned their position at the ford of a stream, leaving their eight cannon. (Lisle said two slings and three serpentines were placed to fire across the river, agreeing with Lee's plan). The Earls of Huntly and Moray also left the field. Hertford's own dispatch describes this as a half-hour fight, "right sharply handled on both parts", with Peter Meutas's hagbuters giving good service. The Admiral reported that Beaton stayed until he was in range of the handguns. He was wearing a frock of yellow velvet, cut and pulled out with white tinselled sarcenet.

== Leith ==
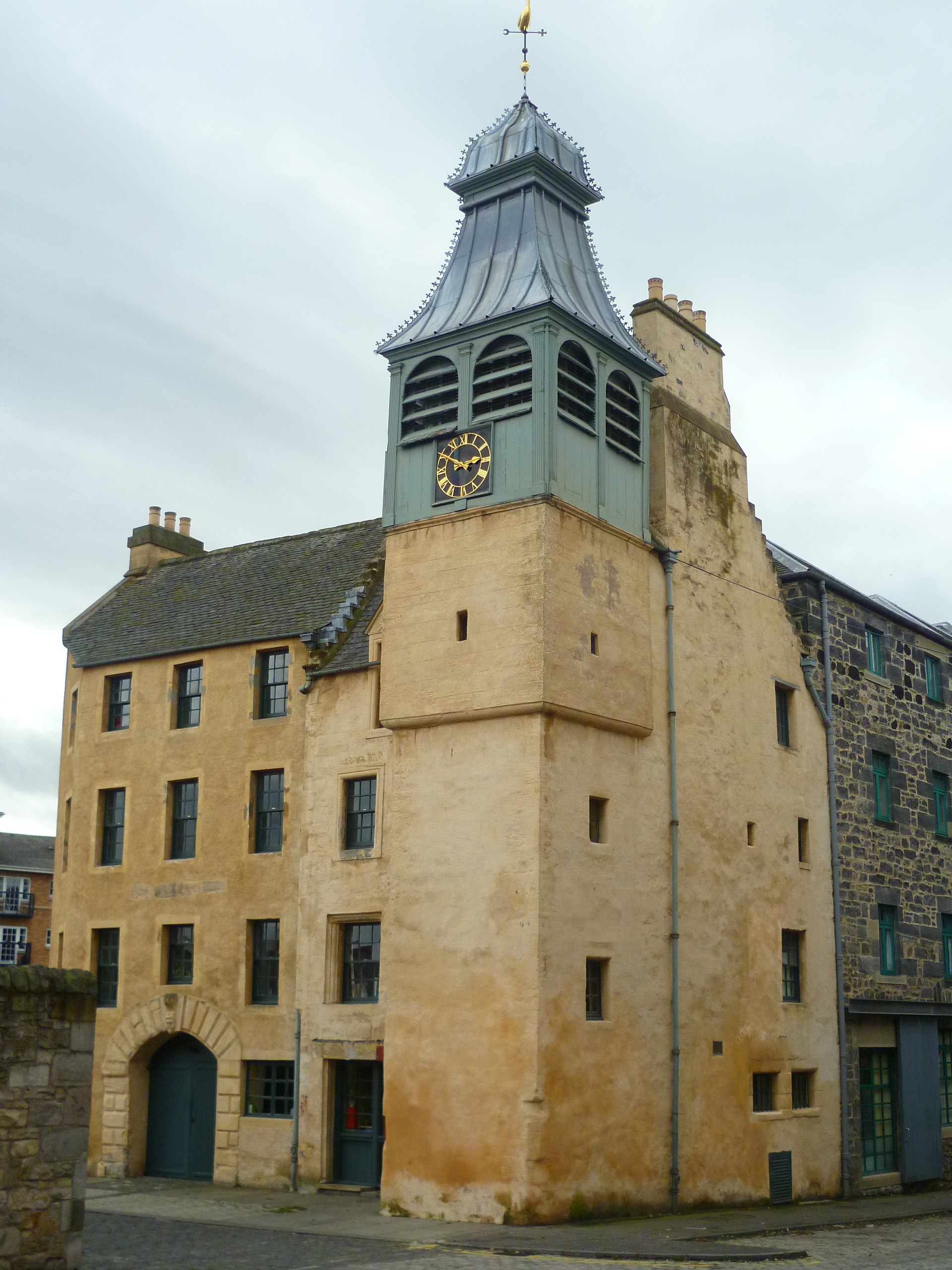
St Ninian's Chapel at the Bridgend was burnt in May 1544. The attached manse still stands.

Another stand before Leith itself gave some resistance, but folded after three expert Scottish gunners were killed by arrows. Hertford summoned Eure and the border horsemen with a brief note mentioning the lack of resistance, signed from the field on the west of Leith. The English then entered Leith unopposed, where they found two ships that had belonged to James V, the Salamander of Leith and the Unicorn. Some buildings in Leith were burnt, including St Ninian's chapel at the Bridge-end. The records and foundation charters of the Leith fraternity of shoemakers or "cordiners" were lost in the fires.

The overnight security of the English forces in Leith was increased by recently constructed defensive entrenchments. Next day, Monday 5 May, the larger English ships were able to unload the heavier artillery on the quayside of the Shore of Leith. These guns were to be used against Edinburgh's gates and the castle. Cardinal Beaton left the area on Monday, the date recorded in his accounts for hiring a guide between Corstorphine and Stirling, (a journey then more usually made by boat). According to Eustace Chapuys, on the same day the Cardinal's enemy Alexander Crichton of Brunstane tried to meet Hertford at Leith, but an English guard shot him with an arrow in the leg. However, Hertford wrote that Brunstane was in the field with Arran and retreated with him to Linlithgow.

The Earl of Angus, George Douglas of Pittendreich and Lord Maxwell were in prison at Blackness Castle and Edinburgh Castle because they supported the English alliance. Arran, Guise, and the Cardinal now ordered their release so their supporters would help their cause. Maxwell later wrote that they were offered cash inducements, with incomes from church lands and pensions from the King of France.

== Edinburgh ==
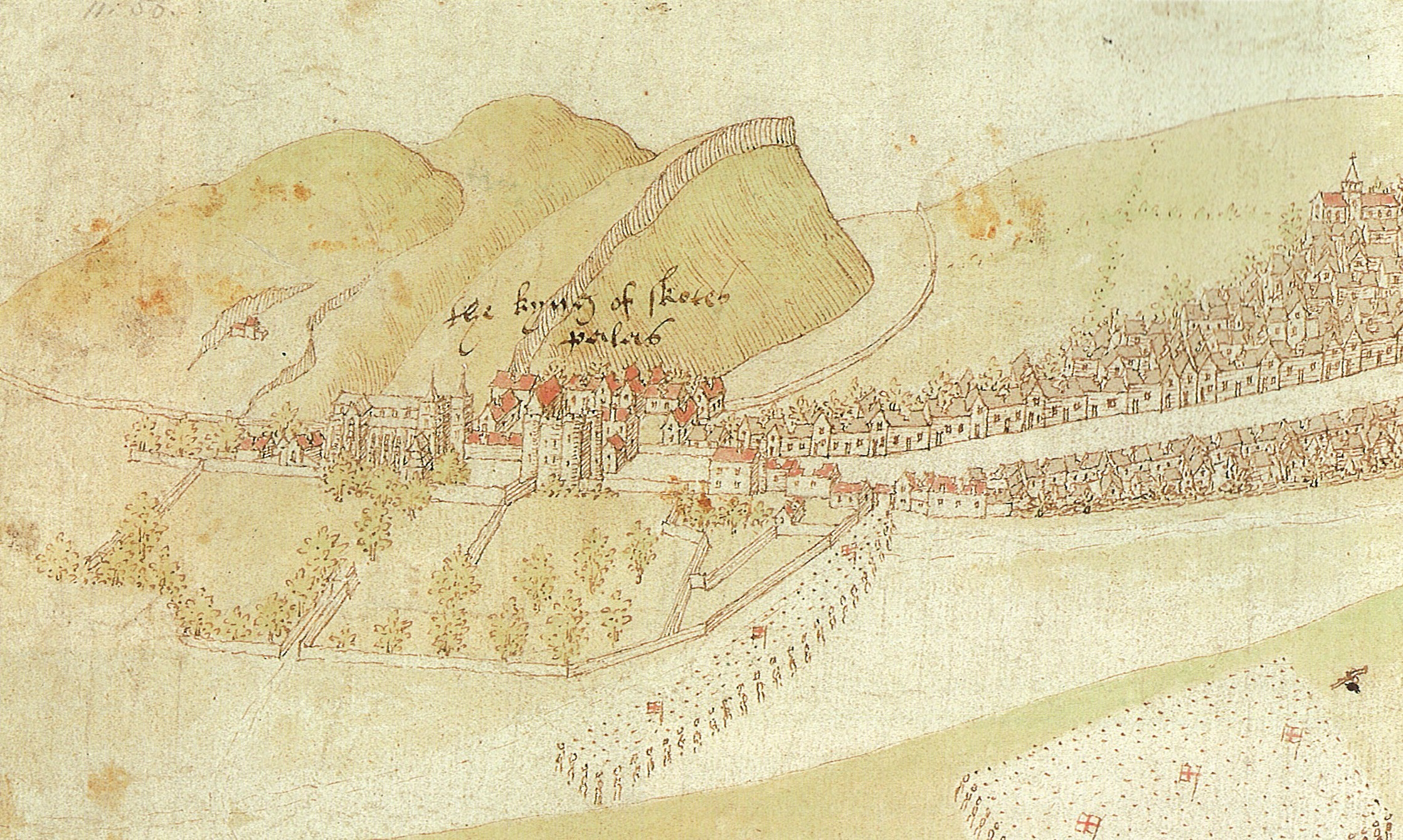
Detail of Richard Lee's sketch showing the Palace of Holyroodhouse, English troops entering the Canongate and an English position on Calton Hill.

Lord Stourton (later commander of the Newhaven fort at Ambleteuse) was left in charge of Leith on 6 May with 1,500 men while the main force approached Edinburgh itself. They were met by the Provost Adam Otterburn and two heralds. Otterburn offered to give up the keys of the town on conditions. Hertford refused to accept as he had no authority to bargain. Another English herald went to the Castle, and returned with the news that the Earl of Huntly and Lord Home had brought 2,000 horsemen to defend the town.

Sir Christopher Morris was then ordered to bring his artillery up the Canongate to assault Edinburgh's Netherbow Gate. During this operation some of the English gunners were killed. The infantry attacked the gate and, according to the English narrative, pulled one of the Scottish artillery pieces through its gunloop. The Scots could not retaliate due to heavy small arms fire and archery, during which Morris placed a cannon close to the gate. After three or four rounds, the gate was breached and the English army stormed through killing 300 or 400 defenders. The Scottish exchequer accounts record that their heavy guns were withdrawn from the High Street into the Castle. Thomas Schort, a Scottish armourer and deacon of the Hammerman craft, and his companion, a young Frenchman, were killed at the fighting at the Netherbow.

At this point, according to a report sent to Charles V, the English troops who were unused to urban warfare fought amongst each other, and William Howard, brother of the Duke of Norfolk, was hurt in the cheek by an English arrow. On the High Street, the central main street of Edinburgh, the English were exposed to the artillery of the Castle. They attempted to place their cannon above the Butter-Tron, between Lawnmarket and Castlehill. A shot from the Castle dismounted one English cannon, and Hertford ordered it to be deliberately burst. At the end of that day, the English retired from the town to their camp at Leith after starting a number of fires.

On 7 May, the fire-raising and looting continued, in the town and at Holyrood, and the English force was joined by Ralph Eure's 4,000 border horsemen. Lord Hertford and his companions wrote that they watched Edinburgh burn from a hill beside the town and could hear "women and poor miserable creatures" crying out and blaming the Cardinal.

The destruction of merchant's houses in Edinburgh was not total. A few years later Alexander Sandilands brought a case against James Hamilton of Stanehouse, Captain of Edinburgh Castle. During the crisis Sandilands sold his wine to Hamilton, but he was never paid and his house was not burnt (or looted) by the English. Hamilton's representatives also bought wine and empty barrels from James Rynd's wife on 8 May, mentioning that timber could be used to reinforce the castle walls.

As destruction continued, Nicholas Poyntz was sent with his ship, the Great Galley, to burn Kinghorn and other villages in Fife. The fortress on the island of Inchgarvie was captured and destroyed by Richard Brooke in the Galley Subtile on 6 May. Hertford had mentioned in his dispatch that it would have been useful to garrison Inchgarvie, but his orders from Henry VIII would not allow it. According to Chapuys, a fort on another island, probably Inchkeith, was destroyed.

Christopher Morris shipped the larger artillery, the ships sailed, and on 14 May the harbour and piers of Leith were demolished. Hertford, as the King's Lieutenant, knighted fifty-eight of his captains and his servant Thomas Fisher distributed three pounds and fifteen shillings amongst the men. The army left Leith by land on 15 May, stopping to burn Seton Palace and Haddington.

== Edinburgh Castle ==
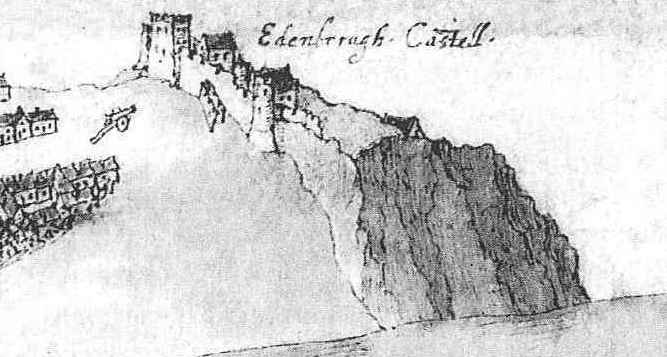
Detail of Richard Lee's sketch showing Edinburgh Castle with an English siege gun before David's Tower

Although Hertford's army entered the town with little resistance, the defenders of the castle led by the Captain, James Hamilton of Stenhouse kept up an artillery barrage, firing down the line of the Royal Mile. The Clerk of the King's Works, Richard Lee, who was Captain of the Pioneers on this expedition and the Surveyor of Calais, William Burgate, declared the castle impregnable.

One of the Castle gunners was Andrew Mansioun, a French carver who had made fittings for the Unicorn, the yacht of James V and furniture for the royal palaces. His hand was injured when a cannon backfired, and in June 1544 he was given 44 shillings to pay for treatment.

Repairs were made in July 1544, when two of the gunners, Tibault Roqueneau and Piers Schouffene (French or Flemish, originally employed at Dunbar Castle) were working to improve the gun emplacements with gabions. The fore-wall of the castle was strengthened and repaired from July. This work was completed between July and August 1546 by three masons and four workmen (called barrowmen in the accounts).

== Looting ==
Hertford estimated the value of goods in Leith at £10,000. This included a large stock of three grades of linen cloth from Brittany. The ships were loaded with property seized in Edinburgh and Leith. He also took the Salamander and Unicorn, loading them with 80,000 cannon balls for ballast from the King's Wark arsenal. One surviving captured item is the Dunkeld Lectern, removed from Holyrood Abbey before the English soldiers fired the church. The lectern may have come into the possession of Sir Richard Lee who made plans of Edinburgh and Leith and assessed the strength of Edinburgh Castle. Lee certainly took a brass font from Holyrood which he gave to St Albans Abbey. He had it engraved with an inscription claiming that it was used for the baptism of the Kings of Scotland. As a relic of the monarchy it was destroyed during the English Civil War. Longleat House has a manuscript copy of a translation of Hector Boece's Chronicle of Scotland, taken by John Thynne, Hertford's steward, from Holyroodhouse on Wednesday 7 May 1544.

Some of Hertford's muster lists survive at Longleat. These include the name of Sir William Norris of Liverpool. It has traditionally been asserted that carved panelling at his house of Speke Hall came from the Palace of Holyroodhouse though this has been challenged on stylistic grounds. At Speke there were legal books including Bartolus sup. primi degestis veteris, Venice (1499) and Panormitanus on the Decretals, Lyon (1501), with Robert Estienne's Bible (1532). William Norris wrote in each volume that they were won at Edinburgh on 8 May 1544. The books passed to the library of the Liverpool Athenaeum in the 19th century. They were returned to Edinburgh in 2008 when the National Library of Scotland bought the collection. Inscriptions show they belonged to the Abbot of Cambuskenneth, who had a lodging on the south side of the Lawnmarket.

== Destruction of records ==
Family papers and property records were destroyed by the fires. William Hamilton of Sanquhar lost a charter from 1526 which was kept in a chamber of his Edinburgh lodging. The official record of the grant in a register book was burnt in the chamber of clerks of the chancellary. Other legal papers and crown records were held in Edinburgh Castle. Mary of Guise reissued the 1526 grant to Hamilton in June 1555.

== Burnt places ==
The returning English army burnt a number of settlements. The destruction was described by Walter Lynne in his appendix to Johann Carion's Cronicles, (1550); "burnyng and destroyeng the countrey about, sparyng nether castel, towne, pyle nor vyllage, untyll they had overthrowen and destroyed many of them, as the borough and towne of Edenborough with the Abbey called Holy Rodehouse, and the kynges Palice adjoyned to the same. The towne of Lyth also with the haven and peyre. The castell and vyllage of Cragmyller, the Abbay of Newbottell, and parte of Muskelborowe towne, the Chappel of our lady of Lawret. Preston towne, and the castell Hatintowne wyth the Freres and Nunery, and castell of Oliuer Sancklers, the towne of Dunbar, Laurestone wyth the Graunge, with many other townes, castels, vyllages and pyles."

The following places burnt or demolished were listed by William Patten, with other places and dates from a manuscript in the Harley Collection.

- Craigmillar Castle and village, 12 May.
- Nether Duddingstone, 12 May
- Sandhinche, 12 May
- The Ficket, Fickettes, (possibly Figgate), 12 May
- Prestonpans and Preston Tower, 12 May
- Newbattle Abbey, 15 May
- Part of Musselburgh and the Chapel of Loretto, 15 May
- three towers at Preston, Scottish Borders, (Billie Castle, Bonkyll Castle, & Blanerne Castle)
- A castle of Oliver Sinclair's, probably at Whitekirk
- Dunbar
- Lauriston and its Grange
- Drylaw
- Wester Craig,
- Enderleigh, Pele and town, Kirkland Hill
- Hatherwick (sic)
- Broughton
- Belton
- Yester Fells
- Crawnend, Bowland
- Duddingston, Butterden,
- Seton Palace, 16 May
- Stanhows, (possibly Stanhope, Peeblesshire)
- Quickwood
- Beverton, or "Bentestoun" (Stevenson House).
- Tranent, 16 May
- Haddington town, Friary, and Nunnery, 17 May
- Markle Castle, 17 May.
- Byldy (sic) and Billie Tower near Auchencrow
- Stenton, 17 May
- Traprain Law, 17 May
- East Linton, 17 May
- village up to the foot of Tantallon Castle (Telton), 18 May
- East Barnes, 18 May
- Blackthorn, 18 May
- Blackburn or Blackthorn
- Dunbar, 18 May
- Raunton or Raynton, ?Reston, and Pele of Byckley, 19 May
- Places burnt by the fleet under the command of Nicholas Poyntz; Kinghorn, St Monans, South Queensferry, a part of Pittenweem, Burntisland

== Aftermath ==
The XXII day of May was the Assencion day, and at nyght was made grete bone-fyers thorrow all London, and grete chere in every parych at every bone-fyer, and grete melody with dyvers instrewments; and the mayer wyth the shereffes rydynge thorrow every warde of London to see how it was done, for the good tydynges that came owte of Scotland

— Chronicle of the Grey Friars of London, 1544

News spread quickly throughout Europe, though Nicholas Wotton at Speyer had to show the importance of Edinburgh as the capital of Scotland using the chronicles of Hector Boece and John Mair. However, apart from the physical destruction, a recent historian of the conflict Marcus Merriman concluded that the army, "really did little of any long-term effect."

After the English army left Scotland, Arran's regency was challenged at a council meeting in Stirling on 29 May 1544, and for a time Mary of Guise was acknowledged as Regent by her allies. She began to mint four penny bawbees at Stirling with her insignia. Arran and Guise held rival parliaments in November, but she was forced to concede her claim to the regency to Arran.

At the end of May 1544, English soldiers were mustered and sent from the west border at Carlisle and Liddesdale to Dover to campaign in France. They fought at the Siege of Boulogne.

Although Edinburgh was not again threatened by the war, rebuilding was a slow process. New buildings were built on the exact site of their predecessors. Tenure of the Edinburgh lands was complex with numbers of owners claiming incomes from sub-divided buildings, with some portions 'mortified' to the chaplains of altars. At the end of the war, in September 1551 and February 1552 Parliament laid down guidelines for sharing the burden of costs for re-building the burnt lands and tenements "brint be the auld inimies of Ingland."

== Hertford's knights and captains ==
Hertford, as the King's lieutenant, knighted the men listed below. The names of his captains are recorded in pay-books and muster lists preserved at Longleat House, including "The book of Musters of such as were at the fyrst burnenge of Lythe and Edenborowe".

Soldiers knighted on Sunday, 11 May, at Leith;

- Edward Clinton
- John Conyers, of Hornby
- William Wroughton
- Thomas Venables
- Thomas Leigh alias Doctor.
- Edward Darrell (died 1549)
- John Luttrell
- George Bowes of Streatlam.
- Ralph Bulmer
- Thomas Holcroft, of Vale Royal.
- William Brereton
- Hugh Cholmeley, of Roxby.
- Edward Warren, of Poynton.
- Brian Layton
- Piers Legh, of Lyme
- John Constable.
- Edmund Trafford
- Hugh Calverly, of Lea
- John Atherton
- Thomas Gerrat
- Richard Lee.
- Richard Cholmley of Roxby.
- Thomas Waterton
- William Vavasour
- Richard Shirborne of Stonyhurst
- Peter Frecheville, of Staveley
- Thomas Cokayne, of Ashbourne
- Robert Stapleton
- Richard Egerton
- Laurence Smyth, of Hough
- William Ratcliff, of Ordsall
- Thomas Maleveray, of Allerton
- Robert Worseley
- Thomas Talbott, of Bashall
- Richard Holland
- John Lee or Leigh, of (Norbury) Booths.
- Thomas Clere of Norfolk
- Anthony Neville of South Leverton
- Leonard Beckwith.
- John Jenninges
- Thomas Holt.

Knighted on Tuesday, 13 May, at Leith;

- Charles Howard
- George Blount
- William Woodhowse
- George Brereton
- Sir Urian Brereton
- Philip Egerton.

Knighted on Sunday, 18 May, at Butterdean near Coldingham, (called Kilspindie Castle);

- William Damport (Davenport), of Bramall
- Ralph Leycester, of Toft
- Edmund Savage, of Clifton called Rocksavage
- John Massey
- John Nevill
- Hugh Willoughby
- Edward Warner
- Peter Meutas
- Robert Constable
- Humphrey Braidburne
- Francis Hothome.
