= Auchencrow =

Village in Scottish Borders, Scotland

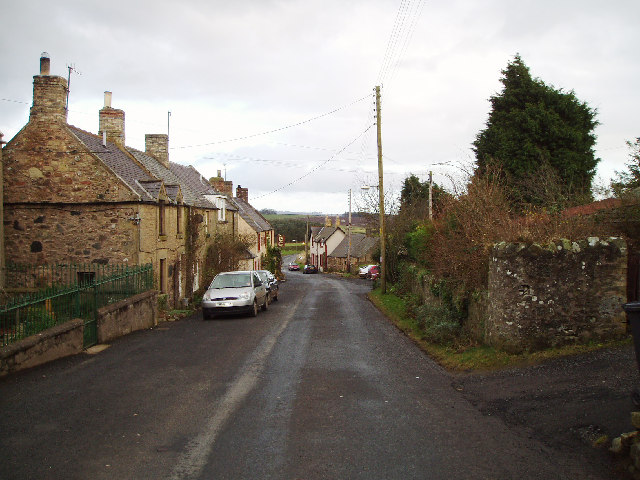

- Location within the Scottish Borders
- OS grid reference: NT850607
- Council area: Scottish Borders
- Lieutenancy area: Berwickshire
- Country: Scotland
- Sovereign state: United Kingdom
- Post town: EYEMOUTH
- Postcode district: TD14
- Dialling code: 01890
- Police: Scotland
- Fire: Scottish
- Ambulance: Scottish
- UK Parliament: Berwickshire, Roxburgh and Selkirk
- Scottish Parliament: Ettrick, Roxburgh and Berwickshire

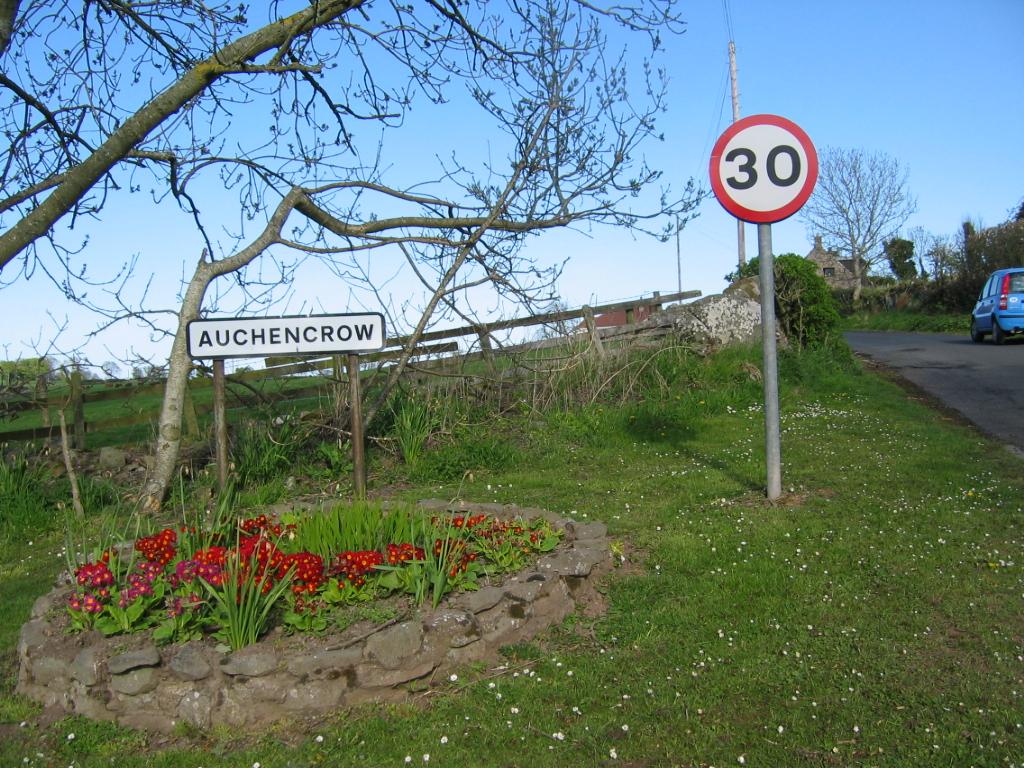

Auchencrow (Scottish Gaelic: Allt na Crà) is a small village in the Scottish Borders area of Scotland, by the Lammermuir range of hills, and near Reston.

== Etymology ==
Around 1210, the village was referred to as Aldenegraue. It had become Aldencraw by the end of the 13th century, then Adincraw by the start of the 17th century, Auchincraw by 1771, and Auchencrow by 1860.

The modern name, Auchencrow, tends to obscure the question of origins. A Gaelic origin is accepted by Watson (1926, 138) and Nicholaisen (1976, 138). It is thought that the meaning is "achadh na crà", or "field of the tree or trees". This is apparently contradicted by the 12th-century name-form 'Alden-’, also preserved, for example, in four 13th-century Durham charters. Mac an Tàilleir suggests the form Aldenacraw may be derived from a name for the watercourse (such as the Gaelic Allt na Crà, "stream of the salmon trap") rather than the settlement itself.

Something like 'Halden's Grave' or 'Halden's Grove' could be nearer the original idea, but it is more natural to use the current name and speak of the village of Auchencrow. This is itself a form only recently derived by folk-etymology from the much longer-running 'Edencraw' or 'Auchencrawe': an evolution from Halden- to Alden- or Eden- to Auchenand from -grove/ -grave too -crawe to -crow.

James Hutton, the founder of modern geology, farmed two miles to the west. A James Hutton Trail was established in 2006.

== Billie Mains and Tower ==
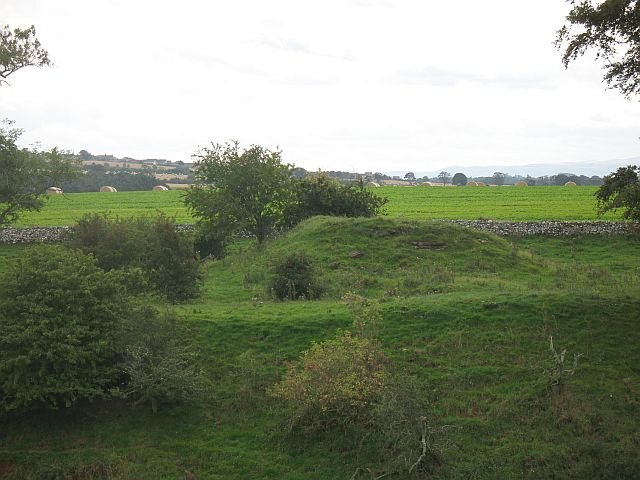
Remains of Billie Tower

South of Auchencrow towards Chirnside, during the war of the Rough Wooing, Billie was burnt in May 1544 during the withdrawal of Lord Hertford's army from Edinburgh. The castle tower, "Byllye tower 9 miles from Berwick on the edge of Lammermore, between Angus's barony of Boncle, and Coldingham" (55.8299°N 2.2400°W), was captured on Candlemas Day (i.e. 2 February) 1548 by the English soldier Thomas Carlile, who overcame the guard with ten companions dressed "in maner of Skottes." He garrisoned the tower with 50 horsemen.

Billie Castle was mentioned with two other neighbouring strongholds Bonkyll Castle and Blanerne Castle in a prophetic rhyme referring to their construction in the time of David I;

Bunkle, Billie and Blanerne
Three castles strong as irne,
Built when Davie was a Bairn,
Theyll all gang doon,

Wi Scotland's Croun
An ilka ane shall be a cairn.

== Berwickshire rhymes ==
Auchencrow and Billie were mentioned in place-name verses recorded in the 19th century;

I stood upon Eyemouth Fort,
And guess ye what I saw,
Ferneyside, and Flemington,
Newhouses, and Cocklaw,
The fairy-folk o' Fosterland,
The witches o' Edencraw,
And the bogle in the Billy-myre.

and among verses referring to witches and warlocks;

Bourtrees, Bees, and Bairns,
Are rife in Auchencraw,
Where in the days o' auld lang syne,
The wives were witches a',
And Jamie Bour the auld gley'd carle,
Was warlock in yon raw.

Although the 19th-century editor considered the latter verse of recent origin, he noted "Jamie Bour" as a reference to the servant of Robert Logan of Restalrig and Fast Castle mentioned in the Gowrie Conspiracy trial in 1608, who had property in the village.

== See also ==
- List of places in the Scottish Borders
- List of places in Scotland
