= List of listed buildings in Kinghorn, Fife =

This is a list of listed buildings in the parish of Kinghorn in Fife, Scotland.

== List ==
Name	Location	Date listed	Grid ref. (Note: Sometimes known as OSGB36, the grid reference (where provided) is based on the British national grid reference system used by the Ordnance Survey. • "Guide to National Grid". Ordnance Survey. • "Get-a-map". Ordnance Survey.)	Geo-coordinates	Notes	LB number (Note: Historic Environment Scotland assign a unique alphanumeric identifier to each designated site in Scotland, for listed buildings this always begins with "LB", for example "LB12345".)	Image
6 Cuinzie Neuk Including Stairway Within To No 7				56°04′14″N 3°10′27″W	Category B	36248	Upload Photo
36 North Overgate				56°04′22″N 3°10′29″W	Category B	36263	Upload Photo
Raith Estate, Heather Lodge				56°06′27″N 3°12′19″W	Category B	9684	Upload Photo
Easter Balbardie House Formerly East Balbardie Farmhouse And Steading				56°05′29″N 3°13′39″W	Category C(S)	9701	Upload Photo
Glassmount Dovecot				56°05′00″N 3°12′48″W	Category B	9705	Upload Photo
21-35 (Odd Nos), High Street, Cross Buildings				56°04′12″N 3°10′28″W	Category B	46842	Upload Photo
2-6 (Even Nos) High Street Including Gatepiers				56°04′14″N 3°10′29″W	Category C(S)	46844	Upload Photo
1 Kilcruik Road Including Gatepiers, Gates And Boundary Walls				56°04′20″N 3°10′40″W	Category B	46847	Upload Photo
Rossland Place, Railway Bridge No 72				56°04′05″N 3°10′32″W	Category C(S)	46858	Upload Photo
St Leonard's Place, Archway Motors, Former St Leonard's Mill				56°04′19″N 3°10′29″W	Category C(S)	46860	Upload Photo
4 St Leonard's Place, Former Gatehouse To St Leonard's Mill Including Boundary Walls				56°04′18″N 3°10′27″W	Category C(S)	46861	Upload Photo
Abden Farm				56°04′35″N 3°10′25″W	Category B	46863	Upload Photo
Kilrie House, Walled Garden				56°05′40″N 3°12′58″W	Category C(S)	46872	Upload Photo
Lambert's Mill Bridge				56°05′46″N 3°14′14″W	Category C(S)	46873	Upload Photo
34 And 36 Nethergate				56°04′12″N 3°10′21″W	Category B	36245	Upload Photo
2-12 (Even Nos) Castle Wyn (Formerly 24 High Street)				56°04′13″N 3°10′30″W	Category C(S)	36249	Upload Photo
25 North Overgate Including Boundary Walls				56°04′20″N 3°10′29″W	Category B	36253	Upload Photo
2 Glamis Road Including Boundary Walls				56°04′21″N 3°10′30″W	Category C(S)	36254	Upload Photo
6, 7 And 9 Townhead And Barclay Road, Including Boundary Walls				56°04′21″N 3°10′36″W	Category C(S)	36257	Upload Photo
Nether Pitteadie (Formerly North Pitteadie Farm) Including Dovecot, Walled Garden And Ancillary Buildings, Gatepiers And Boundary Walls				56°05′41″N 3°12′22″W	Category B	9699	Upload Photo
Kilrie Dovecot				56°05′38″N 3°13′04″W	Category B	9703	Upload Photo
Glamis Road, James Hay Joiner, Former Plash Mill With Ancillary Buildings And Boundary Walls				56°04′20″N 3°10′32″W	Category B	46838	Upload Photo
Harbour Road, Railway Footbridge				56°04′08″N 3°10′29″W	Category C(S)	46839	Upload Photo
14 And 16 North Overgate, Glover's Court Including Boundary Walls				56°04′21″N 3°10′27″W	Category C(S)	46853	Upload Photo
Balmuto Bridge Over Tributary To Tiel Burn				56°05′37″N 3°15′03″W	Category C(S)	46864	Upload Photo
1, 2 And 3 St James Place				56°04′10″N 3°10′21″W	Category C(S)	36243	Upload Photo
28 - 32 (Even Nos) Nethergate And Harbour Road				56°04′12″N 3°10′22″W	Category B	36244	Upload Photo
40 Nethergate, Seagate House				56°04′11″N 3°10′21″W	Category C(S)	36247	Upload Photo
16 And 18 Eastgate Including Boundary Walls				56°04′24″N 3°10′28″W	Category C(S)	36266	Upload Photo
Raith Estate, Coupie Craigs Bridge Over Dronachy Burn				56°06′30″N 3°12′26″W	Category C(S)	9685	Upload Photo
Spanish Cottage And Datie Mill				56°06′28″N 3°11′18″W	Category B	9700	Upload Photo
Inchkeith Island, Lighthouse And Remains Of Inchkeith Fort And Boundary Walls				56°02′01″N 3°08′10″W	Category B	9707	Upload another image
17 Rossland Place, Rossland House				56°04′07″N 3°10′32″W	Category C(S)	46855	Upload Photo
14 Rossland Place				56°04′06″N 3°10′33″W	Category C(S)	46857	Upload Photo
Rossland Place, War Memorial				56°04′08″N 3°10′34″W	Category C(S)	46859	Upload Photo
9 St Leonard's Place And South Overgate, Julian Memorial Hall Including Boundary Walls				56°04′18″N 3°10′25″W	Category C(S)	46862	Upload Photo
Kilrie Gate, East Lodge				56°05′26″N 3°12′47″W	Category C(S)	46871	Upload Photo
Nethergate, Kinghorn Parish Church Of St Leonard (Church Of Scotland)				56°04′11″N 3°10′17″W	Category B	36241	Upload another image
Nethergate, Kinghorn Old Kirk				56°04′12″N 3°10′16″W	Category C(S)	36242	Upload another image
West Balbardie Lodge				56°05′29″N 3°14′40″W	Category C(S)	13003	Upload Photo
Harbour Road, Railway Viaduct				56°04′12″N 3°10′22″W	Category C(S)	46840	Upload another image
1 High Street				56°04′14″N 3°10′27″W	Category C(S)	46841	Upload Photo
35 North Overgate				56°04′21″N 3°10′30″W	Category C(S)	46852	Upload Photo
Drinkbetween Including Boundary Walls, Railings And Gates				56°04′59″N 3°11′09″W	Category C(S)	46868	Upload Photo
30 North Overgate				56°04′22″N 3°10′29″W	Category C(S)	36261	Upload Photo
38 North Overgate And Eastgate				56°04′22″N 3°10′29″W	Category B	36264	Upload Photo
1 And 3 Eastgate Including Boundary Walls				56°04′23″N 3°10′29″W	Category B	36265	Upload Photo
Balmuto Tower Including Boundary, Garden And Terrace Walls And Gatepiers				56°05′38″N 3°15′14″W	Category B	9686	Upload Photo
Grangehill House With Pavilions And Link Walls, Boundary Walls, Gatepiers And Gates				56°04′02″N 3°11′29″W	Category B	9698	Upload Photo
Burntisland Road, Kinghorn Golf Club, Clubhouse Including Boundary Walls				56°03′59″N 3°10′45″W	Category C(S)	46835	Upload Photo
Nethergate, 6 And 7 St Clair's Entry				56°04′11″N 3°10′22″W	Category C(S)	46850	Upload Photo
Nethergate, Kinghorn Parish Church Graveyard With Stones, Boundary Walls, Gatepiers, Gates And Railings				56°04′11″N 3°10′16″W	Category B	46851	Upload Photo
Pettycur Harbour				56°03′45″N 3°10′51″W	Category C(S)	46854	Upload another image See more images
Glassmount Conservatory				56°05′01″N 3°12′48″W	Category A	46869	Upload Photo
Raith Estate, West Balbarton Farmhouse Including Walled Garden				56°06′30″N 3°13′50″W	Category C(S)	46874	Upload Photo
Bruce Terrace, Bowbutts Dovecot				56°04′25″N 3°10′25″W	Category B	36268	Upload Photo
38 Nethergate (3 St Clair's Entry)				56°04′12″N 3°10′21″W	Category B	36246	Upload Photo
Grange House Including Walled Garden, Boundary Walls And Gates				56°05′03″N 3°10′26″W	Category C(S)	9696	Upload Photo
Glassmount Sundial				56°05′02″N 3°12′43″W	Category C(S)	9706	Upload Photo
37-39 (Odd Nos) High Street				56°04′12″N 3°10′29″W	Category C(S)	46843	Upload Photo
Nethergate, 4 St Clair's Entry				56°04′11″N 3°10′22″W	Category B	46849	Upload Photo
4 North Overgate Including Boundary Walls				56°04′20″N 3°10′26″W	Category B	36260	Upload Photo
34 North Overgate				56°04′22″N 3°10′29″W	Category B	36262	Upload Photo
Kinghorn Road, Alexander Iii Monument				56°03′52″N 3°12′00″W	Category B	13639	Upload another image
West Balbardie Including Gatepiers				56°05′32″N 3°14′38″W	Category C(S)	9687	Upload Photo
Inch View, Railway Tunnel No 71A				56°03′57″N 3°10′49″W	Category C(S)	46846	Upload Photo
8 Rossland Place Including Boundary Walls				56°04′07″N 3°10′34″W	Category C(S)	46856	Upload Photo
Banchory Including Walled Garden, Boundary Walls And Gates				56°04′55″N 3°11′24″W	Category C(S)	46865	Upload Photo
Bruce Terrace, Bowbutts House With Ancillary Building				56°04′25″N 3°10′26″W	Category A	36267	Upload Photo
Bruce Terrace, Bowbutts Gatepiers, Gates And Enclosing Boundary Walls				56°04′23″N 3°10′23″W	Category C(S)	36269	Upload Photo
Rossland Place, Public Library And Community Centre (Formerly Kinghorn Primary School)				56°04′05″N 3°10′35″W	Category B	36250	Upload Photo
St Leonard's Place And North Overgate, Town House Including Boundary Walls, Exercise Yard And Railings				56°04′18″N 3°10′26″W	Category B	36251	Upload another image
43 North Overgate				56°04′22″N 3°10′31″W	Category C(S)	36255	Upload Photo
1 Townhead Including Boundary Walls				56°04′22″N 3°10′32″W	Category C(S)	36256	Upload Photo
Townhead, Kilcruik Cottage Including Boundary Walls				56°04′21″N 3°10′38″W	Category C(S)	36258	Upload Photo
2 North Overgate, Viewforth House Including Boundary Walls				56°04′19″N 3°10′26″W	Category B	36259	Upload Photo
Pitteadie Castle Including Walled Garden				56°05′21″N 3°11′42″W	Category B	9697	Upload Photo
Kilrie House Including Gatepiers				56°05′42″N 3°12′52″W	Category B	9702	Upload Photo
Glassmount House				56°05′02″N 3°12′46″W	Category C(S)	9704	Upload Photo
Inchkeith Island, Memorial To Lord Herbert Of Lea				56°01′58″N 3°08′10″W	Category C(S)	9708	Upload Photo
1 - 5 Cuinzie Neuk And Tron Gate				56°04′14″N 3°10′27″W	Category C(S)	46836	Upload Photo
20 Eastgate				56°04′24″N 3°10′28″W	Category C(S)	46837	Upload Photo
4 Kilcruik Road, The Manse Including Boundary Walls				56°04′22″N 3°10′43″W	Category B	46848	Upload Photo
Banchory Farm, Grieves House With Ancillary Buildings				56°04′54″N 3°11′18″W	Category C(S)	46866	Upload Photo
Craigencalt Farm Ecology Centre, Former Mill Building, Steading, The Hermitage And Ancillary Building				56°04′30″N 3°11′32″W	Category C(S)	46867	Upload Photo
Glassmount Steading With Boundary Walls And Gatepiers				56°05′01″N 3°12′52″W	Category B	46870	Upload Photo

== Key ==
The scheme for classifying buildings in Scotland is:

- Category A: "buildings of national or international importance, either architectural or historic; or fine, little-altered examples of some particular period, style or building type."
- Category B: "buildings of regional or more than local importance; or major examples of some particular period, style or building type, which may have been altered."
- Category C: "buildings of local importance; lesser examples of any period, style, or building type, as originally constructed or moderately altered; and simple traditional buildings which group well with other listed buildings."

In March 2016 there were 47,288 listed buildings in Scotland. Of these, 8% were Category A, and 50% were Category B, with the remaining 42% being Category C.

== See also ==
- List of listed buildings in Fife
