= Cushnie Castle =

Coordinates: 57.1873°N 2.7958°W

Cushnie Castle was a 16th-century tower house, about 6 miles (9.7 km) south west of Alford, Aberdeenshire, Scotland, near Cushnie Burn, in the Glen of Cushnie.

Cushnie Lodge is a later construction, dating from 1707.

== History ==
The land had been held by the Cusnie family from the 12th century or earlier. The Leslies acquired it by marriage early in the 14th century, before passing to the Lumsdens in 1628, or, on the basis of a coat of arms, 1618.

== Structure ==
There are few remains of the original castle, apart from a vault.

Cushnie Lodge is a two-storey, L-plan tower house. It is harled, and has corbie-stepped gables. There is a roll-moulded doorway in the re-entrant angle. The house was altered in the 19th century.

== See also ==
- Castles in Great Britain and Ireland
- List of castles in Scotland
