= John Scrimgeour (minister) =

Scottish Presbyterian minister (c1568-1634)

Personal details
- Born: various spellings John or Johne, Scrimger or Scrimgeour c1568
- Died: 1634
- Denomination: Church of Scotland

John Scrimgeour, was a Presbyterian minister at Kinghorn in Fife. He went as a minister with King James to Denmark, when the monarch went there to fetch home Anne, his young bride to be. He is best remembered for his opposition to the Five Articles of Perth. He would not for example observe holy days other than the sabbath and would not have his congregation take the knee for communion; this led to his being deposed from the ministry of the church. He is also remembered having a verbal exchange with John Spottiswoode in which the archbishop is recorded as saying about King James "I tell you, Mr Johne, the king is Pope now, and so sail be." to which Scrimgeour is said to have replied: "It is an evill [title ?] ye give him." Scrimgeour was banned from taking church services, put out of his parish and put under house arrest but nevertheless he did occasionally help officiate at communion services.

== Life ==
John Scrimgeour of Wester Bowhill, Auchterderran, born about 1567, was the son of William Scrimgeour of Myres. He was proposed for Auchtermuchty on 22 June 1592. He was a minister without charge in Presbytery of Dundee 5 November 1602. He was admitted to Dysart before 1604 and translated and admitted to Kinghorn Easter before 26 February 1606. When the six brethren were tried at Linlithgow 10 January 1606 for holding the General Assembly at Aberdeen in opposition to the King's command, he accompanied them to their trial and went to prison with them. At the Synod in August 1607 he opposed the Archbishop taking the chair in right of his office. For this he was confined to his parish by Royal command 24 September but was afterwards allowed freedom within the bounds of the Presbytery, and was relieved from his confinement 28 July 1614. He joined in a Protest with fifty-four other ministers for the Liberties of the Kirk 27 June 1617, and in the next year at the General Assembly at Perth, he boldly, though not a member, opposed the Five Articles and tendered reasons against each of them. He was cited before the Court of High Commission on 26 January 1620, for not observing holy days and not administering the Communion in conformity with the conclusions of the Perth Assembly, and compearing, was deprived on 1 March that year of all function in the Kirk and ordered to be, within six days, confined to his own house of Wester Bowhill. Notwithstanding this he preached in his own pulpit on the day appointed for the admission of his successor and on two other occasions. He died at Wester Bowhill in 1634, bequeathing fifty merks to the poor of the parish.

== John Livingstone's tribute ==
John Scrimger, was a minister at Kinghorn. One of his contemporaries, John Livingstone left a biography which, with some editing and modernising, said:

He went as a minister with King James to Denmark, when he went there to fetch home Queen Anna. He was described as a man rude-like in his clothing, and some of his behaviour and expressions but he was of a deep reach, of a natural wit, very learned, especially in the Hebrew language, who oft wished most part of books to be burnt except the Bible and clear notes on it: one of a most tender loving heart, especially fitted to comfort such as were cast down. His expressions in preaching seemed sometimes too familiar, but always very pressing. I heard that he told some intimate friends, that having before some children taken away by death, and having a young daughter which he loved dearly who took the disease called scrofula, and had several running sores, especially one great one in her arm, and was at the point of death, so as one night he was called up to see her die: "I went out," said he, "to the fields in the night, being in great anxiety, and began to expostulate with God, in a fit of great displeasure, and said, 'Thou knowest, O Lord, I have been serving thee in the uprightness of mine heart, according to my measure, and thou seest I take pleasure in this child, and cannot obtain such a thing as that at thy hand;' with other such expressions, as I dare not again utter for all the world, for I was in great bitterness, and at last it was said to me, 'I have heard thee at this time, but use not such boldness in time coming, for such particulars;' and when I came back, the child was sitting up in the bed fully healed, taking some food, and when I looked her arm, it was quite healed." He was by the Bishops deposed, and put from Kinghorn, and lived the rest of his days in the parish of Achterderran, but preached several times in the Edinburgh Castle, at Larbert, and elsewhere. A little before his death I went to see him at his own house in Achterdeeren. He was troubled with kidney stone disease, and several times forced to go to another room for rendering urine, and all the time was made to cry out bitterly for pain. One time when he came back to me, he said, "Joannes, I have been a rude, stunkard man all my days, and now by this pain, the Lord is breaking-me-in to make me as a lamb before he take me home to himself."

== Family ==
He married Grizel, daughter and co-heiress of Robert Forrester of Boquhan, who survived him, and had issue —

- James of Wester Gartmore (who married Margaret daughter of John Melville of Raith and his wife Margaret).
- Henry;
- Gilbert;
- Isabella;
- Christian;
- Helen

== Bibliography ==
- Reg. Mag. Sig., vii., 488
- G. R. Hornings, xxviii., 43
- G. R. Inhib., xxvi., 43
- St Andrews Tests.
- G. R. Sas., xxxii. 40, xlvi. 279
- Reg. of Deeds, lxii., 192
- Calderwood's Hist., vi. 454, 457, 678, vii. 256 et seq.
- Fleming's Fulfill, of Scripture
- Fraser's Melville Book, i., 189
- Livingston's Characteristics
- Fife Sas., ii., 153
