= Kinghorn Town Hall =

Municipal building in Kinghorn, Scotland

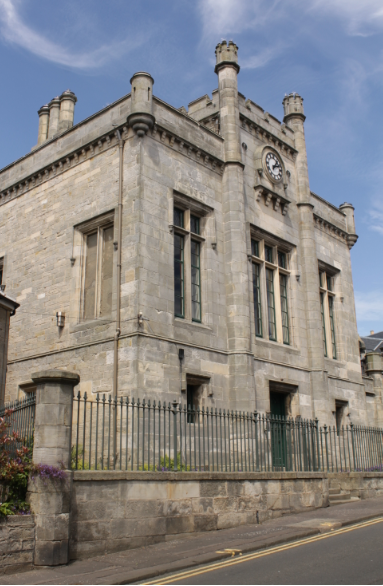
- Kinghorn Town Hall

- Shown in Fife
- 56.0718°N 3.1739°W
- Location: St Leonard's Place, Kinghorn

History
- Built: 1830

Site notes
- Architect: Thomas Hamilton
- Architectural style: Tudor Revival style

Listed Building – Category B
- Official name: St Leonard's Place And North Overgate, Town House Including Boundary Walls, Exercise Yard And Railings
- Designated: 24 November 1972
- Reference no.: LB36251

Kinghorn Town Hall is a municipal building in St Leonard's Place, Kinghorn, Fife, Scotland. The structure, which is used as holiday accommodation for tourists, is a Category B listed building. Designed by Thomas Hamilton in the Tudor Revival style, it was completed in 1830 and served as the meeting place of the burgh council until 1975.

== History ==
The first municipal building in Kinghorn was a small Saxon or Norman church, St Leonard's Chapel, which was converted into a town house and prison in the 16th century. Several Covenanters were incarcerated in the building, which was described as "horrible", during the Killing Time in the early 1680s. It served as the regular meeting place of the burgh council and became known as St Leonard's Tower, but was struck by lightning in the early 19th century and was subsequently demolished.

The current building was designed by Thomas Hamilton in the Tudor Revival style, built in ashlar stone and was completed in 1830. The design involved a symmetrical main frontage of three bays facing into St Leonard's Place. The central bay was formed by a three-stage tower which featured a square headed doorway with a hood mould in the first stage, a tri-partite mullioned and transomed window in the second stage and a corbelled clock face in the third stage. The centre bay was flanked by full-height buttresses surmounted by pinnacles. The outer bays were fenestrated by small square windows with hood moulds on the ground floor and bi-partite mullioned and transomed windows on the first floor. There was also a single-storey wing extending to the northeast. At roof level there was a parapet with corbelled turrets at the outer corners. Internally, the principal rooms were the barrel vaulted prison cells and the guardroom on the ground floor, and the courtroom on the first floor. The courtroom, which also served as a council chamber, featured an ogee-headed fireplace and contained some fine decorative plasterwork.

In the mid-20th century, offices for the town clerk and other council officers were established in Baliol Street. The town hall continued to serve as the meeting place of the burgh council for much of the 20th century, but ceased to be the local seat of government after the enlarged Kirkcaldy District Council was formed in 1975.

The building was acquired by the Fife Historic Buildings Trust in anticipation of a major programme of restoration works, which was managed by the trust and was completed in 2009. The upper floors of the building were converted into holiday apartments for tourists, while the ground floor became the head office of the Fife Historic Buildings Trust in December 2013.

== See also ==
- List of listed buildings in Kinghorn, Fife
