= William Barron Coutts =

Scottish physicist

- Born: 26 May 1885; Kinghorn, Fife, Scotland
- Died: 16 December 1946 (aged 61); Oxford, England
- Other name: Willie Coutts
- Education: University of Edinburgh
- Scientific career
- Fields: physics, military science

Prof William Barron Coutts FRSE (26 May 1885 – 16 December 1946) was a Scottish physicist specialising in military science. He was generally referred to as Willie Coutts.

== Life ==
He was born at the family home of Green Croft in Kinghorn, Fife on 26 May 1885, the son of Elizabeth Martin Barron and Robert Alexander Coutts, a bank accountant. He attended Kirkcaldy High School until 1903.

Originally accepted to study Latin and mathematics at the University of Edinburgh in 1904, after limited success in these fields he transferred to study natural philosophy (physics) as part of a broader science degree, again with only partial success. However, he graduated MA in science in 1909. After university he taught at George Heriot's School in Edinburgh. In 1912 he received a further BSc (Pure) by the University of Edinburgh. During this period in Edinburgh he lived in a flat at 125 Warrender Park Road. In 1913 he was elected a Fellow of the Royal Society of Edinburgh, his proposers were Ralph Allan Sampson, John Brown Clark, Cargill Gilston Knott and James Robert Milne.

In the First World War he was commissioned as a lieutenant in the Royal Garrison Artillery on 24 November 1915, serving in Gibraltar in the role of coastal defence.

During the war he had begun to specialise in trajectory paths, range-finding and optics and obtained a post as a senior lecturer at the Artillery College within the Royal Military Academy, Woolwich near London. After the war (from 1919) he was awarded a full Professorship in Military Science, a role which he continued until 1946, shortly before he died.

In 1926 he was elected a Fellow of the Royal Astronomical Society, his address then was given as 74 Vanburgh Park, Blackheath, London.

He died at Radcliffe Infirmary in Oxford on 16 December 1946.

== Family ==
He was married to Isabella Muirhead Allen (1884–1973). She was from Chorlton near Manchester in England.
