= Stevenson House, East Lothian =

Scottish mansion house

- Interactive map of the Stevenson House, East Lothian area

General information
- Location: Haddington, East Lothian, Scotland

Inventory of Gardens and Designed Landscapes in Scotland
- Official name: Stevenson House
- Designated: 30 June 1987
- Reference no.: GDL00347
- Coordinates: 55°57′51″N 2°43′52″W

Stevenson House is a mansion near the town of Haddington, East Lothian, Scotland.

== History ==
The estate was once owned by the William Douglas of Straboc before being purchased by the Sinclair family in 1624.

A castle may have existing at the site prior to the current mansion house. On 16 May 1544 a residence was destroyed after the burning of Edinburgh by Lord Hertford during the Rough Wooing. It was rebuilt in 1560 and the current mansion house incorporates that building.
