= Clan Lumsden =

Lowland Scottish clan

- Crest: Issuant from a crest coronet Or a naked arm grasping a sword Proper
- Motto: Amor Patitur Moras (Love endures delays)

Profile
- Region: Borders
- District: Berwickshire

Chief
- Gillem Lumsden of that Ilk and Blanerne
- Chief of the Name and Arms of Lumsden
- Seat: Stapely House, Berkshire
- Historic seat: Blanerne Castle
- Last Chief: Gillem Lumsden of that Ilk
Clan branches
Lumsden of Blanerne (chiefs)
Lumsden of Airdrie
Lumsden of Innergellie
Lumsden of Stravithie
Lumsden of Lathallan
Lumsden of Rennyhill
Lumsden of Cushnie-Lumsden
Lumsden of Tillycairn
Lumsden of Clova
Lumsden of Auchindoir
Burgess-Lumsdens
Lumsden of Balmedie
Lumsden of Belhelvie
Lumsden of Sluie
Lumsden of Banchory

Clan Lumsden is a Border Scottish clan.

== History ==
=== Origins of the clan ===
The manor of Lumsden is first mentioned when Edgar, King of Scotland, son of Malcolm III of Scotland, refounded Coldingham Priory in the county of Berwick, endowing it with the villages of Swinewood, Renton, Lumsdene and Coldingham. The first people recorded to have possessed Easter and Wester Lumsden, were Gillem and Cren de Lummisden, who between 1166 and 1182, attested a charter by Waldeve, Earl of Dunbar to Coldingham Priory. Between 1249 and 1262 Gilbert de Lumisden appears as a witness to charters.

In 1296 the common ancestor of the Lumsdens, Adam de Lumsden of that Ilk and his son, Roger de Lummesdene, both appear on the Ragman Rolls, with the given spelling variations, giving homage to Edward I of England. The first recognised chief of Clan Lumsden who descended from Adam was Gilbert, who married the heiress of Blanerne, as evidenced by a charter of 15 June 1329. Later he adopted her crest of a white-tailed eagle devouring a salmon and this crest is still used by the armigerous Fife branch of the clan.

Gilbert's eldest son was another Gilbert from whom descend the Lumsden or Lumsdaine families of Blanerne, Airdrie, Innergellie, Stravithie, Lathallan and Rennyhill. Gilbert's younger son was Thomas who held the lands of Drum and Conland in Fife as well as East and West Medlar, or Cushnie in Aberdeenshire as confirmed in a charter of 1353. From Thomas descend the Lumsden families of Cushnie-Lumsden, Tillycairn, Clova and Auchindoir. The Burgess-Lumsden family descend through a female line and the more recent Lumsden branches of Balmedie, Belhelvie, Sluie and Banchory belong to cadet branches of this family.

=== 17th century, Thirty Years' War and Civil War ===
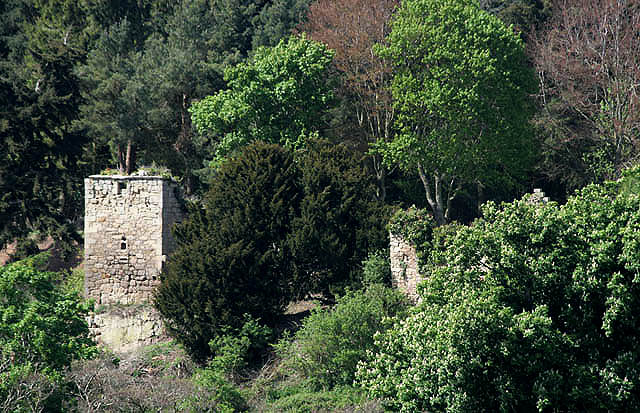
The ruins of Blanerne Castle, historic seat of the chiefs of Clan Lumsden.

In 1672 the senior line of Lumsden did not register their arms, although two cadet branches of Alexander Lumsden of Cushnie and Sir James Lumsden of Innergellie did register their arms. Today there are thirteen Lumsden families who bear arms who are all descended from either Alexander or Sir James.

James Lumsden served under Gustavus Adolphus, the king of Sweden during the Thirty Years' War. Later he and his brother, William, returned to Scotland to fight for the royalists during the Scottish Civil War, after the Battle of Marston Moor in 1644. The Lumsdens of Cushnie were barons of the north who sat in Parliament.

=== 18th century and Jacobite risings ===
During the Jacobite rising of 1745, Andrew Lumsden, who was grandson of Bishop Andrew Lumsden, the primate of Scotland in the Episcopal Church, was secretary to Charles Edward Stuart. After the Battle of Culloden he was attained and fled to Rome where he became secretary and later Secretary of State to James Francis Edward Stuart (the Old Pretender). When the Old Pretender died in 1766, Lumsden rejoined Prince Charles until 1768. In 1773 he returned to Scotland and was fully pardoned in 1778 by the Hanoverian government. His tartan waistcoat has been preserved at Pitcaple Castle.

== Castles and clan seat ==
- Blanerne Castle in Berwickshire, was acquired in the fourteenth century and was the main clan seat.
- Pitcaple Castle in Cushnie, Alford.
- Tillycairn Castle in Cluny, Aberdeenshire.

== See also ==
- Scottish clan
