= John Constable (MP died 1550s) =

English Member of Parliament

John Constable was an English Member of Parliament for Nottinghamshire in April 1554.

In May 1544, he took part in Lord Hertford's attack on Edinburgh, the first major action of the war known as the Rough Wooing. He was captain of 112 men and a Provost Marshal in the army. He was knighted at Leith.
