= Kirkcaldy High School =

Coordinates: 56.1315°N 3.1675°W

- Kirkcaldy, Fife; Scotland

Information
- Type: Secondary
- Motto: Usque Conabor (I will try my utmost)
- Established: 1852; 174 years ago
- Rector: Chris McKay
- Teaching staff: 90 (approx.)
- Enrollment: 1,400 (approx.)
- Colours: navy, blue and gold
- Website: Official Website

Kirkcaldy High School is a 6-year co-educational comprehensive state school in Kirkcaldy, Fife, Scotland.

== History ==
The school was established in 1852 as Kirkcaldy Burgh School. The "High School" name dates from the middle part of the 19th century. The school's motto is Usque conabor, "I will strive to my utmost".

The High School was originally on St Brycedale Avenue and part of the old building is now incorporated into Kirkcaldy College. In 1958 a new school was built on Dunnikier Way in the shape of a 'H' and opened by Queen Elizabeth II. In 1970 the last entrance exams for the school were taken after, which pupils were zoned into their nearest high school. The following year Templehall High School (about half a mile away) became the "Junior" building of the High School originally accommodating 1st, 2nd & 3rd year pupils (later just 1st and 2nd years). The original high school became home for the seniors. As requirements changed over the years the senior school was extended and pupil numbers declined. The requirement for two buildings was no longer necessary. In 1994 the junior building was closed and demolished; the site is now occupied by a housing estate.

The most recent inspection of the school took place in 2012. The reports stated that the school was making good progress with its goals and identified strengths: pupils who were proud of their school and positive about learning, high achievement in out-of-class learning, high quality pastoral care, very good community partnership working, staff who listened to and involved pupils, and the headteacher's leadership of an improving school.

In March 2014, the school won the COSLA (Convention of Scottish Local Authorities) Excellence Award for its work in relation to teenage sexual health and pregnancy prevention. Working with NHS Fife, the school was recognised as being an example of best practice in this field.

Later in 2014, Kirkcaldy High School was shortlisted as a finalist in the Scottish Education Awards 2014 in the Health and Wellbeing section and selected as the "Kingdom FM" Best School. in their "Local Hero" Awards in August 2014.

During 2015–2016, the school was involved in promoting STEM education (science, technology, engineering and maths), with a staff member recognised as UK STEM Teacher of the Year, the school winning the Scottish finals of the Engineering Development Trust's "Go4SET" competition and another finalist place in the Scottish Education Awards.

On 22 February 2017, the school received a visit from Stonewall Ambassador Ian McKellen. He spoke to the S6 about his experiences before having lunch with the school LGBT+ Group. McKellen was given a Kirkclady High School tie, and wore it on The Graham Norton Show.

In 2018, the school won a second COSLA Excellence Award for their work tackling LGBT+ bullying and promoting equality across the school as well as taking training to a number of local and national organisations.

In 2020, the school was awarded "Gold" status as a UNICEF "Rights Respecting School" and was awarded the "Gold" Charter by LGBT Youth Scotland.

== House system ==
The pupils of Kirkcaldy High School are organised into four different houses. Originally the house system was named after areas of Kirkcaldy – Balwearie, Raith, Ravenscraig and St. Serfs. Later the houses were named after famous persons of the town.

- Beveridge (red) - Named after a prominent Kirkcaldy family, and linoleum manufacturer.
- Adam Smith (purple) – Named after the economist who wrote The Wealth of Nations and attended the school in the eighteenth century.
- Carlyle (blue) – Named after the writer Thomas Carlyle who taught at the school between 1816 and 1818.
- Oswald (green) – Named after an old Kirkcaldy family, at one time associated with the Dunnikier estate, on which the school is now sited.

Now the houses were named after castles in the area.

- MacDuff (purple)
- Seafield (green)
- Ravenscraig (blue)
- Wemyss (red)

== Notable former pupils ==
- Gordon Aikman, motor neurone disease campaigner
- Gordon Brown, former prime minister of the United Kingdom
- John Buchan, author
- David Raitt Robertson Burt, zoologist
- Bob Carruthers, filmmaker and author
- Harry Colville, footballer
- William Barron Coutts FRSE, military scientist
- Ewan Dow, politician
- Douglas Dryburgh, Olympic curler
- Murray Elder, Baron Elder, life peer and political chief of staff
- Robert Fyfe, actor
- Harry Gourlay, politician
- John Grahl, economist
- Sandy Hinshelwood, rugby international
- Archie Howie, physicist
- Bob Howie, rugby international
- Dave Howie, rugby international
- William Oliphant Hutchison, painter
- Jackie Leven, musician
- Val McDermid, novelist
- Alan Ormrod, cricketer
- Richard Park, broadcaster
- Aileen Paterson, author
- Harry Ritchie, author
- Meg Ritchie, Olympic athlete
- Anneila Sargent, astronomer
- Adam Smith, economist
- Shirley-Anne Somerville, politician
- R.C. Stevenson, rugby player
- Melissa Terras, professor
- Brian Thomson, journalist
- Andrew Weir, 1st Baron Inverforth, industrialist
- Bertha Wilson, Canadian Supreme Court Judge
