= Christopher Morris (soldier) =

Sir Christopher Morris
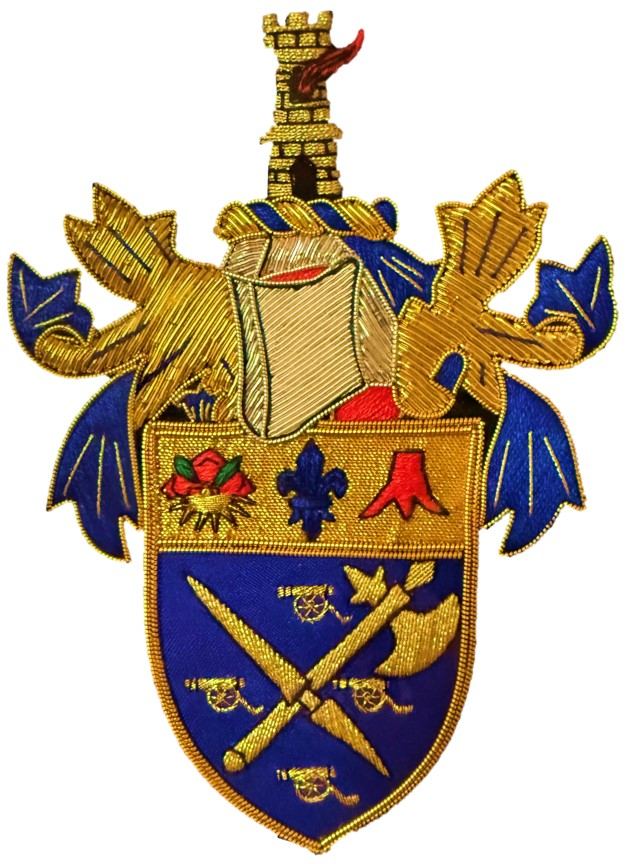
- Sir Christopher's Coat of Arms, Granted 15 November 1538 (location: Private Collection)
- Born: c. 1490; London, England
- Died: 3 September 1544 (aged 53–54); Boulogne, France
- Cause of death: Struck in Action
- Burial place: St Peter upon Cornhill, London
- Spouse: Eliza Clifford
- Military career
- Allegiance: England
- Branch: Board of Ordnance; Henry VIII's Expeditionary Forces
- Service years: 1513–1544
- Rank: General (Master of the Ordnance)
- Commands: Master Gunner of England (1537) Master-General of the Ordnance (1544)
- Conflicts: Battle of the Spurs Pilgrimage of Grace Sieges of Boulogne (1544–1546) Burning of Edinburgh

Sir Christopher Morris (or Morrys, Morice or Mores; c. 1490 – 3 September 1544) was an English gunner, general, military administrator, commissioner, and diplomat during the reign of Henry VIII. He served as Master Gunner of England in 1537 and promoted to Master of the Ordnance on 28 April 1544 until his death in September 1544.

== Family and Knighting ==
Sir Christopher Morris, is the son of William Mores (Morris), who served as Sergeant of the Hall to King Henry VII. William had fifteen children, ten sons and five daughters. His brother, John Morris served as Master of the Bench at the Inner Temple with Thomas Audley, 1st Baron Audley of Walden and Member of Parliament in 1529, alongside William FitzWilliam, 1st Earl of Southampton and Richard Rich, 1st Baron Rich. Sir Christopher's sister, Elizabeth married Sir Richard Delabere, whose first wife was Anne Audley, the daughter of John Touchet.

Sir Christopher Morris married to Eliza Clifford on 18 June 1543, of Baron de Clifford family, but no children were recorded. Fitzwilliam also married a Clifford. His wife, Lady Morris died in 1551 and was interred at St Olave Old Jewry. On 15 November 1538, Christopher was knighted by King Henry VIII. Sir Christopher was granted Arms by the College that same year.

Arms: Azure, a battle-axe in bend sinister surmounted by a tilting-spear in bend dexter Or, headed Argent, between four cannons of the second.

Crest: A tower Or, inflamed Gules

His nephew was Richard Morris, a London merchant and Master of the Worshipful Company of Ironmongers, who was issued the coat of arms: "Vert, a buck trippant Or," Morris's daughter Mary Morris married Sir William Cockayne, and secondly to Henry Carey, 1st Earl of Dover, becoming Countess of Dover.

Lewis Morris, Governor of New York and Lord the Manor of Morrisania from Tintern, Monmouthshire, Wales was known to utilize a similar crest to Sir Christopher, "A castle in flames, Proper." Although no connection has been fully established.

== Career ==
Sir Christopher Morris was probably born about 1490. On 4 December 1513 he was made gunner in the Tower of London, with a salary of 12d. a day, and the appointment was confirmed on 14 August 1514. In the following March, Morris was serving at Tournai, but soon returned to his post at the Tower, where he apparently remained until the summer of 1522. He was on board one of the vessels which, under Thomas Howard, Earl of Surrey's command, escorted Charles V to Biscay after his visit to England in 1522; in July a detachment with artillery was landed on the coast of France near Morlaix, which was captured, "for the master gunner, Christopher Morris, having certain falcons, with the shot of one of them struck the lock of the wicket in the gate, so that it flew open," and the town was taken.

In August 1523 Morris was acting as lieutenant-gunner before Calais, and on the 23rd of that month he sailed with the vice-admiral, Sir William Fitzwilliam (later Earl of Southampton), and landed near Treport; after severe fighting they re-embarked, burning seven ships and capturing twenty-seven pieces of ordnance.

In April 1524 Morris was at Valenciennes in charge of the ordnance; in the same year he was appointed "overseer of ordnance," and commissioned to search the Isle of Thanet for the goods of a Portuguese vessel that had been beached there.

Between 1524 and 1527 Morris was employed in diplomatic work on behalf of Henry VIII; at the end of 1526 or beginning of 1527 he was sent with letters to the English envoys at Valladolid, and started back with their dispatches on 1 February 1526–7. In the same year he was appointed Chief Gunner of the Tower, and in September was bearer of instructions to William Knight, the envoy at Compiègne.

In 1530 he served in Ireland, and in January 1530–1 before Calais; in the same year he inspected the mines at Llantrisant, Glamorganshire, as the king's commissioner, and appears as owner of a ship. After serving on a commission to survey the land and fortifications of Calais and Guisnes, commanding a company of artillery at the former place, and inspecting the fortifications of Carlisle in 1532, Morris was in 1535 despatched on a mission to North Germany and Denmark, probably to enlist gunners and engineers in the English service. He visited Hamburg, Lübeck, Rostock, and all the principal towns in Denmark and Zealand, returning on 27 June.

In August 1535, Morris was at Greenwich, engaged in enlisting men, and in September was ordered to proceed with three ships to Denmark; the order was, however, countermanded, and Morris was again sent to Calais. On 8 February 1537, he succeeded Bernardin de Valois (Bernardyne de Wallys) as Master of the Ordnance, with a salary of 2s. a day for himself, 6d. for a clerk, and 6d. for a yeoman. Before October he was recalled, and was in London ready to march northwards to assist in suppressing the Pilgrimage of Grace.

In 1537 Morris was again at Carlisle inspecting the fortifications, which had been declared unsound. He was granted license to be "overseer of the science of artillery", appointed master gunner of England, and on 31 July landed at Calais. In 1539 he was appointed to attend the Lord Admiral William FitzWilliam, 1st Earl of Southampton at the reception of Anne of Cleves.

In 1542 Morris was in England superintending the artillery, not always with success, for of the pieces dispatched for the war in Scotland in October 1542 all but one burst. In March 1543–4 he joined Edward Seymour, Earl of Hertford's expedition to Scotland. Landing near Leith, which was immediately captured, Morris accompanied the army to Edinburgh, where on 7 May he blew in the Netherbow Port with a culverin; the next day he bombarded Edinburgh Castle, without effect, for two hours and was compelled to retreat.

== Death ==
In the fall of 1544 Morris was serving as Chief Director of the Batteries in Boulogne, France, where on 3 September he received a wound, which proved fatal. He was buried in St Peter's Church, Cornhill, London. Elizabeth, Lady Morris died in 1551 and was buried 22 May at St Olave Old Jewry.

== Notes ==
Attribution

Military offices
Preceded by Bernardin de Valois	Master-General of the Ordnance; 1544	Succeeded by Sir Thomas Seymour
