= John Grahl =

Scottish academic and professor

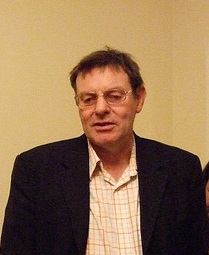
John Grahl

John Grahl (born 24 August 1946) is a Scottish academic and professor.

== Life ==
Grahl was brought-up in Burntisland, Fife, and was educated at Kirkcaldy High School between 1957 and 1964. He gained a master's degree in economics from the University of Edinburgh before moving to London where he gained a second masters in economics from Queen Mary, University of London.

He was a lecturer at Queen Mary and Westfield College, and London Metropolitan University, and became Professor of European Integration in the Human Resources Department at Middlesex University.

Grahl is a member of the working group for an 'Alternative Economic Policy in Europe', and author of 'European Monetary Union: Problems of Legitimacy, Development and Stability' (Kogan Page, London, 2001), and After Maastricht: a Guide to European Monetary Union (Lawrence and Wishart, London, 1997). He has published articles on economics in the left wing 'New Left Review' and the French monthly 'Le Monde Diplomatique'.

Grahl lives in Newham, East London, and is married with four children and three grandchildren.

== Selected publications ==
- Global finance and social Europe. 2009.
- European Monetary Union: Problems of Legitimacy, Development and Stability (2001)
- After Maastricht: a Guide to European Monetary Union (1997)
