= Blanerne Castle =

Castle and tower house in Scottish Borders, Scotland

Coordinates: 55.8002°N 2.2701°W

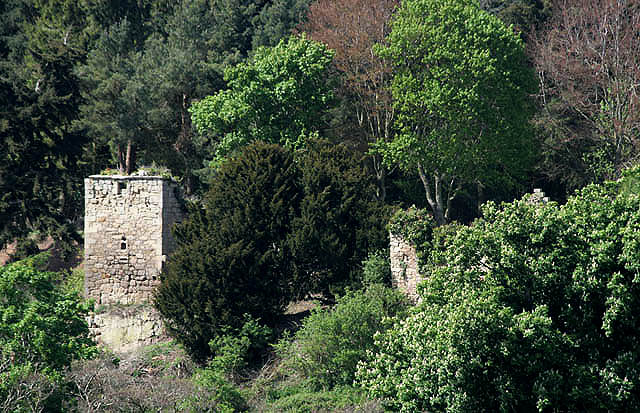
Ruins of Blanerne Castle

Blanerne Castle is the remains of a 16th-century fortified house, located in the grounds of Blanerne House, an 18th-century country house between Chirnside and Preston in the Scottish Borders. The house and castle sit on the north bank of the Whiteadder Water, around 6 kilometres (3.7 mi) north-east of Duns.

The castle was the historical seat of the Lumsdaine family for over four centuries. The surviving remains are dated to the 16th century, although the site may have been occupied as far back as the 12th century. The remains include a keep or kitchen block, with a detached guard house to the west. The castle is protected as a Scheduled Ancient Monument.

A popular Berwickshire rhyme refers to the medieval strengths of Blanerne and the nearby fortresses of Billie Castle, and Bonkyll Castle referring to their construction in the time of David I and their destruction following the Rough wooing:

Bunkle, Billie and Blanerne
Three castles strong as airn
Built when Davie was a Bairn
Theyll all gang doon,
Wi Scotland's Croon
An ilka ane shall be a cairn

== Blanerne House ==
Blanerne House was constructed in the 18th century. Around 1830, plans for the house were prepared by the architect William Burn, although these may not have been carried out. A major fire in 1895 led to the rebuilding in 1897 of the house in its present form. It is currently operated as a guest house, offering access to fishing and game shooting.

The house is a category B listed building

== See also ==
- List of places in the Scottish Borders
- List of places in Scotland
