= List of listed buildings in Coldingham, Scottish Borders =

This is a list of listed buildings in the parish of Coldingham in the Scottish Borders, Scotland.

== List ==
Name	Location	Date Listed	Grid Ref. (Note: Sometimes known as OSGB36, the grid reference (where provided) is based on the British national grid reference system used by the Ordnance Survey. • "Guide to National Grid". Ordnance Survey. • "Get-a-map". Ordnance Survey.)	Geo-coordinates	Notes	LB Number (Note: Historic Environment Scotland assign a unique alphanumeric identifier to each designated site in Scotland, for listed buildings this always begins with "LB", for example "LB12345".)	Image
Coldingham, Coldingham Priory (Church Of Scotland) Including Transept Arch, Former Hearse House And Gravedigger's Store, Graveyard, Boundary Walls, Gatepiers And Gates				55°53′12″N 2°09′23″W	Category A	4059	Upload another image See more images
Press Castle, Dovecot				55°52′53″N 2°12′27″W	Category B	4102	Upload Photo
St Abb's Head, Lighthouse Including Foghorn, Foghorn Engine House, Boundary Walls And Stair				55°54′59″N 2°08′18″W	Category B	4103	Upload Photo
Coldingham, Paradise, Glencourt Including Garden Walls				55°53′10″N 2°09′29″W	Category C(S)	62	Upload Photo
Auchencrow, The Craw Inn				55°50′21″N 2°14′13″W	Category C(S)	46593	Upload Photo
Butterdean Farmhouse Including Ancillary Structures, Walled Garden, Boundary Walls And Gatepiers				55°52′30″N 2°19′23″W	Category C(S)	46594	Upload Photo
Coldingham, Eyemouth Road, Bonardub Including Ancillary Structure And Gatepiers				55°53′04″N 2°09′18″W	Category C(S)	46602	Upload Photo
Coldingham, Law House				55°53′03″N 2°08′55″W	Category C(S)	46607	Upload Photo
Coldingham, School Road, Courtburn House Including Ancillary Structure, Boundary Walls, Gatepiers And Gates				55°53′14″N 2°09′34″W	Category C(S)	46613	Upload Photo
Grantshouse, Honbu Cottage				55°53′00″N 2°17′46″W	Category B	46626	Upload Photo
Greenburn Farmhouse Including Garden Walls				55°50′19″N 2°15′33″W	Category C(S)	46628	Upload Photo
Reston, Main Street, Cruachan Including Ancillary Structure, Boundary Walls, Railings And Gate				55°51′08″N 2°11′26″W	Category C(S)	46647	Upload Photo
Reston, Main Street, St Mary's Villa And Culblean Including Ancillary Structure, Boundary Walls, Railings, Gatepiers And Gates				55°51′09″N 2°11′33″W	Category C(S)	46651	Upload Photo
St Abb's Head, The Ranger's House And Office				55°54′13″N 2°08′38″W	Category C(S)	46663	Upload Photo
Shawbraes Farmhouse Including Garden Walls				55°51′18″N 2°13′07″W	Category B	46664	Upload Photo
Coldingham, Bogan, Holmleigh				55°53′17″N 2°09′23″W	Category C(S)	43376	Upload Photo
Coldingham, Bogangreen House Including Stable Block, Walled Garden, Boundary Walls, Quadrant Walls And Gatepiers				55°53′20″N 2°09′42″W	Category B	6578	Upload Photo
Renton House Including Pavilions, Sundial, Quadrant Walls And Boundary Walls				55°52′51″N 2°17′05″W	Category A	4105	Upload another image
Houndwood, Houndwood Church (Church Of Scotland) Including Graveyard, Boundary Walls				55°52′03″N 2°15′06″W	Category B	4107	Upload Photo
Coldingham, The Bow, Burnlea, Including Boundary Walls				55°53′09″N 2°09′20″W	Category C(S)	46596	Upload Photo
Coldingham, Bridge Street, Abbey Cottage Including Boundary Walls And Gate				55°53′09″N 2°09′29″W	Category B	46597	Upload Photo
Coldingham, Fisher's Brae, Hill View Including Garden Walls And Piers				55°53′17″N 2°09′15″W	Category C(S)	46604	Upload Photo
Coldingham School Road, Sunnybank Including Ancillary Structure And Boundary Walls				55°53′14″N 2°09′36″W	Category B	46615	Upload Photo
Hillend Farm Steading Including Cobbled Yard				55°51′55″N 2°12′54″W	Category B	46630	Upload Photo
St Abbs, St Abbs Church (Church Of Scotland) Including Boundary Walls And Railings				55°53′58″N 2°08′02″W	Category C(S)	46660	Upload Photo
St Abb's Head, Lightkeeper's Cottage, Lighthouse Retreat And Keeper's Hold Including Boundary Walls And Gatepiers				55°54′57″N 2°08′22″W	Category C(S)	46662	Upload Photo
Houndwood House Including Garden Bridges To N And W				55°51′36″N 2°14′06″W	Category B	4098	Upload Photo
Alemill Farmhouse Including Boundary Walls				55°51′55″N 2°08′21″W	Category C(S)	46585	Upload Photo
Cairncross Farmhouse Including Boundary Walls, Gatepiers, Gate And Railings				55°51′55″N 2°10′28″W	Category C(S)	46595	Upload Photo
Coldingham, Bridge Street, Bridge Spanning St Andrew's Burn				55°53′09″N 2°09′27″W	Category C(S)	46598	Upload Photo
Coldingham, Christison's Brae, Gracehurst				55°53′16″N 2°09′23″W	Category C(S)	46600	Upload Photo
Coldingham, High Street, Fern Neuk Including Boundary Walls And Gate				55°53′13″N 2°09′24″W	Category C(S)	46606	Upload Photo
Coldingham, School Road, Coldingham Primary School Including Boundary Walls And Railings				55°53′18″N 2°09′43″W	Category C(S)	46612	Upload Photo
Fairlaw House Including Former Cartshed, Store, Ancillary Structure And Garden Walls				55°50′43″N 2°13′52″W	Category B	46622	Upload Photo
Hallydown House Including Walled Garden And Boundary Walls				55°52′29″N 2°07′22″W	Category B	46629	Upload Photo
Houndwood, Westwood House (Former Manse) Including Ancillary Structure, Boundary Walls And Gatepiers				55°52′05″N 2°15′15″W	Category C(S)	46637	Upload Photo
Houndwood House, South Lodge				55°51′30″N 2°14′08″W	Category C(S)	46640	Upload Photo
Reston, The Old School House Including Boundary Walls				55°51′06″N 2°12′17″W	Category C(S)	46653	Upload Photo
St Abbs, Northfield House Including Turbine House (Former), Walled Garden, Railings, Boundary Walls And Entrance Gate				55°54′01″N 2°08′06″W	Category B	46658	Upload Photo
Whitecross Farm, Cartshed And Granary				55°52′35″N 2°08′57″W	Category C(S)	46667	Upload Photo
Press Castle Including Ancillary Range, Courtyard Wall, Boundary Walls, Quadrant Walls, Piers And Gatepiers				55°52′54″N 2°12′28″W	Category B	4101	Upload Photo
St Abbs, Harbour And Old Fish Houses				55°53′55″N 2°07′48″W	Category B	4104	Upload Photo
Sunnyside Farmhouse, Near Auchencrow, Including Garden Walls				55°50′44″N 2°14′13″W	Category C(S)	4106	Upload Photo
Coldingham, Coldingham Public Hall				55°53′12″N 2°09′24″W	Category C(S)	46601	Upload Photo
Coldingham, Law House Lodge				55°53′00″N 2°09′03″W	Category C(S)	46608	Upload Photo
Coldingham, School Road, Barrie House Including Boundary Wall				55°53′13″N 2°09′28″W	Category C(S)	46610	Upload Photo
Ferneycastle Farmhouse Including Ancillary Structure, Garden Walls And Gatepiers				55°50′07″N 2°11′40″W	Category C(S)	46623	Upload Photo
Hillend Farmhouse Including Cobbled Courtyard And Garden Walls				55°51′56″N 2°12′52″W	Category C(S)	46635	Upload Photo
Houndwood, The Rest				55°51′56″N 2°14′48″W	Category C(S)	46636	Upload Photo
Howpark Farmhouse Including Garden Walls				55°53′19″N 2°16′38″W	Category C(S)	46642	Upload Photo
Press Castle, Gate Lodge				55°52′48″N 2°12′23″W	Category C(S)	46643	Upload Photo
Renton House, Walled Garden				55°52′54″N 2°16′57″W	Category C(S)	46645	Upload Photo
Reston, Main Street, Reston Auction Mart, Sheep Ring				55°51′06″N 2°11′25″W	Category B	46648	Upload another image
St Abbs, Cyrus House				55°53′55″N 2°07′46″W	Category C(S)	46656	Upload Photo
Reston, Main Street, March House Including Garden Walls				55°51′09″N 2°11′37″W	Category C(S)	191	Upload Photo
Stoneshiel Hall, Former Dovecot, Ancillary Structure And Courtyard Walls				55°50′08″N 2°12′22″W	Category C(S)	193	Upload Photo
Auchencrow, Cheviot View				55°50′21″N 2°14′18″W	Category C(S)	46586	Upload Photo
Coldingham, Fisher's Brae, Teviot House				55°53′17″N 2°09′15″W	Category C(S)	46605	Upload Photo
Coldingham, School Road, The Anchor Inn				55°53′13″N 2°09′27″W	Category C(S)	46609	Upload Photo
Grantshouse, Eye View Including Garden Wall				55°52′59″N 2°18′20″W	Category C(S)	46624	Upload Photo
Houndwood House, Bridge To Sw House				55°51′31″N 2°14′09″W	Category C(S)	46639	Upload Photo
Reston, Reston Primary School Including Boundary Walls, Railings And Gates				55°51′08″N 2°12′17″W	Category C(S)	46654	Upload Photo
St Abb's Head, Boat House At Mire Loch				55°54′37″N 2°08′24″W	Category C(S)	46661	Upload Photo
Westloch House, Former Stable Block (Incorporating Former Chapel) Including Remains Of Walled Garden				55°54′27″N 2°10′16″W	Category C(S)	46666	Upload Photo
Coldingham, The Bow, Benedict House (Former Parish Manse) Including Ancillary Structure, Garden Walls And Gatepiers				55°53′12″N 2°09′12″W	Category B	4095	Upload Photo
Stoneshiel Hall Including Ancillary Structure, Boundary Walls, Gatepiers And Gates				55°50′10″N 2°12′21″W	Category B	4100	Upload Photo
Coldingham, Bridge Street, The New Inn Including Courtyard Wall				55°53′12″N 2°09′25″W	Category C(S)	46599	Upload Photo
Coldingham, School Road, Bromley House				55°53′13″N 2°09′28″W	Category C(S)	46611	Upload Photo
Grantshouse, Ivy Bank And Ivy Bank Curios				55°52′58″N 2°18′27″W	Category C(S)	46627	Upload Photo
Reston, Main Street, Reston House Including Boundary Walls, Railings, Gatepiers And Gate				55°51′09″N 2°11′31″W	Category C(S)	46649	Upload Photo
Reston, Main Street, Reston Parish Church (Church Of Scotland) Including Boundary Walls				55°51′07″N 2°11′45″W	Category C(S)	46650	Upload Photo
St Abbs, Rock House Including Ancillary Structure And Boundary Walls				55°53′57″N 2°07′50″W	Category C(S)	46659	Upload Photo
Coldingham, School Road, Market Cross				55°53′13″N 2°09′28″W	Category A	4094	Upload another image
Coldingham, School Road, The Barn Including Boundary Walls				55°53′14″N 2°09′36″W	Category C(S)	4097	Upload Photo
Coldingham, Fisher's Brae, Burnbank Including Boundary Walls, Railings And Gates				55°53′18″N 2°09′14″W	Category C(S)	46603	Upload Photo
Coldingham, School Road, Woodbine Cottage, Ancillary Structure / Workshop				55°53′13″N 2°09′30″W	Category C(S)	46616	Upload Photo
Coldingham Loch, Boat House				55°54′37″N 2°10′03″W	Category C(S)	46620	Upload Photo
Coldlands Farmhouse				55°50′33″N 2°14′58″W	Category C(S)	46621	Upload Photo
Houndwood House, Walled Garden				55°51′40″N 2°14′04″W	Category C(S)	46641	Upload Photo
Press Castle, Walled Garden				55°52′52″N 2°12′29″W	Category C(S)	46644	Upload Photo
Reston, Mill Lade House				55°51′22″N 2°12′50″W	Category C(S)	46652	Upload Photo
St Abbs, Castle Rock				55°53′50″N 2°07′43″W	Category C(S)	46655	Upload Photo
St Abbs, Murrayfield, Cliff Cottage Including Garden Walls				55°53′53″N 2°07′51″W	Category C(S)	46657	Upload Photo
Templehall Lodge				55°53′02″N 2°10′10″W	Category C(S)	46665	Upload Photo
Coldingham, School Road, Crossgate House Including Ancillary Structures And Boundary Walls				55°53′13″N 2°09′30″W	Category C(S)	4096	Upload Photo
Coldingham, Bridge Street, Post Office And Post Office House				55°53′10″N 2°09′26″W	Category C(S)	190	Upload Photo
Coldingham, School Road, Robertson Memorial Hall Including Railings, Gatepiers And Gate				55°53′11″N 2°09′29″W	Category C(S)	46614	Upload Photo
Coldingham, War Memorial Including Boundary Walls, Gatepiers And Gate				55°53′13″N 2°09′25″W	Category C(S)	46617	Upload Photo
Grantshouse, Harelawside Farmhouse, Including Garden Walls				55°53′05″N 2°17′49″W	Category C(S)	46625	Upload Photo
Renton School (Former) Including Boundary Walls				55°52′26″N 2°17′04″W	Category C(S)	46646	Upload Photo

== Key ==
The scheme for classifying buildings in Scotland is:

- Category A: "buildings of national or international importance, either architectural or historic; or fine, little-altered examples of some particular period, style or building type."
- Category B: "buildings of regional or more than local importance; or major examples of some particular period, style or building type, which may have been altered."
- Category C: "buildings of local importance; lesser examples of any period, style, or building type, as originally constructed or moderately altered; and simple traditional buildings which group well with other listed buildings."

In March 2016 there were 47,288 listed buildings in Scotland. Of these, 8% were Category A, and 50% were Category B, with the remaining 42% being Category C.
