= Bonkyll Castle =

Castle in Scottish Borders, Scotland

- Berwickshire Scotland
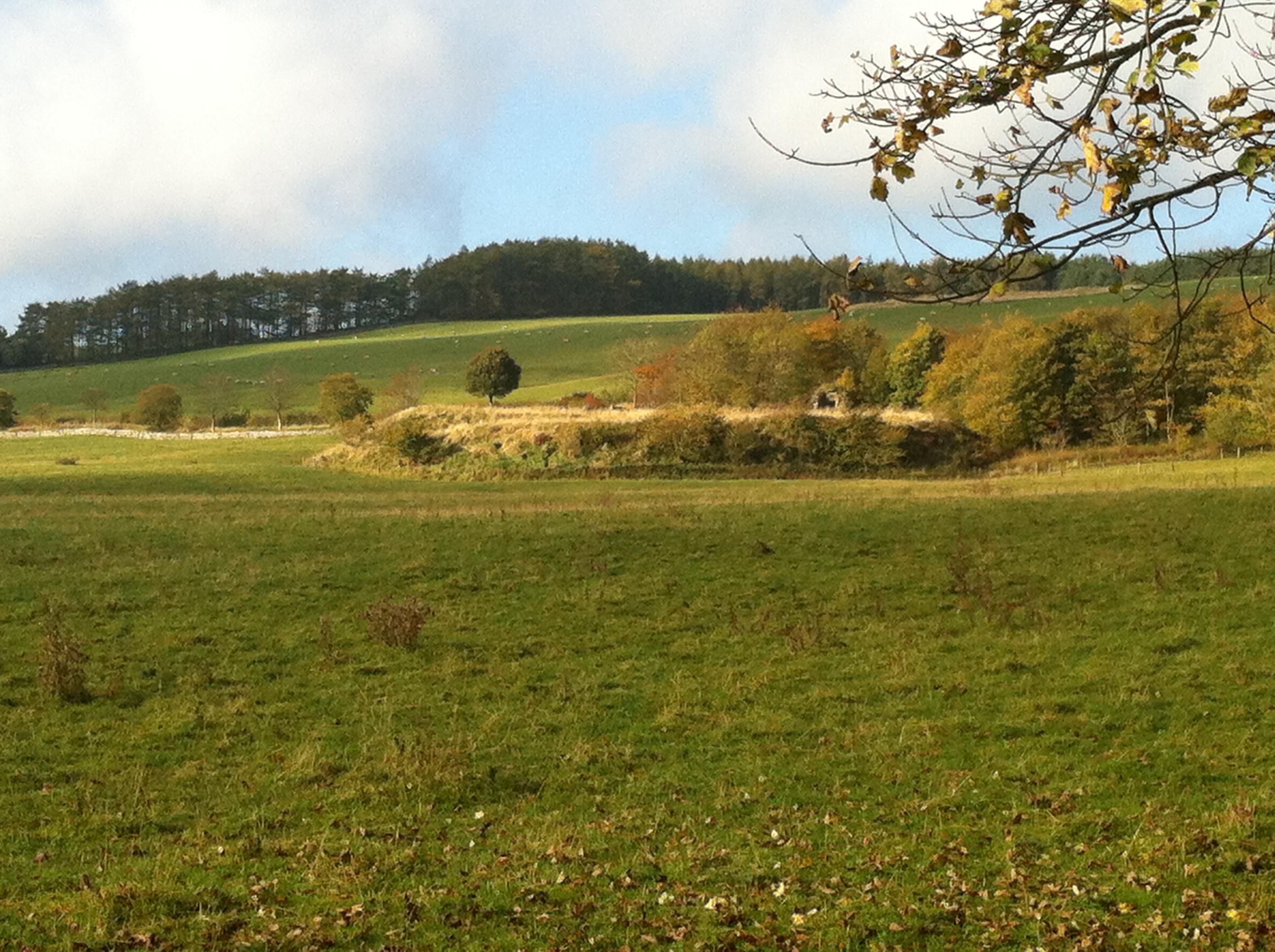
- The remains of Bonkyll Castle

Site information
- Type: Castle of Enceinte
- Owner: Private
- Open to the public: No
- Condition: ruined

Location
- Location of Bonkyll in the Scottish Borders
- Coordinates: 55.8284°N 2.31131°W
- Height: 1-3m present day

Site history
- Built: 11th century
- Built by: Bonkyl, Stewart, Douglas
- In use: 11th–16th centuries
- Materials: Stone

Bonkyll Castle (also variously spelled Bonkyl, Boncle, Buncle, Bunkle or Bonkill) was a medieval fortress situated in the historic Scottish county of Berwickshire, from 1973 the Scottish Borders. It is situated 4 miles north of Duns and 4 miles south of Grantshouse. Few traces survive and the site is protected as a scheduled monument. It was the seat of a junior branch of the Stewart family, known as "Stewart of Bonkyl", from which was descended in another junior branch "Stewart of Darnley", the paternal family of King James VI & I of Scotland and England.

== Description ==
Excepting the motte on which it stood, and a small section of curtain wall there is little left of the structure of what was once a very powerful castle of enceinte.

== Descent ==
=== de Bonkyll ===
Canting arms of de Bonkyll of Bonkyll Castle: Gules, three buckles or

The seat of the powerful barony of Bonkyll, the castle originally belonged to the de Bonkyll family, which took its name. Their canting arms were three buckles. The last in the male line was Sir Alexander de Bonkyll, whose daughter and heiress Margaret de Bonkyl married Sir John Stewart (d.1298). The castle was slighted in the course of the First War of Independence. After the death of her father in 1300, Margaret reconciled with Edward I in 1304, who restored the lands of Bonkyll to her.

=== Stewart of Bonkyll ===
- Sir Alexander Stewart of Bonkyll (d.1319), the oldest son of Sir John Stewart (d.1298) and Margaret de Bonkyll, and the first "Stewart of Bonkyll," inherited the Bonkyll estate and title after the death of his mother.
- John Stewart, 1st Earl of Angus (d.1331), son, who in 1328 married Margaret de Abernethy, the heiress of the Lordship of Abernethy. In 1329 King Robert I of Scotland created him Earl of Angus. He thus controlled broad territories in Berwickshire, Angus, and Kinross-shire.
- Thomas Stewart, 2nd Earl of Angus (b.pre-1331-1361), son, who died without male issue, leaving a daughter and heiress Margaret Stewart.
  - Margaret Stewart (d.1417), daughter and sole heiress, who inherited the Earldom of Angus and Lordship of Abernethy, and Bunkle Castle. She had an illicit affair with William Douglas, 1st Earl of Douglas, by whom she had a son George Douglas, 1st Earl of Angus.

=== Douglas, Earls of Angus ===
From the Countess Margaret's death in 1417 Bunkle passed to her son George Douglas, 1st Earl of Angus, with whose descendants it remained until the late 18th century.

George Douglas, Master of Angus, lord of the barony of Bonkill, made several charters while residing at the castle. The property passed to his widow Elizabeth Drummond as part of her jointure. Bunkle subsequently belonged to Margaret Tudor as Countess of Angus, and was held by George Douglas of Pittendreich, who had been Bailie of Bonkill since 1514. Her husband Archibald Douglas, 6th Earl of Angus was at Bonkill on 28 November 1522. In August 1523 the Earl of Surrey suggested that if Margaret Tudor came to Bunkle with her silver plate and jewels, pretending to intercede for the people of the Scottish borders, he could convey her safely to England.

The poet and laird Patrick Hume of Polwarth was bailie of Bonkyll in 1593 for James VI and he was instructed to use the rents from the houses in the mains of Bonkyll to pay the wages of the king's huntsman John Acheson.

=== Earls of Home ===
In the late 18th century ownership of Bunkle Castle passed to the Earls of Home.

== In rhyme ==
A popular Berwickshire rhyme refers to the medieval strengths of Bonkyll and the nearby fortresses of Billie Castle, and Blanerne Castle referring to their construction in the time of David I and to their sad ultimate fates as piles of rubble, an allegory to the effective extinction of the Kingdom of Scotland after the formation of Great Britain in 1707:

Bunkle, Billie and Blanerne
Three castles strong as airn
Built when Davie was a bairn
They'll all gang doon,
Wi' Scotland's Croon
And ilka ane shall be a cairn

== See also ==
- Bonkyl Kirk (church)
- Preston, Scottish Borders, local village
- Buncle, a surname
