= Kinghorn =

Kinghorn: Scottish Gaelic: Ceann Gronna
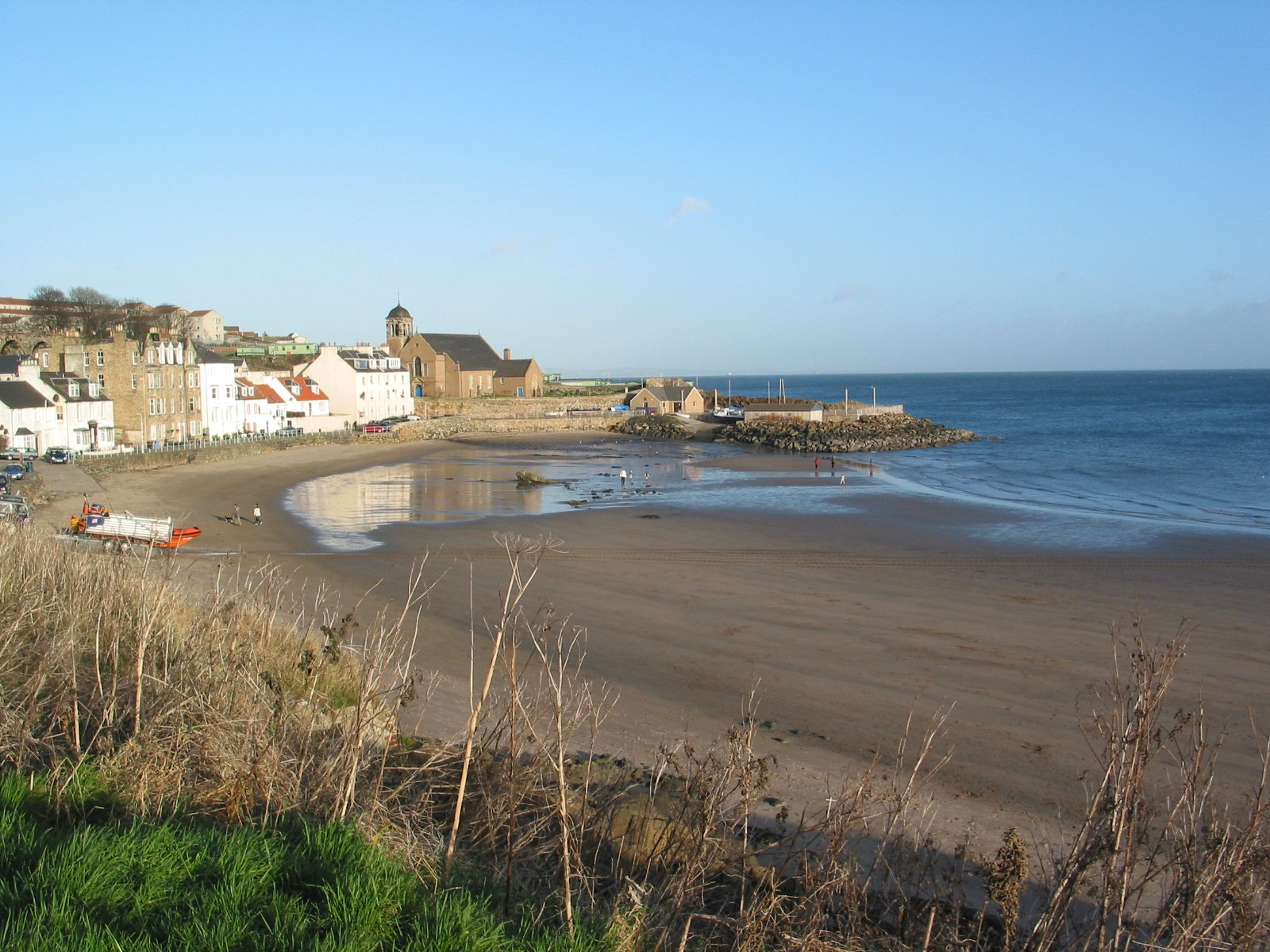
- A view across Kinghorn harbour

- Location within Fife
- Population: 2,940 (2020)
- OS grid reference: NT271869
- Council area: Fife
- Lieutenancy area: Fife
- Country: Scotland
- Sovereign state: United Kingdom
- Post town: Burntisland
- Postcode district: KY3
- Dialling code: 01592
- Police: Scotland
- Fire: Scottish
- Ambulance: Scottish
- UK Parliament: Cowdenbeath and Kirkcaldy
- Scottish Parliament: Kirkcaldy

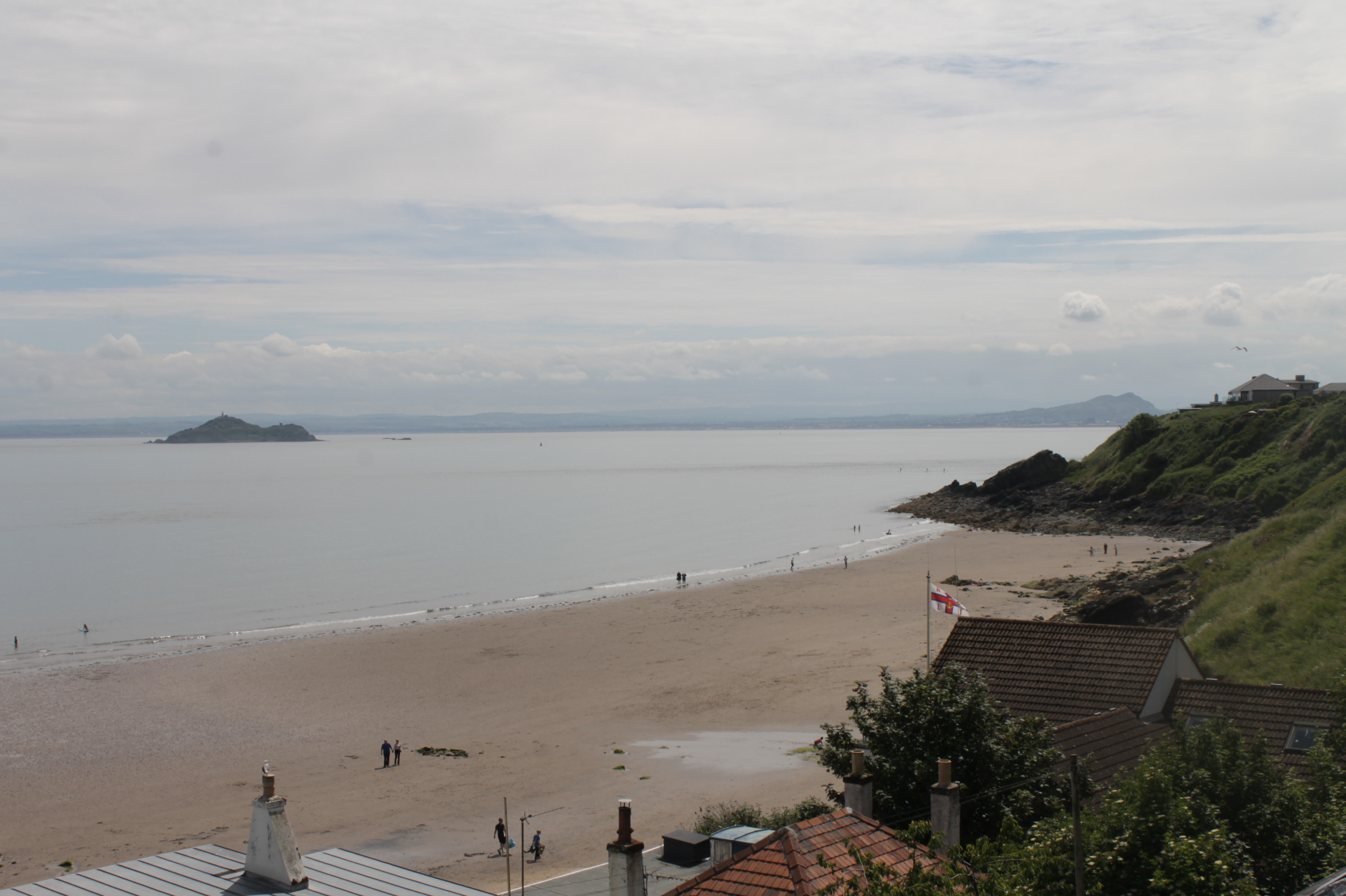
Kinghorn Bay viewing south over the Forth Estuary

Kinghorn (/ˈkɪŋhɔːrn/; Scottish Gaelic: Ceann Gronna) is a town and parish in Fife, Scotland. A seaside resort with two beaches, Kinghorn Beach and Pettycur Bay, plus a fishing port, it stands on the north shore of the Firth of Forth, opposite Edinburgh.

Known as the place where King Alexander III of Scotland died, it lies on the A921 road and the Fife Coastal Path. Kinghorn railway station is on the Edinburgh to Aberdeen and Fife Circle railway lines. Kinghorn only has a primary school, so high school pupils must travel by bus to Balwearie High School in Kirkcaldy. The neighbouring parish of Burntisland was in the past referred to as Little Kinghorn or Wester Kinghorn.

Kinghorn Lifeboat Station is one of Scotland's busiest – regularly getting called out to all sorts of emergencies in the Firth. Currently stationed at Kinghorn is an Atlantic 85 inshore lifeboat, B-836 "Tommy Niven".

The civil parish has a population of 4,201 (in 2011). According to the 2008 population estimate, the town has a population of 2,930.

== History ==
The meaning of the name Kinghorn (or Kingorn /kɪŋˈɡɔːrn/, with stress on the latter syllable, as it was pronounced locally until at least the early 20th century) comes from Scottish Gaelic ceann gronn 'head of the marsh'. Early Christian activity in the area is strongly suggested by the nearby place name Ecclesmaline, later Legsmalee. This seemingly derives from Pictish *egles + personal name [?] Màillidh, giving a meaning of ‘the church of (St) *Maillidh’. Egles- place names in former Pictland have been shown to preserve sixth to eighth century sites of Christian foundation and worship.

What comprises the modern parish of Kinghorn was originally known as Kinghorn Easter or Magna, in contrast to Kinghorn Wester or Minor, which is now Burntisland. Its first appearance in the historical record was between 1165 and 1178, when the church was granted to Holyrood Abbey by Richard, bishop of St Andrews. The settlement around this church was created a royal burgh sometime in the twelfth century, and by the fourteenth century it was the seat of one of the constabularies of the sheriffdom of Fife. David, bishop of St Andrews, dedicated the church in May 1243, perhaps to All Saints, which was recorded as the church's dedication by 1290.

The former royal castle at Kinghorn was frequently visited by the Scottish Court in the eleventh to thirteenth centuries. The King's castle, overlooking the major seaway of the Forth, stood on the headland above Pettycur. (Note: Kinghorn Castle was located at 56.0645°N 3.1751°W) King Alexander III was returning on horseback to Kinghorn Castle to see his new wife Yolande of Dreux, when he fell and was found dead on the beach of Pettycur Bay in March 1286, creating the succession crisis that led to the Wars of Scottish Independence.

A later structure, Glamis Tower (or Glamis Castle), stood just behind the High Street. (Note: Glamis Tower was located at 56.0712°N 3.1762°W) When Sir John Lyon married Princess Johanna in 1373, the daughter of King Robert II, her dowry included Glamis Castle. Rebuilt in 1543, the castle was besieged by James Kirkcaldy of Grange in 1546 and fell. Both buildings have totally disappeared and the sites built over in modern times.

During the Scottish Reformation, French troops commanded by Henri Cleutin and Captain Sarlabous sailed from Leith and fought with the Lords of the Congregation at Pettycur Bay on 7 January 1560. Kinghorn Castle remained an important possession of the Scottish Crown, and this was recognised by the creation of the Earldom of Kinghorne in 1606.

In October 1589 the minister of Kinghorn parish, John Scrimgeour, was chosen by King James VI to accompany him on his voyage to meet his bride, Anne of Denmark, in Norway.

A burn, fed from the freshwater Kinghorn Loch above the town, once provided the town with its water and subsequently provided the source of power to drive the machinery of flax mills.

The old town was dramatically transformed in 1846 by the construction of the railway viaduct across the valley of the burn and the opening of Kinghorn Station by the Edinburgh and Northern Railway which had its terminus at Burntisland for ferries across the Forth to Granton. Much of the former horse ferry traffic from Pettycur Bay was lost to Burntisland. The huge viaduct (mainly solid) splits the original town in two and totally dominates the lower (southern) section.

John Key, who had an engineering works at Kirkcaldy, opened a shipyard at Abden, on the north east side of the town, in 1864. Its final closure was in 1922. Remnants of the slipways remain. Ships built include - 1864 South Australian, Princess Helena, 1865 Niphon, Kinghorn, 1866 Dane, Great Northern, 1868 River Tay, 1869 Albatross, 1871 Alps, 1873 Clio, 1868 Travancore, 1869 Scotland, 1870 Andes, 1872 Macgregor, 1873 African, Kafir, 1874 Ithuriel, Mactan, 1876 John Stirling, 1877 Strathbeg, Griffin, John Beaumont, 1878 Lass O' Gowrie, Keilawarra, 1879 Joseph Rickett, Patrick Stewart, William Muir, 1882 Mentmore, Ranelagh, Glanworth, Glenmore, 1883 Heathmore, Gabo, Burwah, Cahors, Fitzroy, Crathie, Namoi, 1884 Eurimbla, Newcastle.

Following the opening of the Forth Railway Bridge in 1890, the North British Railway started to promote Kinghorn's picturesque sheltered bay and beach as a resort, which led to considerable development of the town.

== Buildings of note ==
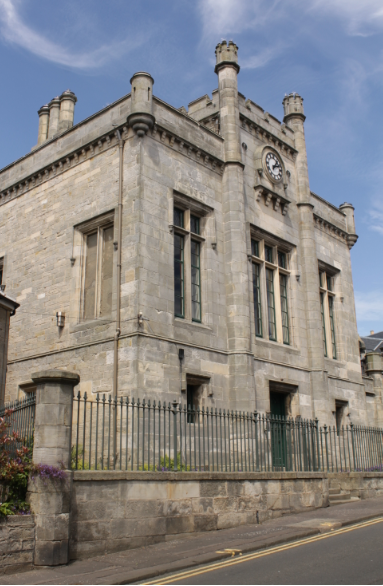
Kinghorn Town Hall

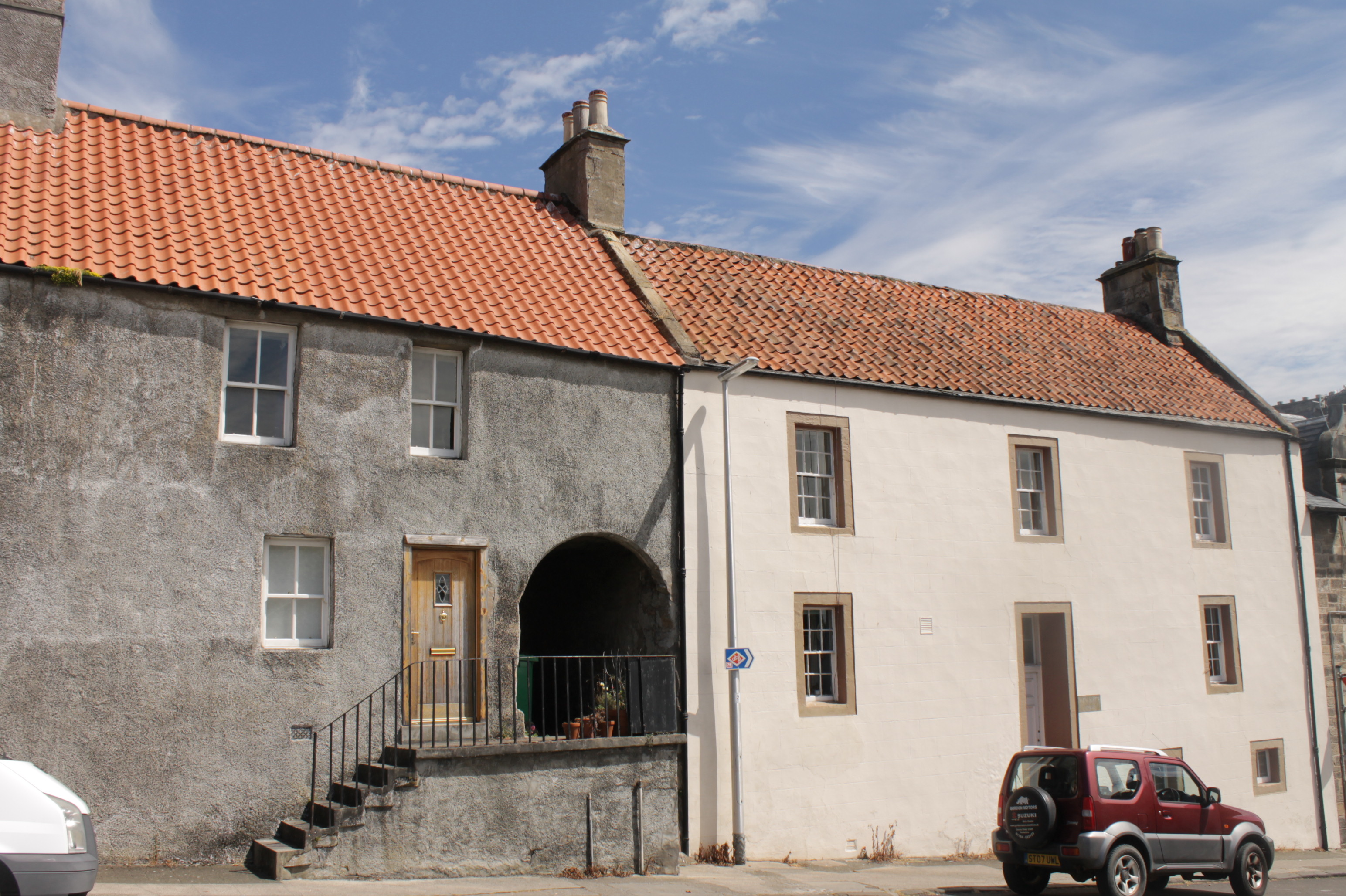
Early 18th-century houses on North Overgate, Kinghorn

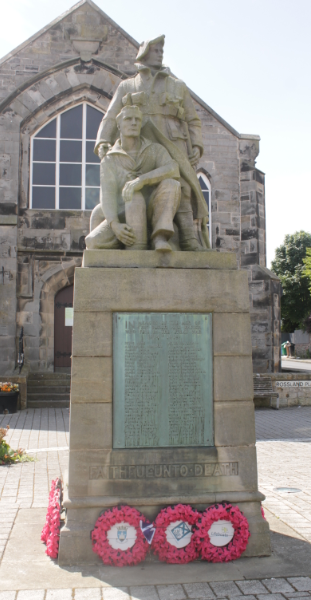
Kinghorn War Memorial

- Kinghorn Town Hall by Thomas Hamilton 1830.
- Kinghorn Parish Church (1774) with a dramatic tower added in 1895 by Sydney Mitchell
- Kinghorn War memorial (1923) designed by William Williamson of Kirkcaldy and sculpted by Alexander Carrick

The town contains a number of 18th-century houses in the Scots vernacular style, but the integrity of the streetscapes are seriously compromised by the "town planning" of the 1960s and 70s, which failed to respect the original character and form.

== Ministers ==
- William Gardine Dobie VD, served 1887–1907
- Alexander Hannay McIlwraith, served 1908–1926
- John Heriot Ballingall, served the Free Church 1845 to 1879

== Provosts ==
- John Sim served 1899 to 1908 – manager of Kinghorn Gas Works

== Notable people ==
- William Barron Coutts, military scientist
- John McAulay, recipient of the Victoria Cross
- Jimmy Frew, footballer
- George Sanders, Scottish portrait painter
- Christina Robertson, portrait painter in the UK and Russia
- John Scrimgeour, minister put under house arrest for not requiring his congregation to take the knee for Holy Communion
- Sharon Small, actress
- Professor Neil Campbell, chemist

== Education ==
Kinghorn Primary School is the only school in Kinghorn. The school is housed in a building that was built in 1986. The school has currently achieved three of the four "green flags" available under the Eco-Schools scheme, with the third flag being achieved on 27 May 2009. The school has a long history. The original Parish School building of 1823 designed by Thomas Hamilton is now a library and community centre that retains the original octagonal Museum vestibule with replicas of the Elgin Marbles.

== Culture and sport ==
An annual attraction is the Black Rock '5' Race, commonly referred to as the "Black Rock '5'" or the "Black Rock Race", a road and beach running race of about 4.5 miles (7.2 km) that has been held in Kinghorn each year since 1987.

== See also ==
- Kinghorn (Parliament of Scotland constituency)
