= Billie Castle =

Architectural structure in Scottish Borders, Scotland

Coordinates: 55.8298°N 2.24°W

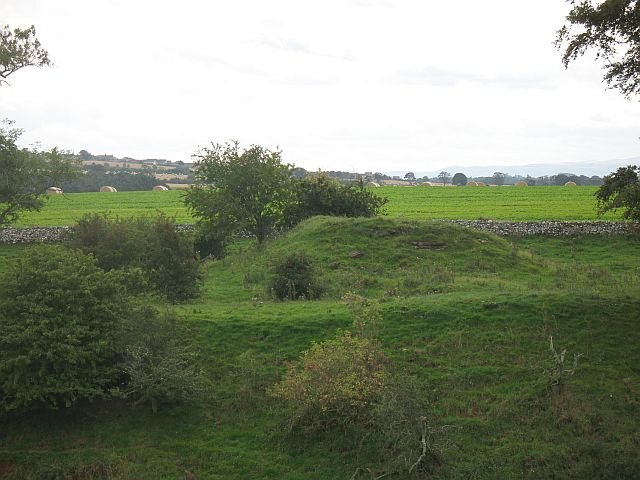
Site of Billie Castle

Billie Castle is a ruined 15th-century quadrangular castle, 3 miles (4.8 km) north west of Chirnside, Scottish Borders, Scotland, north of Billiemains. It was designated as a scheduled monument in 1988.

== History ==
The property was owned by the Dunbars. Archibald Douglas, 6th Earl of Angus sheltered here in 1528 whilst his castle of Tantallon was being unsuccessfully besieged by James V of Scotland, the Angus family having acquired it in 1435. The Renton family were granted the castle in 1540, after it had been annexed by the Crown, but it was slighted by the forces of the Earl of Hertford in May 1544 after they had burnt Edinburgh. The castle was held against the English again, and in February 1548 Hugh Willoughby was sent with Thomas Carlisle and 50 horsemen by Grey of Wilton to captured "Billie tower". 10 men dismounted and took the "barbican" from a guard of four Scots.

James VI of Scotland alarmed the English garrison at Berwick-upon-Tweed by coming to hunt near Berwick-upon-Tweed in March 1596, staying a night the house of the laird of 'Beelleys' (Billie Castle), six miles from Berwick, and then returning to Dunglass. John Carey, 3rd Baron Hunsdon noted that the laird and lady of Billie were not in residence.

More substantial remains were visible up to the 19th century.

== Structure ==
Billie Castle appears to have been a strong quadrangular keep, about 50 feet (15 m) by 40 feet (12 m), with walls over 7 feet (2.1 m) thick. An outer wall surrounded the keep. It occupied a platform about 41 by 31 metres (135 by 102 ft) that was protected by a single ditch 8 metres (26 ft) wide and 1.5 metres (4 ft 11 in) deep on three sides. On the south side, there were double ditches that may have been flooded by means of earthen dams at both ends of a natural gully just south of the enclosure. It is thought that the building had three storeys, with the upper ones being reached by a narrow stone stair in the north west angle. There were two rounded towers at the southernmost angles of the keep. Within the quadrangle are remnants of a tower and the gatehouse. Large, squared, red sandstone blocks were used in the construction. The castle is now a turf-covered mound 2.5 metres (8 ft 2 in) high that covers an area of 16 square metres (170 sq ft).

East of the castle there are the remains of a kiln, and two enclosures each of which contain traces of rectangular foundations.

== See also ==
- Castles in Great Britain and Ireland
- List of castles in Scotland
