= Constable (surname) =

Constable is a surname.

== People ==
People with this surname include:

- Andrew Constable, Lord Constable (1865–1928), Scottish politician and judge
- Albert Constable (1805–1855), American politician
- Albert Constable (1838–1904), American politician from Maryland
- Archibald Constable (1774–1827), Scottish publisher and bookseller, whose business continues as Constable & Robinson
- Bernie Constable (1921–1997), English cricketer
- Cuthbert Constable (died 1746), English physician and antiquary
- David Constable (1939-2023), British candlemaker
- Dean Constable (born 1980), Canadian politician
- Dennis Constable (1925–2011), English cricketer
- Elinor G. Constable (1934–2022), American diplomat
- Emma Constable (born 1975), English badminton player
- Frank Challice Constable (1846–1937), English barrister and writer
- Francis Constable (1592–1647), English bookseller and publisher
- Henry Constable (1562–1613), English poet
- Ian Constable, Australian ophthalmologist
- James Constable (born 1984), English footballer
- Jamie Constable (born 1964), British private equity financier
- Jim Constable (1933–2002), American baseball player
- Jimmy Constable (born 1971), British pop singer
- John Constable (1776–1837), English painter
- Kate Constable (born 1966), Australian author
- Lionel Constable (1828–1887), British artist
- Liz Constable (born 1943), Australian politician
- Marmaduke Constable (c. 1455–1518), English soldier
- Paule Constable, British lighting designer
- Robert Constable (c. 1478–1537), English nobleman and soldier
- Robert L. Constable (born 1942), American computer scientist
- Thomas Constable (printer and publisher) (1812–81), Scottish printer and publisher
- Sir William Constable, 1st Baronet (bap. 1590–1655), English soldier and politician
- William George Constable (1887–1976), English-American art historian

== Characteres ==
- RCMP constable John Constable, a fictional character from The Beachcombers

== Lists of personnages ==
- Charles Constable (disambiguation)
- John Constable (disambiguation)
- Marmaduke Constable (disambiguation)
- Robert Constable (disambiguation)
- William Constable (disambiguation)

== See also ==
- Constable (disambiguation)
