= Marmaduke Constable (died 1545) =

English politician

Sir Marmaduke Constable
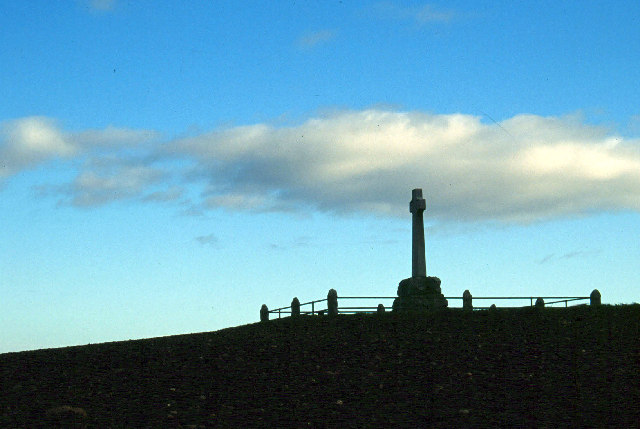
- Memorial at Flodden Field, where Marmaduke Constable was knighted

Member of Parliament for Yorkshire
- In office 1529–1545

Personal details
- Born: c.1480
- Died: 14 September 1545 (aged 64–65)
- Resting place: Everingham, Yorkshire
- Spouse: Barbara Sothill
- Children: Sir Robert Constable; William Constable; Everild Constable
- Parent(s): Sir Marmaduke Constable, Joyce Stafford

Sir Marmaduke Constable (c. 1480 – 14 September 1545), of Everingham, Yorkshire, was an English soldier and Member of Parliament. He was the great-grandfather of the poet, Henry Constable, author of Diana, one of the first sonnet sequences in English.

== Family ==
The family takes its name from the office of constable of Chester, to which Hugh d'Avranches, 1st Earl of Chester, appointed his kinsman, Nigel, Baron of Halton, at the time of William the Conqueror. The founder of the house of Constable in Flamborough was Robert Lacy (d. 1216), surnamed 'Le Constable', ancestor of Marmaduke Constable.

Marmaduke Constable, born about 1480, was the second son of Sir Marmaduke Constable (c. 1456/7 – 1518), eldest son and heir of Sir Robert Constable (4 April 1423 – 23 May 1488) of Flamborough, Yorkshire, and Agnes Wentworth (d. 20 April 1496), daughter of Sir Roger Wentworth of North Elmsall, Yorkshire, by Margery le Despencer. Constable's mother was Joyce Stafford, daughter of Sir Humphrey Stafford (1400 – 7 June 1450) of Grafton, Worcestershire, slain at Sevenoaks by the rebel, Jack Cade, and Eleanor Aylesbury (born c. 1406), the daughter of Sir Thomas Aylesbury (d. 9 September 1418) and his second wife, Katherine Pabenham (c. 1372 – 17 June 1436). Constable had three brothers and two sisters:

- Sir Robert Constable (c. 1478 – 1537), knighted at Blackheath on 17 June 1497, and executed for treason for taking part in the Pilgrimage of Grace. He married Jane Ingleby, the daughter of Sir William Ingleby of Ripley, Yorkshire, by whom he had three sons and four or five daughters.
- Sir William Constable of Hatfield in Holderness, knighted at Flodden.
- Sir John Constable (c. 1491 – 1554/6) of Kinoulton, Nottinghamshire, who married, by February 1521, Jane Sothill, one of the twin daughters and co-heirs of Henry Sothill, esquire, of Stoke Faston, Leicestershire, and Joan Empson, daughter of Sir Richard Empson, by whom he had three daughters. He was knighted by the Earl of Hertford on 11 May 1544.
- Agnes Constable, who married firstly Sir Henry Ughtred, and secondly, Sir William Percy.
- Eleanor Constable (d. 1525), who married firstly John Ingleby of Ripley, Yorkshire. She married secondly, Sir Thomas Berkeley, 5th Baron Berkeley (1472 – 22 January 1533), by whom she had two sons, Sir Thomas Berkeley, and Maurice Berkeley, esquire, and two daughters, Muriel, who married Sir Robert Throckmorton of Coughton Court, and Joan, who married Sir Nicholas Poyntz of Iron Acton, Gloucestershire.

== Career ==
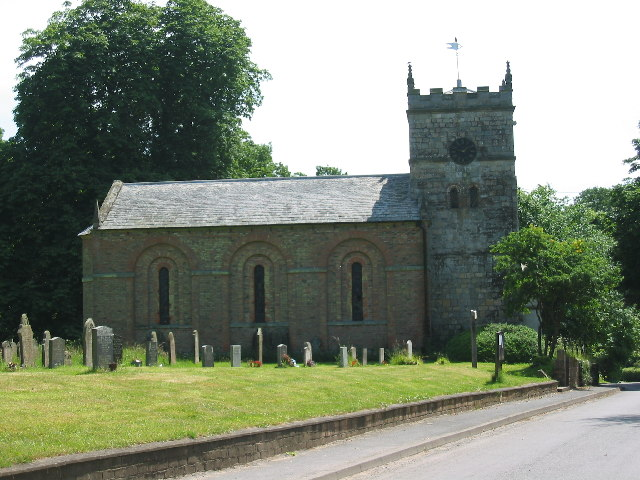
Church of St Everild, Everingham, where Sir Marmaduke Constable and his wife were buried

Constable was Sheriff of Yorkshire in 1509–10, and Sheriff of Lincolnshire in 1513–14. He fought at Flodden, where his father commanded the left wing, and was knighted 9 September 1513 after the battle by Thomas Howard, then Earl of Surrey. He was in attendance at the Field of the Cloth of Gold and at King Henry VIII's meeting at Gravelines with the Emperor Charles V in 1520.

Constable served in the wars in Scotland in 1522 and 1523, and played a prominent part in the capture of both Jedburgh and Ferniehurst in September 1523, where his courage earned praise from Howard, by then Duke of Norfolk. He was a member of the Council of the North from 1537 until his death.

In 1529 he was elected to Parliament as a Knight of the Shire (MP) for Yorkshire, together with his first cousin, Sir John Neville. According to Bindoff, Constable was one of a number of Members, mainly politically conservative, who dined at the Queens Head to discuss parliamentary matters.

In 1536 he remained loyal to the Crown when his elder brother, Sir Robert, became one of the leaders of the rebellion known as the Pilgrimage of Grace. Perhaps as a reward for his loyalty, Constable was permitted to purchase Drax Priory, which had been founded by his wife's ancestors.

Constable's wife, Barbara, died 4 October 1540, and was buried in the Church of St. Everild, Everingham. On 2 March 1541 Constable made his will, in which he requested to be buried beside his wife. He lived for another four years, and saw military service again in Scotland in the campaign of 1544. He died 14 September 1545, and was buried in the Church of St. Everild.

== Marriage and issue ==
Constable married Barbara Sothill (c. 1474 – 4 October 1540), the daughter and heir of John Sothill, esquire, of Everingham, Yorkshire, by his first wife, Agnes Ingleby, the daughter of Sir William Ingleby. In 1502 Barbara was coheiress to her brother George Sothill, who had been adjudged an imbecile. By Barbara Sothill, Constable had two sons and a daughter:

- Sir Robert Constable (before 1495 – 12 October 1558), who married, before 1530, Katherine Manners, the daughter of George Manners, 11th Baron de Ros of Helmsley, by Anne, only daughter and heiress of Sir Thomas St. Leger and Anne of York, by whom he had six sons, including his heir, Sir Marmaduke Constable (d. 1 February 1575), and a second son, Sir Robert Constable (d. 1591), and five daughters. The second son, Sir Robert Constable (d. 1591), married Christiana Dabridgecourt, widow of Anthony Forster, and daughter of John Dabridgecourt of Langdon Hall, Warwickshire. Their only child was the poet, Henry Constable, author of Diana, a sequence of 23 sonnets published in 1592 in London by Richard Smith, one of the first English sonnet sequences.
- William Constable, a cleric.
- Everild Constable.
