= Robert Constable (disambiguation) =

Sir Robert Constable (c. 1478–1537) was an English soldier and a leader of the Pilgrimage of Grace.

Robert Constable may also refer to:

- Sir Robert Constable, English member of Parliament for Yorkshire in 1388
- Sir Robert Constable (soldier, died 1558), English soldier and member of Parliament for Yorkshire, nephew of Sir Robert Constable (died 1537)
- Sir Robert Constable (soldier, died 1591), English soldier and member of Parliament for Nottinghamshire and Nottingham, son of the above
- Robert Constable, English member of Parliament for Appleby in 1586
- Bob Constable (born 1932), Australian footballer for Melbourne
- Robert L. Constable (born 1942), American computer scientist
