= Marmaduke Constable (disambiguation) =

Marmaduke Constable (c. 1456/7–1518) was an English soldier.

Marmaduke Constable may also refer to:

- Sir Marmaduke Constable I, High Sheriff of Yorkshire in the 1360s
- Marmaduke Constable (died 1545), MP
- Marmaduke Constable (died 1574), MP for Warwickshire (UK Parliament constituency)
- Marmaduke Constable, 2nd Baronet (1619–c. 1680) of the Constable baronets
- Marmaduke Constable, 4th Baronet (1682–1746) of the Constable baronets
