= Old Abbey =

Old Abbey is the name of:

- Bayham Old Abbey, a ruined abbey in Kent, England
- Old Abbey, Malton, house in North Yorkshire, England
- Old Abbey, Yedingham, a farmhouse in North Yorkshire, England
