= Ebberston Hall =

Country house in Ebberston, North Yorkshire, England

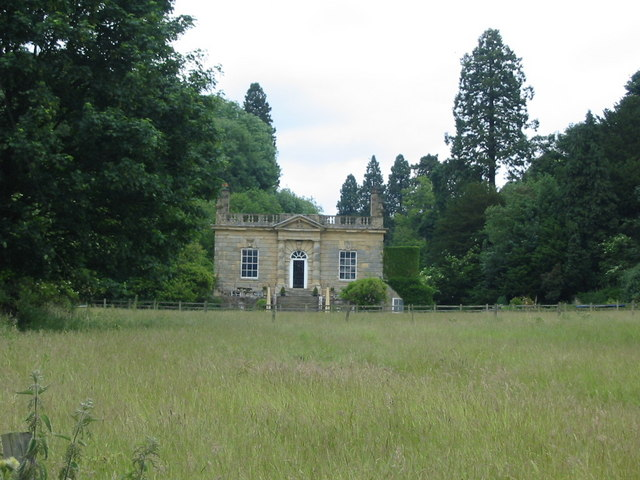
- Ebberston Hall in 2010

General information
- Architectural style: Neo-Palladian
- Location: Ebberston, North Yorkshire
- Coordinates: 54°14′20″N 0°37′56″W
- Client: William Thompson

Height
- Roof: Slate

Technical details
- Structural system: Sandstone ashlar

Design and construction
- Architect: Colen Campbell

Listed Building – Grade I
- Official name: Ebberston Hall
- Designated: 10 November 1953
- Reference no.: 1149495

Ebberston Hall is an 18th-century country house and former hunting lodge in the parish of Ebberston, North Yorkshire, England. Designed by the Scottish architect Colen Campbell in 1718 for William Thompson, Member of Parliament for Scarborough, it is widely regarded as one of the earliest and smallest examples of Palladian architecture in England.

The hall was designated a Grade I listed building on 10 November 1953.

== History ==
=== 18th century: Design and construction ===
William Thompson commissioned Colen Campbell to construct a compact, villa-style retreat in the valley of Ebberston Beck in 1718. Campbell designed the lodge to sit within elaborate formal water gardens, which originally featured cascades, canals, and a decorative water pavilion behind the main house fed by local springs.

=== 19th century to present ===
Following Thompson's death, the estate passed through marriage to the Hotham family of Dalton Hall. During the 19th century, the formal waterworks were largely drained or altered, and the single-storey side wings designed by Campbell were demolished, leaving the main central block standing isolated.

In the mid-20th century, the house underwent restoration to stabilize its stonework and internal decorations. Ebberston Hall remains a private residence.

=== Notable residents and sport ===
During the early 19th century, Ebberston Hall was leased by the noted sportsman and MP George Osbaldeston ("Squire Osbaldeston"), who used the estate as a foxhunting lodge. Osbaldeston made extensive use of the surrounding moorland for shooting and stocked the hall's formal water channels with trout.

In the mid-20th century, following a period of neglect, the house was acquired by the de Wend-Fenton family, who undertook a major structural restoration of the ashlar masonry and interior panelling.

== Architecture ==
=== Depiction in Vitruvius Britannicus ===
Ebberston Hall holds a significant place in British architectural history as an early prototype of the Palladian revival in Great Britain. Campbell featured the house in Volume III (Plate 47) of his seminal architectural treatise Vitruvius Britannicus (1725), titling the plate "The Plan and Elevation of Ebberston Lodge in Yorkshire, the Seat of William Thompson Esq."

The engravings record Campbell's original architectural vision on a square plan measuring 46 by 46 feet (14 by 14 m), designed strictly as a rustic villa or casino: The main floor (piano nobile) was arranged symmetrically around a central square hall, flanked by bedchambers and reception rooms. Plate 47 shows sweeping single-storey loggias connecting the main house to small side pavilions, though these were removed in the 19th century. Campbell adapted the ideas of Andrea Palladio and Inigo Jones, utilizing a heavily rusticated basement to support the smoother ashlar masonry above. Rather than a projecting portico, he set the central entrance loggia behind a pair of Tuscan columns in antis.

=== Exterior ===
The surviving central block is constructed from finely dressed sandstone ashlar under a slate roof. The south front is three bays wide and set over a rusticated basement storey.

Access to the principal floor is via a double flight of stone steps leading to the pedimented Tuscan entrance. The piano nobile features tall sash windows with moulded architraves, positioned below a bracketed cornice and a balustraded parapet.

=== Interior ===
Despite its small footprint, the interior preserves notable early 18th-century classical decoration. The principal room on the piano nobile features ornate pine panelling, carved door surrounds, and a marble fireplace in the manner of William Kent. The plaster ceilings retain moulded decorative motifs featuring classical foliage and rosettes.

== See also ==
- Grade I listed buildings in North Yorkshire (district)
- Listed buildings in Ebberston and Yedingham
