= John Constable (disambiguation) =

John Constable was an English painter.

John Constable may also refer to:

== Politicians ==
- John Constable (Lord Mayor of York) on List of Lord Mayors of York
- John Constable (MP died 1550s) for Nottinghamshire
- John Constable (of Burton Constable), MP for Hedon

== Religious figures ==
- John Constable (Jesuit)
- John Constable (priest), Dean of Lincoln

== Others ==
- John Constable (epigrammatist) (fl. 1520), English epigrammatist
- John Constable (writer) (born 1952), playwright, poet, performer and activist
- John Constable, 2nd Viscount of Dunbar, Viscount of Dunbar
- John Constable (captain), see Action of August 1702

== Fictional characters ==
- RCMP constable John Constable, a fictional character from The Beachcombers

== See also ==
- Constable (disambiguation)
- John (disambiguation)
