= Old Abbey, Yedingham =

Building in Yedingham, North Yorkshire, England

Coordinates: 54°12′22″N 0°37′41″W

The Old Abbey is a historic building in Yedingham, a village in North Yorkshire, in England.

Yedingham Priory was a Benedictine nunnery, which was founded in the 12th century. The nunnery was dissolved during the Dissolution of the Monasteries. In the late 17th century, a farmhouse was constructed on part of the site. This was substantially altered in the 18th century. At this time, a wing including a cart shed and barn was added. This section incorporates a surviving wall from the abbey, believed to be the south wall of its church. There were further alterations in the 19th century, and many of the windows and doors were replaced in the 20th century. It was grade II* listed in 1953, and also forms part of a scheduled monument. In 2016, it was added to Historic England's Buildings at Risk Register, but was later restored.

The building is constructed of sandstone, with pantile roofs, and has coped gables and shaped kneelers. It has two storeys and an L-shaped plan, with a cross-wing. At the rear of the outbuilding is a blocked round arch of voussoirs with a moulded impost band, and a bracketed holy water stoup with a trefoiled canopy. Inside, a second, pointed, arch is visible, and there are also two 18th-century plank doors.

== See also ==
- Listed buildings in Ebberston and Yedingham
- Grade II* listed buildings in North Yorkshire (district)
