= St John's Church, Yedingham =

Parish church in England

Coordinates: 54°12′15″N 0°37′55″W

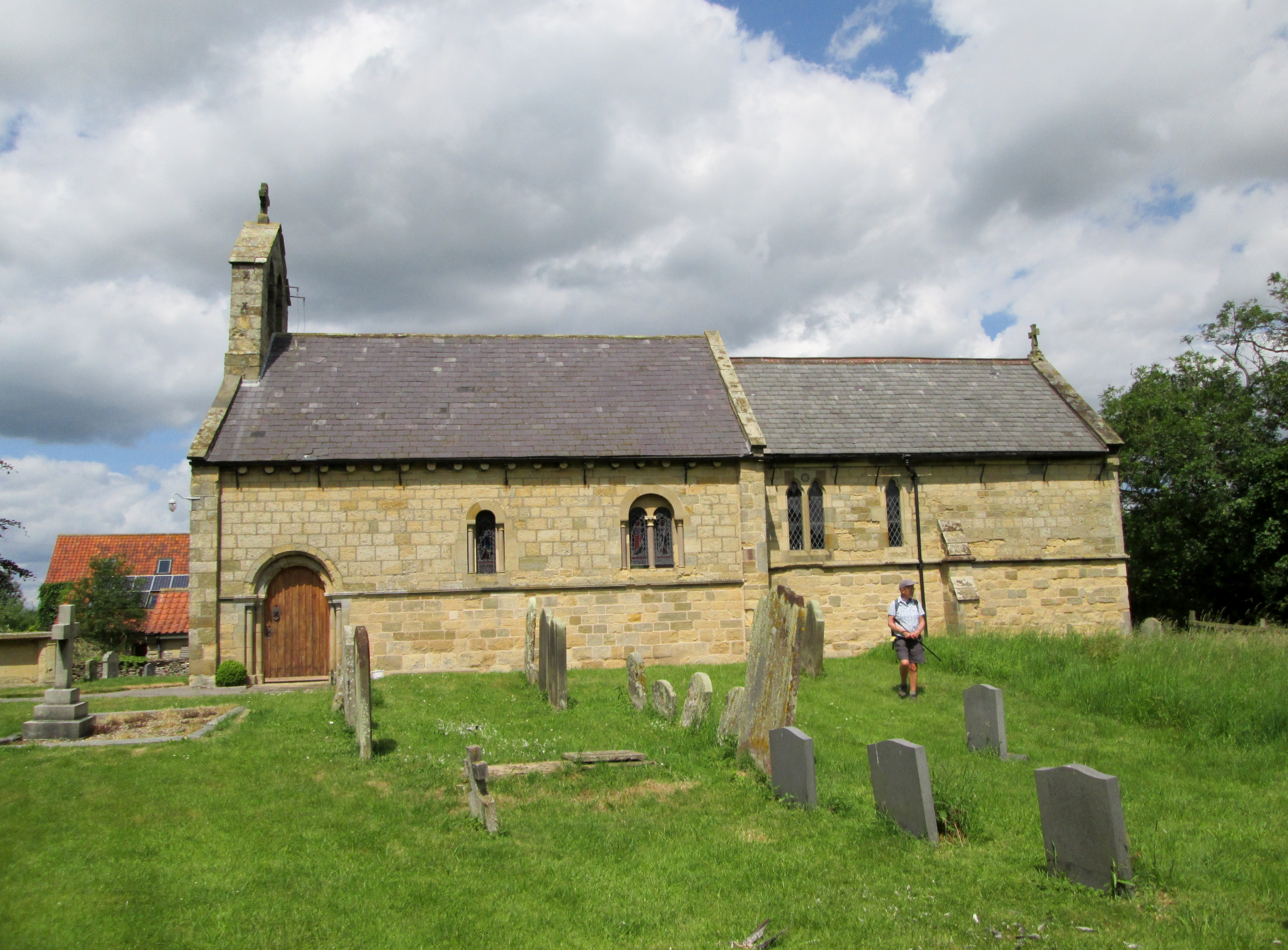
The church, in 2015

St John's Church is the parish church of Yedingham, a village in North Yorkshire, in England.

A church was built in Yedingham in the 12th century. It was entirely rebuilt between 1862 and 1863, the chancel to a design by William Butterfield, and the nave to a design by William Tuke. The only survivals from the old church are some elements of the south doorway, and the font. The church was grade II listed in 1966.

The church is built of sandstone with a stone slate roof, and consists of a three-bay nave and a chancel. At the west end is a wide pilaster buttress with round-arched openings carrying a gabled double bellcote. The south doorway has a round arch and two orders, on paired columns with leaf capitals, the outer order is chamfered, and the inner order incorporates 12th-century moulding. On the sides are sill bands and round-arched windows. The font has a tub design, with an octagonal base.

== See also ==
- Listed buildings in Ebberston and Yedingham
