= William Constable =

William Constable may refer to:

- Sir William Constable, 1st Baronet (1590–1655), English regicide
- William Constable (cricketer) (1851–1894), cricketer
- William Constable (designer) (1906–1989), Australian film and stage designer

== See also ==
- Constable (surname)
