= Queens Head =

Queens Head or Queen's Head may refer to

== Inns and public houses in the United Kingdom ==
- Queen's Head, Bramfield, Suffolk, England
- Queen's Head, Brook Green, Hammersmith, London, England
- Queen's Head, Newton, Cambridgeshire, England
- Queen's Head, Pinner, Harrow, London
- Queen's Head, Stepney, Tower Hamlets, London
- Queen's Head, Stockport, Greater Manchester, England
- Queen's Head, Stockwell, Brixton, London
- Queen's Head, Tolleshunt D'Arcy, Essex, England
- Queen's Head, Uxbridge, London
- Queen's Head Tavern, Fleet Street, London
- Queens Head, Monmouth, Wales
- Old Queen's Head, Sheffield, South Yorkshire, England
- The Old Queens Head, Islington, London
- The Queen's Head, Sandridge, Hertfordshire, England
