= Grapes Inn, Ebberston =

Listed pub in North Yorkshire, England

Grapes Inn
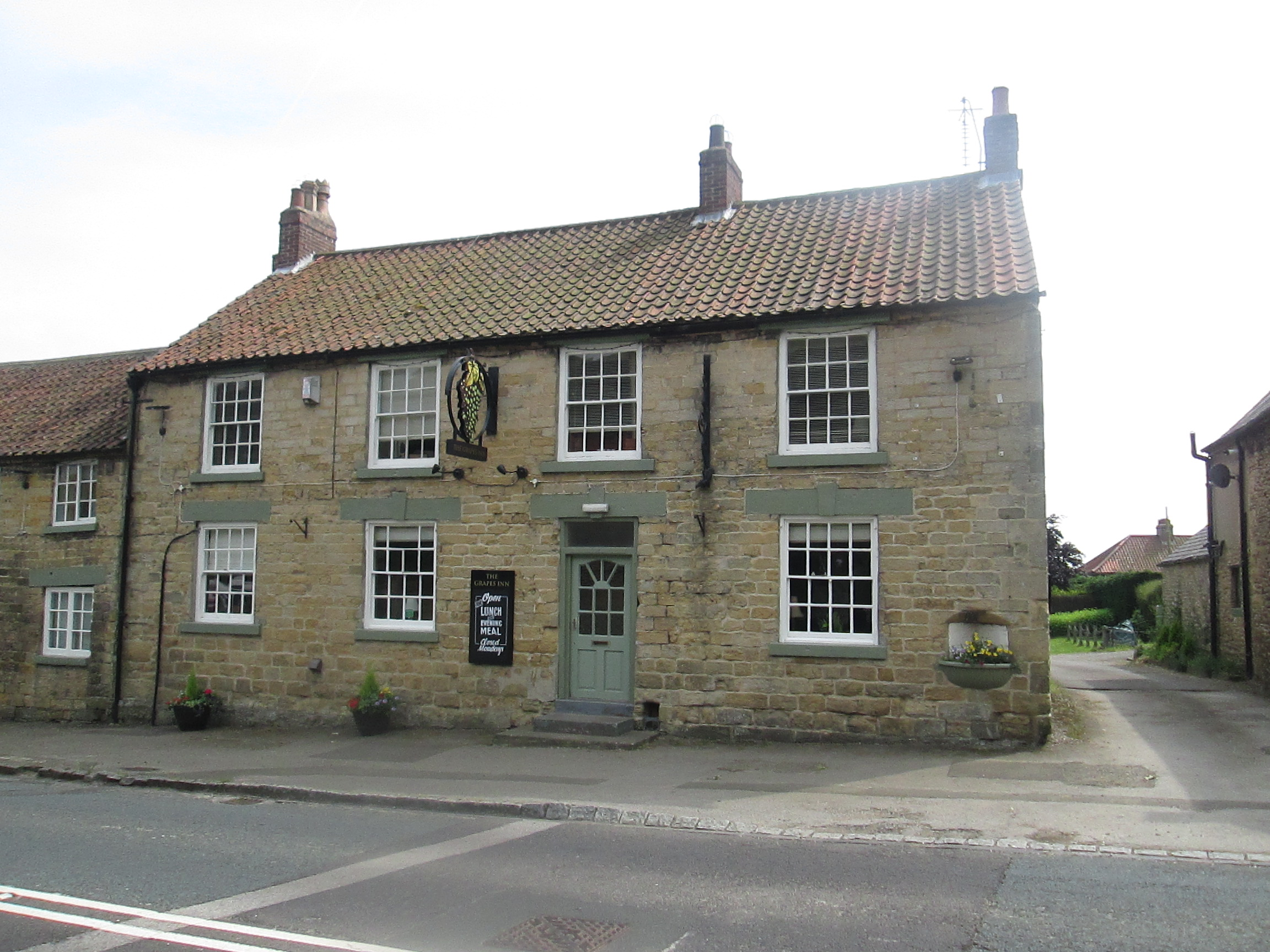
- The pub in 2017
- Interactive map of the Grapes Inn area

General information
- Type: Public house
- Location: Ebberston, North Yorkshire, England
- Coordinates: 54.25759°N 1.89787°W
- Year built: Late 18th century
- Renovated: 2009 (refurbished)

Design and construction
- Designations

Listed Building – Grade II
- Official name: The Grapes Inn
- Designated: 5 February 1986
- Reference no.: 1280331

Website
- thegrapesebberston.co.uk

The Grapes Inn is a historic public house in Ebberston, a village in North Yorkshire, England.

The building largely dates from the late 18th century, although it has earlier origins. In 1776, it was purchased by the Thorpe family, who ran it until 2007. It was altered in various ways over the centuries, and was Grade II listed in 1986. In 2009, it was refurbished at a cost of £100,000. At the time, it was owned by Admiral Taverns.

The pub is built of sandstone with a pantile roof. It has two storeys, four bays, and a rear wing on the right. The doorway is approached by steps and has a fanlight, the windows are sashes, and the ground floor openings have lintels with raised keystones.

== See also ==
- Listed buildings in Ebberston and Yedingham
