= Listed buildings in Ebberston and Yedingham =

Ebberston and Yedingham is a civil parish in the county of North Yorkshire, England. It contains 32 listed buildings that are recorded in the National Heritage List for England. Of these, one is listed at Grade I, the highest of the three grades, six are at Grade II*, the middle grade, and the others are at Grade II, the lowest grade. The parish contains the villages of Ebberston and Yedingham, and the surrounding countryside. Most of the listed buildings are houses, cottages and associated structures, farmhouses and farm buildings. The others include churches, a churchyard cross, a former malthouse, a public house, and a former chapel.

== Key ==
| Grade | Criteria |
|---|---|
| I | Buildings of exceptional interest, sometimes considered to be internationally important |
| II* | Particularly important buildings of more than special interest |
| II | Buildings of national importance and special interest |

== Buildings ==
| Name and location | Photograph | Date | Notes | Grade |
|---|---|---|---|---|
| St Mary's Church, Ebberston; 54.23783°N 0.63315°W | | 12th century | The church has been altered and extended through the centuries, and it was restored and much rebuilt in 1876 by Ewan Christian. It is built in sandstone with a slate roof, and consists of a nave, a north aisle, a south porch, a chancel and a west tower. The tower has two stages, two-light louvred bell openings with trefoil heads and hood moulds, and an embattled parapet. The porch is gabled and the doorway has a round arch, recessed in two orders, with roll-moulding and a scalloped capital. | II* |
| The Old Abbey and farmbuilding 54.20607°N 0.62782°W | — | 12th to 13th century | The farmhouse and outbuilding incorporate part of the former chapel of Yedingham Priory. They are in sandstone, with pantile roofs, and have coped gables and shaped kneelers. There are two storeys and an L-shaped plan, with a cross-wing. At the rear of the outbuilding is a blocked round arch of voussoirs with a moulded impost band, and a bracketed holy water stoup with a trefoiled canopy. | II* |
| Churchyard cross 54.23766°N 0.63307°W | | 15th century | The cross in the churchyard of St Mary's Church is in sandstone, and consists of a tapering octagonal shaft. It stands on a cylindrical pedestal and a square base. | II |
| Church House; 54.23370°N 0.62294°W | — | Early 17th century or earlier | The house, which has been extended, is in sandstone on a plinth, with quoins, and a pantile roof with a coped gable and kneeler on the left. There are two storeys and three bays. The doorway has quoined jambs, a chamfered surround, and a chamfered four-centred arched head. The windows are sashes with heavy tooled lintels. On the right return is a massive four-stage chimney stack, and inside the house is an inglenook fireplace. | II |
| Ebberston Hall; 54.23875°N 0.63227°W | | 1718 | Built as a summer villa and designed by Colen Campbell, it is in sandstone and has since been altered. The main front has one storey and a basement, and three bays. The basement extends to form a terrace that is approached by an open staircase, flanked at the bottom by obelisk torch standards. The front has vermiculated rustication. A further flight of steps leads to a central door with pilaster jambs, a radial fanlight, and a rusticated surround with chamfered voussoirs, and a keystone with a mask and a monogram. The doorcase has attached Tuscan columns, and a pediment with a bust of a faun in the tympanum. The outer bays contain sash windows with chamfered voussoirs, and keystones with masks and foliage. At the top is a projecting cornice with a balustrade and corner vases. AT the rear are five bays, the middle three bays containing a Tuscan loggia. | I |
| Wall of cascade 50 metres north of Ebberston Hall; 54.23934°N 0.63215°W | — | c. 1718 | The lowest cascade of the water garden is in limestone, and consists of a stepped wall about 1.25 metres (4 ft 1 in) high and 10 metres (33 ft) long, forming a dam to the canal behind it. The central part is channelled and there is a decoraive urn on each side. | II* |
| Wall of cascade 100 metres north of Ebberston Hall; 54.23973°N 0.63201°W | — | c. 1718 | The middle cascade of the water garden is in limestone, and consists of a stepped wall about 1.25 metres (4 ft 1 in) high and 10 metres (33 ft) long, forming a dam to the canal behind it. The ends are channelled. | II* |
| Westward Barn and The Cow House; 54.23018°N 0.62299°W | — | Mid 18th century | The byre and the barn with a loft are in sandstone with pantile roofs. The byre is the older, with the barn dating from the 19th century. The byre contains doorways and timber-framed windows. The barn has quoins, and contains board doors and pitching windows. | II |
| 2 and 4 Chapel Terrace, Ebberston; 54.23174°N 0.62374°W | — | Mid 18th century | A pair of cottages in sandstone, with a pantile roof and a coped gable and a shaped kneeler on the left. There are two storeys and six bays. On the front is a doorway and casement windows, one in a blocked doorway. | II |
| Bridge Farmhouse; 54.20433°N 0.63264°W | | Mid 18th century | The farmhouse is in sandstone, with the right return rendered, on a chamfered plinth, with quoins, and an M-shaped pantile roof with part of the former chapel of Yedingham Priory three bays, and an added parallel rear range. In the centre is a doorway with a divided fanlight, and a shaped lintel with a keystone, and the windows are sashes with keystones. | II |
| Cliff House; 54.23543°N 0.62188°W | — | Mid 18th century | The house is in sandstone, and has a pantile roof with coped gables and shaped kneelers. There are two storeys, and an L-shaped plan with a front of four bays. On the front is a fretwork porch, and a doorway with a fluted surround and a blocked fanlight. In the left bay is a two-storey canted bay window, and the other windows are sashes. | II |
| Westwood Farmhouse; 54.22998°N 0.62288°W | | Mid 18th century | The farmhouse is in limestone, with a floor band, a moulded eaves cornice, and a pantile roof with coped gables and shaped kneelers. There are two storeys, three bays and a rear wing. The central doorway has a divided fanlight, the windows are sashes, and all the openings have lintels with tripartite keystones. Inside, there is high quality wall panelling. | II* |
| 13 and 15 Main Street, Ebberston; 54.23446°N 0.62230°W | — | Mid to late 18th century | An inn, later a pair of cottages, in sandstone, with quoins, and a pantile roof with coped gables and shaped kneelers. There are two storeys and three bays. On the front are two doorways, and the windows are sashes, some horizontally-sliding. Above the ground floor windows and the original doorway are lintels with tripartite keystones. | II |
| 46 Main Street, Ebberston; 54.23239°N 0.62312°W | — | Mid to late 18th century | A pair of cottages, later combined, in sandstone, with quoins, and a pantile roof with a coped gable and a shaped kneeler on the right. There is a single storey and attics, and four bays. On the left is a canted bay window, and to its right is a doorway with a heavy lintel. Further to the right is a doorway flanked by horizontally-sliding sash windows, all with a lintel and a tripartite keystone. The upper floor contains similar sash windows. | II |
| Crossgate House; 54.23562°N 0.62517°W | — | Mid to late 18th century | The house is in sandstone, with quoins, and a slate roof with coped gables and kneelers. There are two storeys and two bays. The doorway is in the centre, the windows are horizontally-sliding sashes, and all the ground floor openings have lintels with tripartite keystones. | II |
| Welldale Farmhouse; 54.23143°N 0.60018°W | — | c. 1770 | The farmhouse is in sandstone, and has a pantile roof with coped gables and plain kneelers. There are two storeys and three bays, with flanking single-storey wings. The central doorway is approached by steps and has a pattered fanlight, the windows are sashes, and all the openings have lintels with tripartite keystones. | II |
| 5 Orchard Terrace, Ebberston; 54.23375°N 0.62225°W | — | Late 18th century | The house is in sandstone with quoins and a pantile roof. There are two storeys, one bay and a rear extension. On the left is a doorway, the windows are horizontally-sliding sashes, and all the openings have heavy milled lintels. | II |
| Beckus; 54.23067°N 0.62282°W | — | Late 18th century | The house is in limestone, with sandstone quoins, a paired modillion eaves course, and a pantile roof with coped gables and shaped kneelers. There are two storeys, a double depth plan, and three bays. The central doorway has a divided fanlight, the windows are sashes, and all the openings have flat arches. | II |
| Former Malthouse; 54.23055°N 0.62275°W | — | Late 18th century | The former malthouse is in sandstone with quoins and a hipped pantile roof. There are three storeys, and two bays on the end facing the street. The openings vary and include differing doorways and windows. | II |
| Old Vicarage; 54.20362°N 0.63206°W | — | Late 18th century | The former vicarage is in sandstone, with quoins, a stepped eaves course, and a pantile roof with coped gables and shaped kneelers. There are two storeys and four bays, and a single-storey two-bay extension on the right. On the front is a gabled porch with a doorway, to the right is a blocked doorway, and the windows are sashes. All the openings have lintels with keystones. | II |
| Saint Mary's Cottage; 54.23722°N 0.63448°W | — | Late 18th century | The house is in sandstone, with quoins, a moulded eaves course, and a tile roof with coped gables and shaped kneelers. There are two storeys and three bays, and a rear wing. The doorway is in the centre, the windows are 20th-century replacements, and all the openings have lintels and keystones. | II |
| Spring Farmhouse and outbuilding 54.31373°N 0.57116°W | — | Late 18th century | The farmhouse and outbuilding are in sandstone, and have pantile roofs with coped gables and shaped kneelers. The farmhouse has two storeys and two bays, and the lean-to outbuilding to the left has a single storey. In each part is a doorway, and the windows are horizontally-sliding sashes. | II |
| The Grapes Inn; 54.23564°N 0.62489°W | | Late 18th century | The public house is in sandstone with a pantile roof. There are two storeys, four bays, and a rear wing on the right. The doorway is approached by steps and has a fanlight, the windows are sashes, and the ground floor openings have lintels with raised keystones. | II |
| The Kilns; 54.23048°N 0.62282°W | — | Late 18th century | The house is in sandstone, and has a pantile roof with a coped gable and a shaped kneeler on the left. There are two storeys, two bays and a rear extension. The doorway is in the extension, and on the front are cross windows with lintels and raised keystones in the ground floor, and the upper floor contains casement windows. | II |
| Westwood Granary; 54.23017°N 0.62323°W | — | Late 18th century | A former byre with granary above, a stable, a cartshed and a loose box. The building is in sandstone with quoins and a pantile roof. There is an L-shaped plan, the byre and granary with one storey and a loft, and a single-storey range on the left. The openings include doorways, windows, slit vents and pitching windows. | II |
| 4 Orchard Terrace, Ebberston; 54.23379°N 0.62222°W | — | Late 18th to early 19th century | The house is in sandstone with quoins and a pantile roof. There are two storeys, two bays and a rear extension. The doorway is in the centre, the windows are horizontally-sliding sashes, and all the openings have heavy milled lintels. | II |
| Saint Mary's Mission Room, railings and footbridge 54.22984°N 0.62283°W | | c. 1810 | A Methodist chapel, later a church room, and subsequently a private house, in limestone on a plinth, with a hipped slate roof. There is one storey and three bays. In the centre is a doorway with a divided fanlight, it is flanked by sash windows, all with round heads. The doorway is approached by a footbridge over a beck, flanked by iron railings with slender stick balusters and urn finials. | II |
| Chapel House; 54.23176°N 0.62343°W | — | Early 19th century | A house and a workshop in sandstone on a plinth, with quoins and pantile roofs. The house has two storeys, a double depth plan and two bays. Steps lead up to the central doorway, which is flanked by sash windows with heavy lintels. The windows in the upper floor are horizontally-sliding sashes. The workshop to the left has one storey and a loft and two bays, and it contains a doorway and horizontally-sliding sashes. | II |
| Scamridge Farmhouse; 54.25876°N 0.62447°W | — | Early 19th century | The farmhouse, later a private house, is in limestone with quoins and a slate roof. There are two storeys, two bays, an outshut and a rear extension. The doorway in the right gable end has a fanlight, and the windows are sashes. At the rear is a horizontally-sliding sash window. | II |
| Yew Tree Cottage and Ivy Cottage; 54.22930°N 0.62254°W | — | Early 19th century | A pair of sandstone cottages with a pantile roof. There are two storeys and four bays. Each cottage has a central doorway with a divided fanlight. The left doorway is flanked by sash windows, and the windows flanking the right doorway are horizontally-sliding sashes. | II |
| Brook Villa; 54.23262°N 0.62278°W | — | c. 1840 | The house is in sandstone with quoins and a hipped slate roof. There are two storeys, a double depth plan, and three bays. The middle bay is recessed under a segmental arch, and contains a round-headed doorway with a fanlight. Above it is a blind balustrade, and a round-headed sash window. The other windows are sashes with flat heads. | II |
| St John's Church, Yedingham; 54.20422°N 0.63183°W | | 1862–64 | The chancel of the church was designed by William Butterfield, the nave by Charles Tuke, and the church incorporates earlier material. It is built in sandstone with a stone slate roof, and consists of a three-bay nave and a chancel. At the west end is a wide pilaster buttress with round-arched openings carrying a gabled double bellcote. The south doorway has a round arch and two orders, on paired columns with leaf capitals, the outer order is chamfered, and the inner order incorporates 12th-century moulding. On the sides are sill bands and round-arched windows. | II |
