= Yedingham Priory =

Former Benedictine priory in North Yorkshire, England

Coordinates: 54.206767°N 0.628267°W

Yedingham Priory was a Benedictine priory in North Yorkshire, England dedicated to the Blessed Virgin Mary. It was home to Benedictine nuns from 1163 to 1539.

The priory, also known as Little Mareis, was co founded by Helewise de Clere and Roger II de Clere. There were originally eight or nine nuns, but in time there were twelve with a prioress.

In about 1512, a fourteen year old girl called Elizabeth Lutton became a Benedictiine nun. For twelve years the convent's authorities thought her situation was fine although it was said that she privately complained that she had become a nun despite her wishes.

In 1526 Agnes Brayerdricke succeeded Dame Elizabeth White as head of the convent and Brayerdricke soon discovered that Elizabeth Lutton was pregnant. Brayerdricke had her separated from the other nuns until the child was born and she was then allowed to resume her place as a nun.

Robert Constable of Flamborough visited Yedingham Priory where he learned about Elizabeth Lutton. After she was taken back into the priory Constable encouraged Thomas Scaseby to elope with Elizabeth Lutton in 1531. Scaseby may have been the father of the child and he married Lutton. Constable's motives for getting involved was that Elizabeth was a potential heiress and the marriage was to Constable's advantage in his own territorial disputes.

Robert Constable was executed at Hull for sundry crimes on 6 July 1537 being hanged in chains over Beverley gate at Hull.

The priory was suppressed in 1539. One wall, believed to be the south wall of the church, survives as part of the Old Abbey, Yedingham.

== See also ==
- Listed buildings in Ebberston and Yedingham
