= John Constable (epigrammatist) =

English epigrammatist

- Occupation: Epigrammatist

John Constable (fl. 1520) was an English epigrammatist.

== Biography ==
Constable was the son of Roger and Isabel Constable of London, was educated at St. Paul's School during the mastership of William Lilly. Thence he went to Oxford and entered Byham Hall, of which John Plaisted was head. This hall stood in Merton Street, opposite the college church, and its site is now in the possession of Corpus Christi College. Constable took the degrees of B.A. in 1511, and M.A. in 1515, when, according to Anthony à Wood, he left the university with the reputation of a great rhetorician and poet. The titles of two books by him are known, but only one, it is believed, is now extant. "Joannis Constablii Londinensis et artium professoris epigrammata. Apud inclytam Londini Urbem. mdxx.," printed by Ric. Pynson. The epigrams are addressed to contemporary personages of note, among whom are Henry VIII and Catherine of Aragon, Sir Thomas More, Hugh Latimer, Lilly, his old schoolmaster, and others. A brother Richard and sister Martha are also mentioned. Wood prints two as specimens, one addressed to Plaisted, the master of Byham Hall, and the other to Constable's Oxford friends. This volume hardly justifies his reputation as a poet, as the epigrams are dull and pointless, though the versification is correct. There is a copy of this book in the Bodleian Library, which formerly belonged to Robert Burton, author of The Anatomy of Melancholy. His other work was entitled "Querela Veritatis," but nothing is known of it except that the first words were "Destinavimus tibi hunc nostrum." There was another John Constable, his contemporary, who was dean of Lincoln 1514–28, but he belonged to the well-known Yorkshire family, being the fourth son of Sir Robert Constable of Flamborough (see Cooper, Athenæ Cantabrigienses, i. 35, 527).
