= Ebberston and Yedingham =

Coordinates: 54.2169°N 0.6289°W

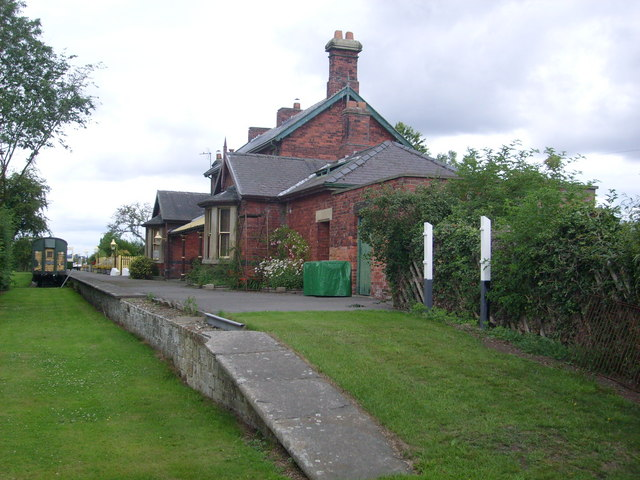
- Ebberston station house

- Location within North Yorkshire
- Area: 27.08 km^{2} (10.46 sq mi)
- Population: 593 (2021 census)
  - Density: 22/km^{2} (57/sq mi)
- Civil parish: Ebberston and Yedingham
- Unitary authority: North Yorkshire
- Ceremonial county: North Yorkshire
- Region: Yorkshire and the Humber
- Country: England
- Sovereign state: United Kingdom
- UK Parliament: Thirsk and Malton

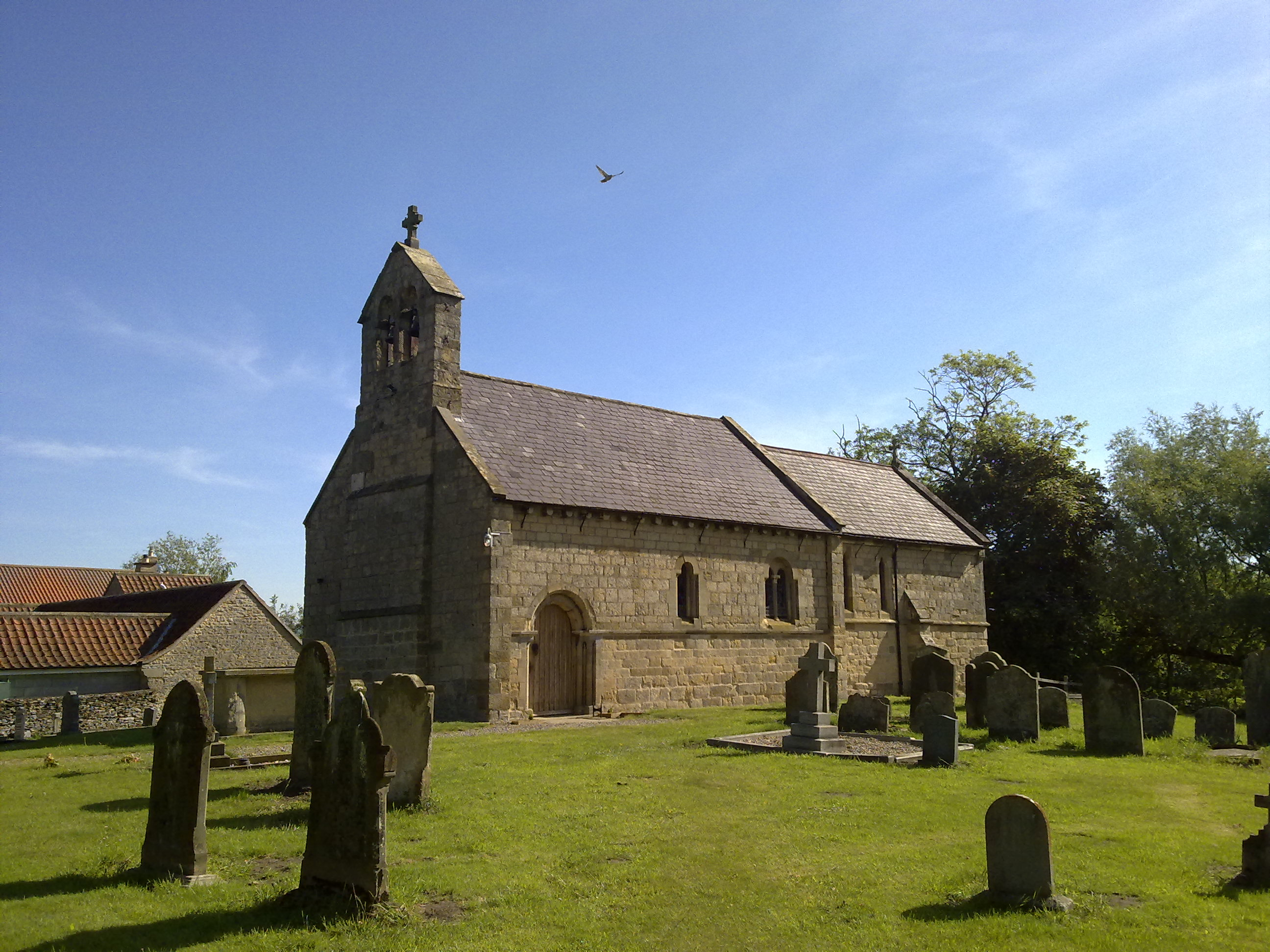
Yedingham

Ebberston and Yedingham is a civil parish in North Yorkshire, in England.

The parish was formed on 1 April 1986 from the merger of Ebberston and Yedingham. The predecessor parishes were originally in the North Riding of Yorkshire and East Riding of Yorkshire respectively, but in 1974 to 2023 were both placed in the new Ryedale district of North Yorkshire. It is now administered by the unitary North Yorkshire Council. In addition to the two villages, the parish also includes the hamlet of Bickley.

The parish covers 2,706 hectares, and in the 2021 UK census had a recorded population of 593 people.

== See also ==
- Listed buildings in Ebberston and Yedingham
