= St Mary's Church, Ebberston =

Church in Ebberston, North Yorkshire, England

Coordinates: 54°14′16″N 0°37′59″W

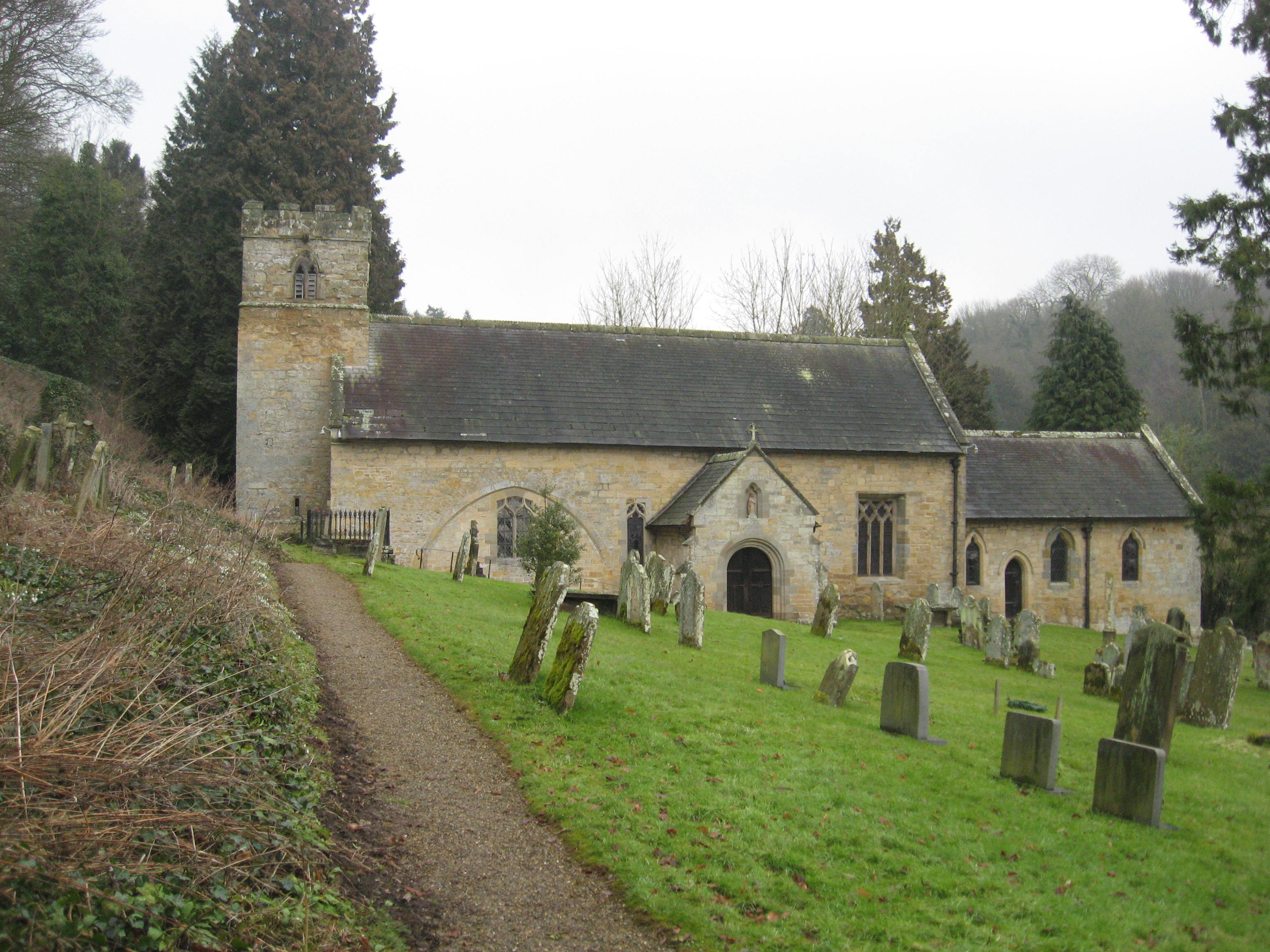
The church, in 2010

St Mary's Church is the parish church of Ebberston, a village in North Yorkshire, in England.

The church was built in the 12th century, at which time it appears to have consisted of a nave and chancel. Surviving features from this period include the doorway in the south wall of the nave, and the font. In about 1200, a north aisle was added, while the chancel was largely rebuilt and the nave extended later in the century, and a south chapel was added. The tower probably dates from the 14th century, while around the time of the English Reformation, the chapel was demolished. The building was reroofed in 1797, and the church was restored between 1870 and 1876, by Ewan Christian. He added a porch, and rebuilt the south side of the nave and chancel. The building was grade II* listed in 1953.

The church is built of sandstone with a slate roof, and consists of a nave, a north aisle, a south porch, a chancel and a west tower. The tower has two stages, two-light louvred bell openings with trefoil heads and hood moulds, and an embattled parapet. The porch is gabled and the doorway has a round arch, recessed in two orders, with roll-moulding and a scalloped capital. There is a grotesque head on the north wall, which is probably 14th century but in an earlier style.

== See also ==
- Grade II* listed churches in North Yorkshire (district)
- Listed buildings in Ebberston and Yedingham
