= Elizabeth Lutton =

English Benedictine nun

- Born: 1498
- Died: before 1553
- Occupation: nun
- Known for: becoming pregnant
- Spouse: Thomas Scaseby
- Partner: Thomas Scaseby
- Children: one

Elizabeth Lutton or Elizabeth Sutton or "Mrs Thomas Scaseby" (1498–before 1553) was an English Benedictine nun (and potential heiress) who became pregnant. She was abducted and married. The marriage was "contrary to the laws of God", and she was returned to Yedingham Priory.

== Life ==
Lutton was born about 1498. Her father was Stephen Lutton, and her grandfather, William Lutton, owned land in Knapton. About 1512, when she was fourteen years old, she became a Benedictine nun at Yedingham Priory in North Yorkshire. She later complained that she had become a nun contrary to her wishes.

In 1526 Agnes Brayerdricke succeeded Dame Elizabeth White as head of Yedingham Priory and Brayerdricke soon discovered that Elizabeth Lutton was pregnant. Brayerdricke had her separated from the other nuns until the child was born. Lutton was then allowed to resume her place.

Local landowner Robert Constable of Flamborough visited Yedingham Priory where he learned about Elizabeth Lutton. Constable encouraged Thomas Scaseby to elope with Elizabeth Lutton in 1531. Scaseby may have been the father of the child, and he married Lutton. This was a serious crime, as Lutton was still under vows as a nun. Constable's motive for getting involved was that Elizabeth was a potential heiress, and the marriage was to Constable's advantage in his own territorial disputes. Lutton argued that she had become a nun under duress, and she was therefore free to marry and to inherit her grandfather's lands. She was supported by the Abbess but not by any of the other nuns.

== Result ==
Lutton's uncle took the resulting dispute to the Star Chamber. He had inherited Lutton's grandfather's lands, and Constable had seized them, citing Lutton's marriage. In 1532, an ecclesiastical judge from York arrived to interview all who were involved. The judges decided that Lutton's marriage was "contrary to the laws of God and Holly Church, and to the detestable and pernicious example of all other lyke offendors, and to the ruin and decay of holly religion". Lutton returned to being a nun, and her uncle recovered his lands.

Robert Constable was executed at Hull for (other) sundry crimes on 6 July 1537. The priory was suppressed in August 1539, and the eight or nine nuns were pensioned off. One of these was Elizabeth Sutton, and this is presumed to be Lutton who received 26 shillings and eight pence. A later record in February 1553 listed the nuns who were still receiving a pension, but she was not included in that list.
