= Robert Constable (soldier, died 1558) =

English soldier (1495–1558)

Sir Robert Constable
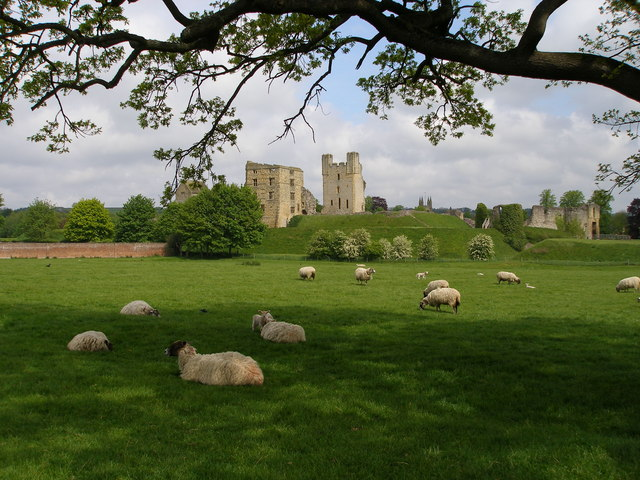
- Remains of Helmsley Castle, home of the family of Sir Robert Constable's wife, Catherine Manners
- Born: before 1495
- Died: 12 October 1558
- Spouse: Catherine Manners
- Issue: Sir Marmaduke Constable; Sir Robert Constable; John Constable; Michael Constable; George Constable; Thomas Constable; Barbara Constable; Margaret Constable; Everild Constable; Elizabeth Constable; Eleanor Constable
- Father: Sir Marmaduke Constable
- Mother: Barbara Sothill

Sir Robert Constable (before 1495 – 12 October 1558), of Everingham, Yorkshire, was an English soldier who fought against the Scots for Henry VIII in the 1540s, Member of Parliament and Sheriff. He was the grandfather of the poet, Henry Constable.

== Family ==
Robert Constable was the eldest son of Sir Marmaduke Constable (c. 1480 – 14 September 1545), of Everingham, the second son of Sir Marmaduke Constable (c. 1456/7 – 1518) of Flamborough, Yorkshire, and Joyce Stafford, daughter of Sir Humphrey Stafford (1400 – 7 June 1450) of Grafton, Worcestershire, slain at Sevenoaks by the rebel, Jack Cade, and Eleanor Aylesbury (born c. 1406).

Constable's mother was Barbara Sothill (c. 1474 – 4 October 1540), the daughter and heir of John Sothill, esquire, of Everingham, Yorkshire, by his first wife, Agnes Ingleby, the daughter of Sir William Ingleby.

He had a brother, William Constable, who was a cleric, and a sister, Everild Constable.

== Career ==
According to Bindoff, like his father and grandfather Constable saw much service in the Scottish wars. He was knighted by Edward Seymour, Earl of Hertford, at Butterdean near Coldingham in the campaign of 1544. In the following spring he was taken prisoner, and wrote the 5th Earl of Shrewsbury requesting that he either be ransomed or exchanged for Scottish prisoners taken by the English including the Laird of Innerwick.

On 14 January 1550 Constable wrote to Francis Talbot, 5th Earl of Shrewsbury, Lord President of the North, from Everingham that he had a Scottish prisoner with him, Archibald Douglas, Laird of Glenbervie, but that he did not know who had captured him.

He was a Member of Parliament (MP) for Yorkshire in March and October 1553 and perhaps in 1555. At the county election, he probably had the support of both the Earl of Shrewsbury and the Earl of Rutland, Constable's brother-in-law.

Constable served as Sheriff of Yorkshire in 1557–8. He made his will on 1 September, and died on 29 October 1558.

== Marriage and issue ==
Constable married, around 1520 and before 1530, Catherine Manners (c. 1510 – c. 1547), the daughter of George Manners, 11th Baron de Ros of Helmsley Castle and Anne St. Leger, by whom he had eleven children, six sons and five daughters. She was a matrilineal descendant of Cecily Neville, Duchess of York, and the mitochondrial DNA descent through which the remains of Richard III of England were identified in 2013 passes through her and their daughters Barbara and Everhilda:

- Sir Marmaduke Constable (d. 1 February 1575), eldest son and heir, who married Jane Conyers (d. 4 December 1558), daughter of Sir Christopher Conyers by Anne Dacre, daughter of Thomas Dacre, Baron Dacre of Gilsland.
- Sir Robert Constable (d. 12 November 1591), who married Christiana Dabridgecourt, widow of Anthony Forster, and daughter of John Dabridgecourt of Langdon Hall, Warwickshire. Their only child was the poet, Henry Constable.
- John Constable.
- Michael Constable.
- George Constable.
- Thomas Constable.
- Barbara Constable (c. 1530 – c. 1561), who married, as his first wife, Sir William Babthorpe, son of Sir William Babthorpe, and had issue. Suspected of Catholicism, Babthorpe proved his loyalty to Elizabeth I by helping to quell the Northern Rebellion of 1569 which attempted to place Mary Queen of Scots on the throne. Among the couple's children was Margaret Babthorpe (1550–1628), wife in about 1575 of Sir Henry Cholmley.
- Margaret Constable, who married Thomas Saltmarsh.
- Everild Constable, also known as Everhilda (c. 1535 – ?), who married Thomas Crawthorne.
- Elizabeth Constable, who married Edward Ellerker (d. 28 December 1586).
- Eleanor Constable.
