= Ebberston =

Village in North Yorkshire, England

Coordinates: 54°13′54″N 0°37′24″W

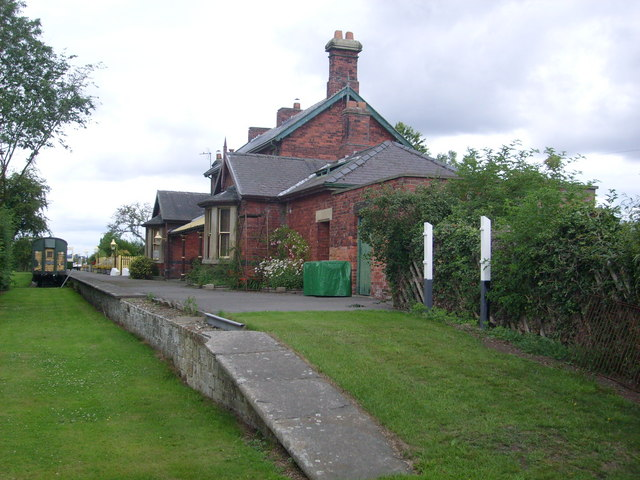
- Ebberston station house

- Location within North Yorkshire
- OS grid reference: SE898824
- Civil parish: Ebberston and Yedingham
- Unitary authority: North Yorkshire
- Ceremonial county: North Yorkshire
- Region: Yorkshire and the Humber
- Country: England
- Sovereign state: United Kingdom
- Post town: SCARBOROUGH
- Postcode district: YO13
- Police: North Yorkshire
- Fire: North Yorkshire
- Ambulance: Yorkshire

Ebberston is a village and former civil parish, now in the parish of Ebberston and Yedingham in North Yorkshire, England, and is 34 miles (55 km) east from the county town of Northallerton. In 1961 the parish had a population of 466.

== History ==
The name Ebberston derives from the Old English Eadbrihtstūn meaning 'Eadbriht's settlement'.

Ebberston used to be in the wapentake of Pickering Lythe. A cairn north-east from the village is dedicated to Alfrid, King of Northumberland, who supposedly sought sanctuary in a cave here before being removed to Little Driffield where he died.

Between 1882 and 1950 the village was served by Ebberston railway station at Allerston, and on the Forge Valley Line between Scarborough and Pickering.

On 1 April 1986 the parish was abolished and merged with Yedingham to form "Ebberston and Yedingham".

Between 1974 and 2023 the village was part of the Ryedale district. It is now administered by North Yorkshire Council.

On 18 August 2009 a 500 lb unexploded bomb was destroyed in a controlled explosion next to the village which necessitated the evacuation of hundreds of local residents from Ebberston and Allerston. The bomb hailed from a 'Whitley Mark V Bomber', of the No. 102 Squadron RAF, based at RAF Linton-on-Ouse which crash landed on 27 October 1940, with all personnel having bailed out and survived.

== Community ==
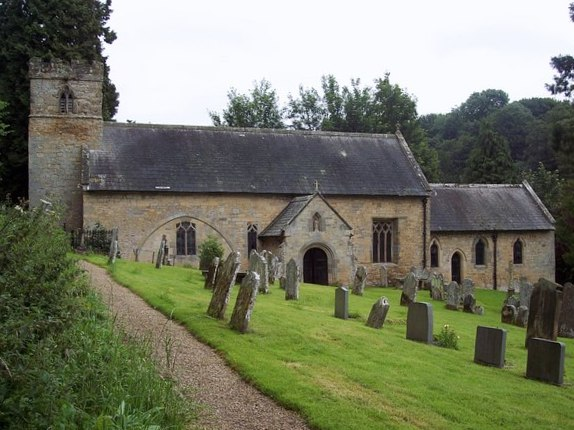
Church of St Mary the Virgin

Ebberston is a linear settlement of 1,300 yards (1,200 m) between the A170 Thirsk to Scarborough road at the north, and the B1258 road and Penniston Lane at the south which runs between Allerston and Snainton. The principal north–south route through the village is Main Street; the A170 through the village being High Street.

Bus service 128, with stops on Main Street, runs between Scarborough and Pickering.

The Grade II* listed 12th-century St Mary's Church, Ebberston, restored by Ewan Christian in 1870, is 850 yards (780 m) to the west of the village, just to the north off the A170. Businesses and amenities include, at the south, Ebberston Sportsfield and a garden centre with nursery; on Main Street a village hall, holiday cottage accommodation, a sign maker, and a handicraft studio; and on High Street, The Grapes Inn public house, further holiday cottage accommodation and a bed & breakfast. At the edge of the parish to the west of the village is a race track for model vehicles.

North from the A170 is Chafer Wood Nature Reserve, managed by Yorkshire Wildlife Trust.

== See also ==
- Listed buildings in Ebberston and Yedingham
