= Queen's Head, Stepney =

Pub in Stepney (Limehouse), London

Coordinates: 51.513858°N 0.0387804°W

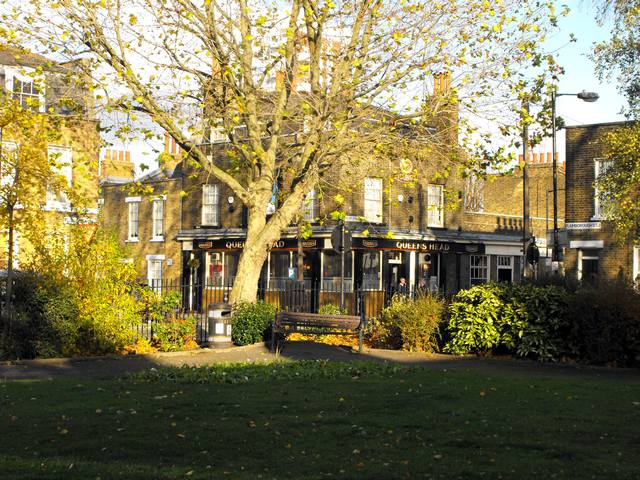
The Queen's Head, 2008

The Queen's Head is a pub at 8 Flamborough Street, Stepney, London E14. Known as "The Queen'S Head Limehouse", currently run by a group of locals who took over and opened in December 2023 and operate as a free house.

It is a Grade II listed building, opened in 1827. It is believed to be the pub which inspired the Queen Vic on EastEnders and is also the pub which The Queen Mother once famously pulled THAT pint.
