= Constable (disambiguation) =

A constable is a person holding a particular office, most commonly in law enforcement.

Constable may also refer to:

- Constable (surname), including a list of people and fictional characters with the name
  - John Constable (1776–1837), English painter
- Constable Bequest, an 1888 donation of art
- Constable, New York, a town in the United States
- Constable Bay, in Greenland
- "Constables", a song by O.C. from his 1994 album Word...Life
- The Constable, a 2013 Hong Kong film
- Dichorragia nesimachus, or the constable, a butterfly

== See also ==
- Lord High Constable (disambiguation)
- Constable & Robinson, publishers
- Constable Constable, a 1985 TV spinoff of The Beachcombers
