= Robert Constable (soldier, died 1591) =

English soldier and Member of Parliament

Sir Robert Constable
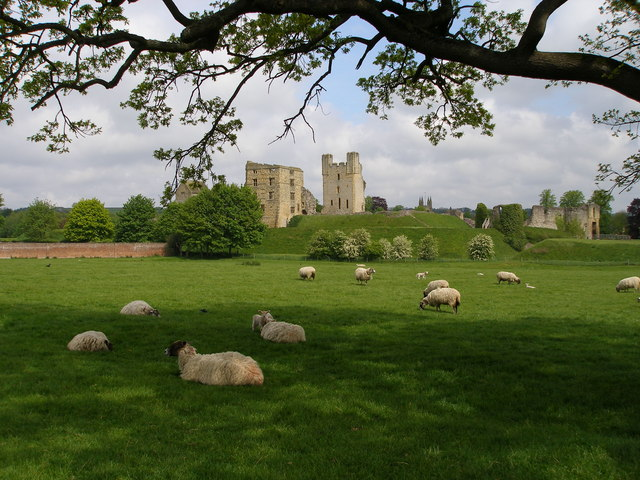
- Remains of Helmsley Castle, home of the family of Sir Robert Constable's mother, Katherine Manners
- Born: c.1522
- Died: 12 November 1591 (aged 68–69)
- Buried: Holy Trinity Minories, London
- Spouse: Christiana Dabridgecourt
- Issue: Henry Constable
- Father: Sir Robert Constable
- Mother: Katherine Manners

Sir Robert Constable (c. 1522 – 12 November 1591), of Newark-on-Trent, Nottinghamshire, and the Minories, London, was an English soldier and Member of Parliament.

== Biography ==
Robert Constable, born about 1522, was the second son of Sir Robert Constable, (Note: Robert Constable (died 1558) was the eldest son of Sir Marmaduke Constable, of Everingham, Yorkshireand Barbara Sothill (died 1540), the daughter and heir of John Sothill) of Everingham. and his wife Katherine, daughter of George Manners, 11th Baron de Ros of Helmsley Castle, and Anne, only daughter and heiress of Sir Thomas St. Leger. (Note: Through his mother's mother (Anne of York) Constable was descended from Richard Plantagenet, 3rd Duke of York, father of King Edward IV and King Richard III, and from Richard of Conisburgh, 3rd Earl of Cambridge, executed 5 August 1415 for his part in the Southampton Plot against King Henry V.)

Constable's elder brother Marmaduke who was about thirty-eight years of age, succeeded to the family property in 1558 when their father died. Marmaduke died on 13 May 1560.

As a younger son, Constable made his own way. His marriage to Christiana Dabridgecourt may have occasioned his decision to settle in Newark-on-Trent, where her first husband, Anthony Forster, had been an alderman. Constable later acquired from the Hospital of St. Leonard the lease of a property known as the Spittal on the northern outskirts of Newark. According to Hasler it is almost certain that he was the Robert Constable, gentleman pensioner, who towards the end of the reign of Queen Mary, as a reward for his service, was made constable of Queenborough Castle. It is also almost certain that he was the Sir Robert Constable listed by Segar as one of the 'lords and gentlemen' who had participated in Queen Elizabeth's Accession Day tournaments.

=== Rising of the North ===
Robert Constable served under Thomas Radclyffe, 3rd Earl of Sussex, in the campaign after the Northern Rebellion of 1569. He made several journeys into Scotland to spy on the fugitive leaders of the failed rebellion in January 1570. He spoke to the Earl of Westmorland at Ferniehirst and was told that Anne Percy, Countess of Northumberland had gone to Hume Castle and Regent Moray had taken the Earl of Northumberland to Lochleven Castle. Constable then went to Cavers Castle to spy on Richard Norton. Constable carried the Earl of Westmorland's ring to Jane Howard, Countess of Westmorland at Brancepeth as a token, and promised to take her gifts to Ferniehirst. Ralph Sadler passed Constable's letters to William Cecil, who showed them to Elizabeth I. Sadler reported that she was pleased with Constable's covert work, and the mention of a "golden hook", rewards for the capture and rendition of the rebels.

On 17 April 1570, Constable went with Lord Hunsdon to Jedburgh, took Ferniehirst Castle, and burnt Hawick, Branxholme and Bedrule. On 27 April, he joined the siege of Hume Castle. He was knighted by Sussex at Berwick on 11 May 1570, together with William Drury, Thomas Manners, and George Carey, who were captains in the army sent into Scotland on the following day to assist the Earl of Lennox in the Marian civil war at Glasgow.

=== Marshal of Berwick ===
Constable received leases of lands 'for his service to the Queen in the wars', and 'for his service during the late rebellion in the north', and later composed a treatise on the 'Ordering of a Camp'. In 1575 he was appointed Marshal of Berwick. On 2 February 1576 he wrote to his kinsman, Edward Manners, 3rd Earl of Rutland, son and heir of his first cousin, Henry Manners, 2nd Earl of Rutland, complaining that he had not received any imprest money, and requesting the Earl to pass on his thanks to Sir Francis Walsingham, for 'I have not found so great a friend as he. I know that I have this friendship for your sake, for I was a mere stranger to him'. Constable was soon requesting to be relieved of the position. On 25 May 1576 he wrote to the Earl that he had been 'in very good hope that I should have been discharged of this office, but I am now stayed'. He complained that 'No one ever lived here at so great a charge as I do', and that the garrison had been unpaid since Michaelmas. In 1577 he was still at Berwick, from which he wrote on 25 March that he had been 'very sick'. In about September 1577 he wrote to the Earl that 'Riding about the Queen's works here my horse has fallen upon me and bruised me so much that I am not able to stir out of my bed. . . The fall was so great that my sword was broken into three pieces'. He complained that he could 'get no help of physic', and although he hoped to escape danger from the injury, 'it will be very hard in consideration of my old years'. He was finally allowed to resign in August 1578. Lord Burghley commented that Constable had been 'beggared' as a result of his time spent at Berwick.

According to Hasler, Constable now lived "as a country gentleman" on his properties in Nottinghamshire. Nevertheless, in May 1585 he was in London. In a letter dated 18 May 1585 to the Earl of Rutland he described a recent event at Greenwich:

I have been before her Majesty with my people at Greenwich, where Mr Treasurer and I did show it in such sort that it was to her Majesty's contentment, and well liking of all the whole people, and such a skirmish maintained as the like hath not been at any time, for it never ceased until her Majesty gave commandment it should cease. And after the skirmish she did cause that we should pause awhile for the cooling of their pieces, and so to begin, which latter skirmish exceeded that the French ambassador and all the counsellors did greatly commend it .... And so every captain went with his company, [and] marched home to London that night.

Constable reported further that the Queen had sent Sir Walter Raleigh to him with her thanks, and that later she had let him kiss her hand, saying that she had 'taken such order for me as I should not mislike of'. It may have been as a result of this performance that Constable was appointed Lieutenant-General of the Ordnance at some time before 4 August 1588.

In 1587 Constable was a principal mourner at the Earl of Rutland's funeral. The precise date of Constable's own death is unknown. He was buried in Holy Trinity Minories on 12 November 1591.

== Family ==
Constable married, before 1562, Christiana Dabridgecourt, widow of Anthony Forster, and daughter of John Dabridgecourt of Langdon Hall, Warwickshire. Their only child was the poet, Henry Constable.

== Notes ==
Military offices
Preceded by Sir William Pelham	Lieutenant-General of the Ordnance; 1588–1591	Succeeded by Sir George Carew
