= Frank Challice Constable =

English barrister and writer

- Born: 16 June 1846; Edmonton, Middlesex
- Died: 7 October 1937 (aged 91); Ascot, Berkshire
- Occupations: Barrister; Writer
- Writing career
- Pen name: Colin Clout

Frank Challice Constable (16 June 1846 – 7 October 1937) was an English barrister and writer. In addition to publishing under his own name, he published some works as F C Constable, and others as Colin Clout. His works included two science fiction novels: The Curse of Intellect (1895) and Aunt Judith's Island (1898). Under the pseudonym Colin Clout, he also published the book Norman; or, Inherited Fate in 1894. As a barrister, he served as a public prosecutor for the province in British India from 1872 to 1892.
