= Charles Constable =

Charles Constable may refer to:

- Charles Golding Constable (1821–1878), member of the British East India Company's navy
- Charles H. Constable (1817–1865), American attorney, politician, judge, and real estate entrepreneur
