= Yedingham =

Village in North Yorkshire, England

Coordinates: 54°12′11″N 0°37′57″W

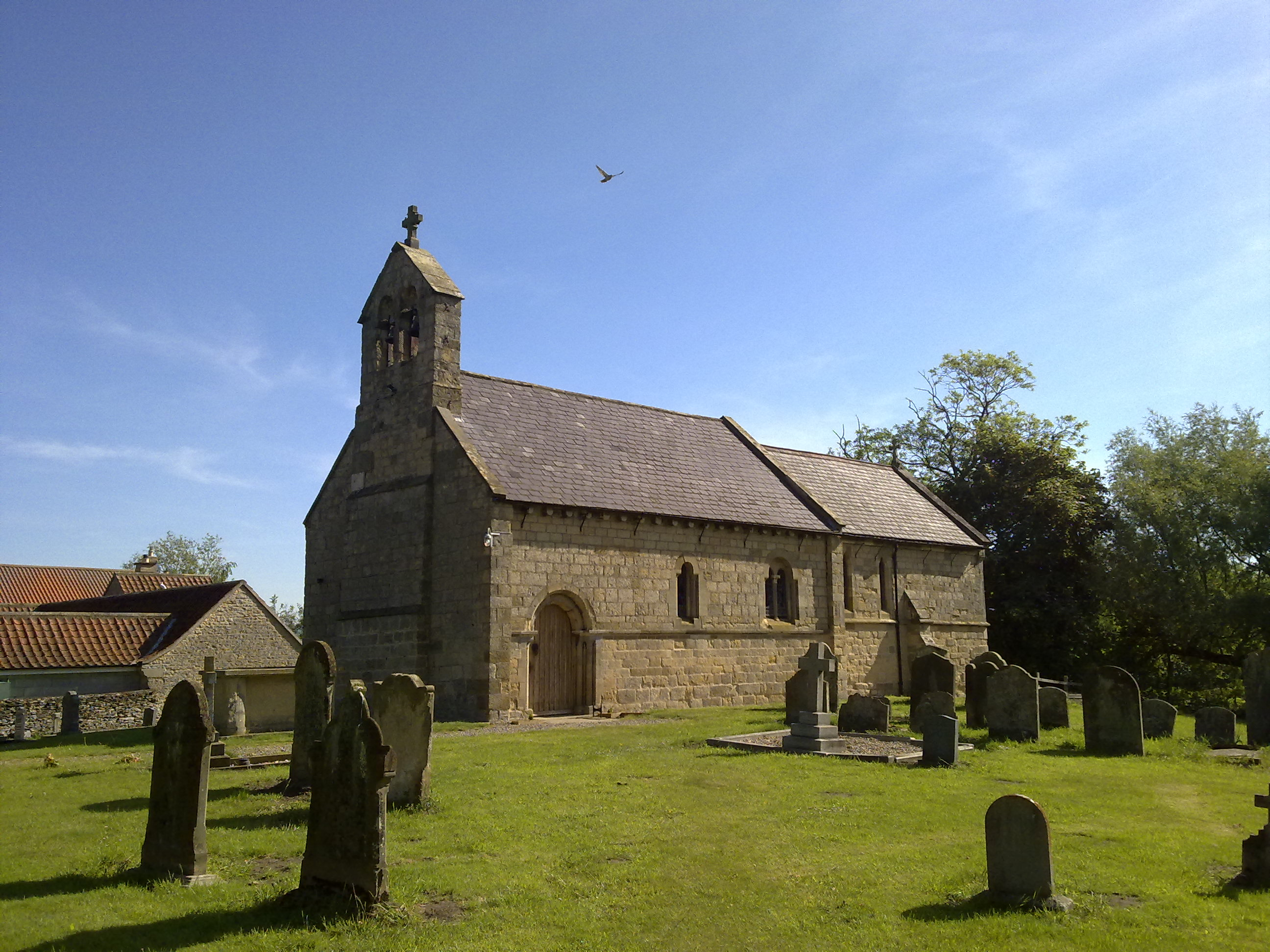
- St John the Baptist's Church

- Location within North Yorkshire
- OS grid reference: SE892795
- Civil parish: Ebberston and Yedingham
- Unitary authority: North Yorkshire
- Ceremonial county: North Yorkshire
- Region: Yorkshire and the Humber
- Country: England
- Sovereign state: United Kingdom
- Post town: MALTON
- Postcode district: YO17
- Police: North Yorkshire
- Fire: North Yorkshire
- Ambulance: Yorkshire
- UK Parliament: Thirsk and Malton

Yedingham is a village and former civil parish, now in the parish of Ebberston and Yedingham, halfway between West Knapton and Allerston, nine miles north-east of Malton in North Yorkshire, England.

It was historically part of the East Riding of Yorkshire until 1974. The village was part of the Ryedale district between 1974 and 2023. It is now administered by North Yorkshire Council.

In 1961 the parish had a population of 95.

== History ==
The village name is thought to derive from Old English, once meaning 'Homestead of Eada and his people'.

On 1 April 1986 the parish was abolished and merged with Ebberston to form "Ebberston and Yedingham".

St John's Church, Yedingham lies in the village, and the River Derwent flows through to its north. The original bridge crossing the Derwent was built in 1731. This was replaced by the current bridge built in 1970.

The village hall can be found next to The Providence, a public house.

To the north of the village lies the remains of the Yedingham Priory. This was home to Benedictine nuns from 1163 to 1539.

== See also ==
- Listed buildings in Ebberston and Yedingham
- Yedingham Priory
