= Margery le Despenser =

Margery (Margaret) le Despenser, de jure suo jure 3rd Baroness le Despenser (1387 creation), was the daughter and heiress of Philip le Despenser, 2nd Baron le Despenser. She was born about 1400 in Nettlestead, Suffolk, England, and married John de Ros, 7th Baron de Ros. He died without heirs, and she married secondly Roger Wentworth of Nettlestead, Esq. (d.1452), son of John Wentworth of North Elmsall.

== Life ==
Ethel Seaton writes:

Lord John Roos’s wife, Margery Despenser, did not mourn her husband for long; it is true that she could have seen little of him. In less than a year from the day of Baugé, she married Roger Wentworth of Elmsall, armiger, ‘dishonourably and without licence from the king’. It is possible that her undistinguished choice alienated her from her Roos connexions more than did her haste to remarry. She seems to have become entirely a Wentworth, devoted to her son Philip; at the same time, she retained her Roos name and title. Her will of 1478 has no mention of Roos though her youngest brother-in-law, Sir Richard, was still alive. The only memorable thing about her is her patronage, in the wake of Margaret of Anjou and Elizabeth Wydville, of Queens’ College, Cambridge. There she founded a Fellowship c. 1470, and in 1472 made gifts to the Chapel, where she wished to be buried. At her death in April 1478, she left to its President, Andrew Dokett, a covered goblet, ‘cum Armis dni. de Roos’ (P.C.C. Wills, Wattys 33). She and her first husband and her youngest brother-in-law are all remembered, together with many royal persons, in the ‘Commemoration of Benefactors’ of the College.

For marrying "dishonourably without license from the king" before 2 March 1422/3 Roger Wentworth, Esq., younger son of John Wentworth, of Elmsall, Yorkshire, Margery was ordered to pay a fine of at least £1000 for having married "so far beneath her."

== Issue ==
- Sir Philip Wentworth, married Mary Clifford, daughter of John Clifford, 7th Baron de Clifford and Lady Elizabeth Percy. His son, Sir Henry Wentworth, de jure 4th Baron le Despenser, was the maternal grandfather to Jane Seymour, third consort of King Henry VIII, and ancestor to the Barons Wentworth. They are also ancestors to Meghan, Duchess of Sussex.
- Henry Wentworth of Codham Hall, married firstly to Elizabeth Howard, daughter of Henry Howard of Teringhampton; and secondly to Joan FitzSymonds, daughter of Robert FitzSymonds. He had issue by both wives.
- Agnes Wentworth, married Sir Robert Constable; they had six sons which included Sir Marmaduke Constable and seven daughters including Agnes Constable, wife of Sir William Tyrwhitt.
- Margaret Wentworth, married Sir William Hopton and had issue. Sir William Hopton and Margery Wentworth were the grandparents of Sir Arthur Hopton.
- Elizabeth Wentworth, married John Calthorpe, and had Agnes Calthorpe who married Charles Knyvett, and Anne Calthorpe who married Edward Knyvett of Stanway, Margaret Calthorpe, Abbess of Bruisyard Abbey, and Sir Philip Calthorpe who had Sir Philip Calthorpe who married Amata Boleyn, the daughter of Sir William Boleyn of Blickling and aunt of Anne Boleyn, Dorothy Calthorpe, a nun, Elizabeth Calthorpe who died young, Henry Calthorpe who died ob. s.p., Thomas Calthorpe who married Anne le Strange, daughter of Sir Thomas le Strange, but died ob. s.p., Katherine Calthorpe who married Sir Anthony Heveningham, who married secondly Mary Shelton, and Anne Calthorpe, Countess of Sussex.
