= Marmaduke Constable =

English soldier and courtier

Sir Marmaduke Constable
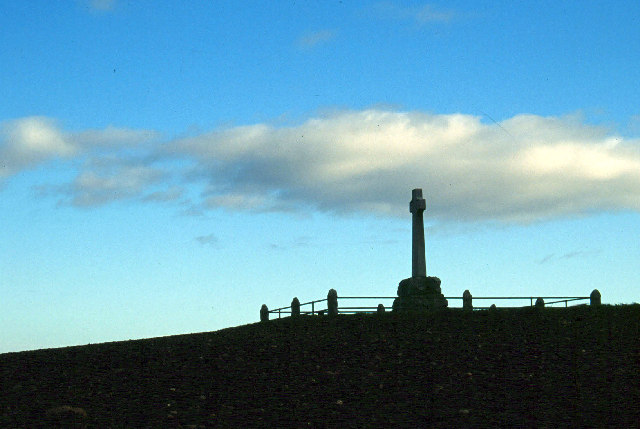
- Memorial at Flodden Field, where Marmaduke Constable commanded the left wing
- Born: c.1456/7
- Died: 10 November 1518
- Buried: Church of St Oswald, Flamborough, Yorkshire
- Spouses: Margery FitzHugh; Joyce Stafford
- Issue: Sir Robert Constable; Sir Marmaduke Constable; Sir William Constable; Sir John Constable; Agnes Constable; Eleanor Constable
- Father: Sir Robert Constable
- Mother: Agnes Wentworth

Sir Marmaduke Constable (c. 1456/57 – 20 November 1518) of Flamborough, Yorkshire, was a courtier and soldier during the reigns of Richard III, Henry VII and Henry VIII.

== Biography ==
Constable was born around 1456/7. (Note: He was said to be 31 at his father's death in 1488.) He was the eldest son and heir of Sir Robert Constable (4 April 1423 – 23 May 1488) of Flamborough, Yorkshire, and Agnes Wentworth (d. 20 April 1496), daughter of Roger Wentworth of North Elmsall, Yorkshire, by Margery le Despencer. (Note: He had five brothers: Robert (late 1450s – 1501), (Note: Richardson states that Robert was knighted.) a lawyer; Philip; John, who became Dean of Lincoln; Sir William; and Roger, and seven sisters, Elizabeth, who married Sir Thomas Metham; Margaret, who married Sir William Eure; Agnes, who married firstly Sir Walter Griffith, and secondly Sir Gervase Clifton; Margery, who married Sir Ralph Bigod; Anne, who married Sir William Tyrwhit of Kettleby, Lincolnshire; Agnes, who married Sir William Scargill, and Katherine, who married Ralph Ryther, esquire.)

According to Horrox, the Constables of Flamborough were followers of the Percys. Marmaduke's father was in the service of King Edward IV in 1461, but by 1470, both Marmaduke and his father were in the service of Henry Percy, 4th Earl of Northumberland. Marmaduke campaigned with the Earl in Scotland in the early 1480s, and Northumberland knighted him at Berwick in August 1482. Marmaduke's epitaph states that he had been with Edward IV in France in 1475, perhaps under Northumberland.

By December 1483, Constable was a knight of the body to King Richard III, and was granted forfeited lands after Buckingham's rebellion. On 28 March 1484, the King granted him the constableship of Tutbury Castle, and other offices.

According to Horrox, it is unclear whether Constable fought for Richard III at Bosworth. In any case, he was not attainted, and was granted a pardon by Henry VII on 18 November 1485, was a knight of the body to the King by May 1486, and accompanied him to the wars in France in 1492.

Constable succeeded his father in May 1488, and in November of that year, became sheriff of Yorkshire. The first three years of Henry VII's reign were disrupted by risings in the North. Constable's brother-in-law, Sir Humphrey Stafford of Grafton, Worcestershire, was executed at Tyburn on 8 July 1486 for his involvement with Francis Lovell's rising in Yorkshire in 1486, and the Earl of Northumberland was killed by a Yorkshire mob in a rising in 1489. After Northumberland's death, Constable became an associate of Thomas Howard, then Earl of Surrey, who nominated him in 1509 to the Order of the Garter. In 1513, Constable commanded the left wing at the Battle of Flodden under Howard, for which service he received a letter of thanks from the King dated 26 November 1514, in which he is addressed as Sir Marmaduke Constable the elder, 'called the little'.

Constable died on 10 November 1518, after swallowing a frog while drinking a glass of water. In the Church of St Oswald in Flamborough one may still read a rhyming epitaph describing his life and prowess.

== Marriages and issue ==
Constable married firstly Margery FitzHugh, daughter of Henry FitzHugh, 5th Baron FitzHugh, and sister to Alice and Elizabeth FitzHugh, by whom he had no issue.

Constable married secondly Joyce Stafford, daughter of Sir Humphrey Stafford (1400 – 7 June 1450) of Grafton, Worcestershire, slain at Sevenoaks by the rebel, Jack Cade, and Eleanor Aylesbury (born c.1406), the daughter of Sir Thomas Aylesbury (d. 9 September 1418) and his second wife, Katherine Pabenham (c.1372 – 17 June 1436), by whom he had four sons and two daughters:

- Sir Robert Constable (c.1478–1537), knighted at Blackheath on 17 June 1497, and executed for treason for taking part in the Pilgrimage of Grace. He married Jane Ingleby, the daughter of Sir William Ingleby of Ripley, Yorkshire, by whom he had three sons and four or five daughters.
- Sir Marmaduke Constable (c.1480 – 14 September 1545), who was knighted after the Battle of Flodden in 1513, and attended the Queen at the Field of the Cloth of Gold in 1520. He was a Knight of the Shire (MP) for Yorkshire, and a member of the Council of the North from 1537 until his death. He married Barbara Sothill (c.1474 – 4 October 1540), the daughter and heir of John Sothill, esquire, of Everingham, Yorkshire, by his first wife, Agnes Ingleby, the daughter of Sir William Ingleby, by whom he had two sons, Sir Robert Constable (before 1495 – 12 October 1558), William Constable, a cleric, and a daughter, Everild. Sir Robert Constable (before 1495 – 12 October 1558) married, before 1530, Katherine Manners, the daughter of George Manners, 11th Baron de Ros of Helmsley, by Anne, only daughter and heiress of Sir Thomas St. Leger and Anne of York, by whom he had six sons, including his heir, Sir Marmaduke Constable (d. 1 February 1575), and a second son, Sir Robert Constable (d.1591), and five daughters. The second son, Sir Robert Constable (d.1591), married Christiana Dabridgecourt, widow of Anthony Forster, and daughter of John Dabridgecourt of Langdon Hall, Warwickshire. Their only child was the poet, Henry Constable.
- Sir William Constable of Hatfield in Holderness, knighted at Flodden.
- Sir John Constable (c.1491 – 1554x6) of Kinoulton, Nottinghamshire, who married, by February 1521, Jane Sothill, one of the twin daughters and co-heirs of Henry Sothill, esquire, of Stoke Faston, Leicestershire, and Joan Empson, daughter of Sir Richard Empson, by whom he had three daughters. He was knighted by the Earl of Hertford on 11 May 1544.
- Agnes Constable, who married firstly Sir Henry Ughtred, and secondly, Sir William Percy.
- Eleanor Constable (d.1525), who married firstly John Ingleby of Ripley, Yorkshire. She married secondly, Sir Thomas Berkeley, 5th Baron Berkeley (1472 – 22 January 1533), by whom she had two sons, Sir Thomas Berkeley, and Maurice Berkeley, esquire, and two daughters, Muriel, who married Sir Robert Throckmorton of Coughton Court, and Joan, who married Sir Nicholas Poyntz of Iron Acton, Gloucestershire.

Another noteworthy member of this family was the regicide, Sir William Constable (died 1655) who fought for Parliament in the English Civil War, and was a signatory to the death warrant of Charles I of England.

== Bibliography ==
- Baker, J. H. (2004). "Constable, Robert (late 1450s–1501)". Oxford Dictionary of National Biography (online ed.). Oxford University Press. doi:10.1093/ref:odnb/49669. (Subscription, Wikipedia Library access or UK public library membership required.)
- Bindoff, S. T. (1982). The House of Commons 1509-1558. Vol. I. London: Secker & Warburg. pp. 684–8.
- Brodie, Robert Henry (1887). "Constable, Marmaduke" . In Stephen, Leslie (ed.). Dictionary of National Biography. Vol. 11. London: Smith, Elder & Co. pp. 42–44.
- Clay, John William (1908). North Country Wills. Vol. CXVI. London: Bernard Quaritch. pp. 64–6.
- Raine, James; Clay, John William (1869). Testamenta eboracensia or wills registered at York. Vol. IV. Durham: Andrews & Co. p. 169.
- Horrox, Rosemary (2004). "Constable, Sir Marmaduke (1456/7?–1518)". Oxford Dictionary of National Biography (online ed.). Oxford University Press. doi:10.1093/ref:odnb/6108. (Subscription, Wikipedia Library access or UK public library membership required.)
- Newman, Christine M. (2004). "Constable, Sir Robert (1478?–1537)". Oxford Dictionary of National Biography (online ed.). Oxford University Press. doi:10.1093/ref:odnb/6110. (Subscription, Wikipedia Library access or UK public library membership required.)
- Richardson, Douglas (2011). Everingham, Kimball G. (ed.). Magna Carta Ancestry: A Study in Colonial and Medieval Families. Vol. I (2nd ed.). Salt Lake City. ISBN 978-1449966379.
- Sullivan, Ceri (2004). "Constable, Henry (1562–1613)". Oxford Dictionary of National Biography (online ed.). Oxford University Press. doi:10.1093/ref:odnb/6103. (Subscription, Wikipedia Library access or UK public library membership required.)
- Works related to Marmaduke Constable at Wikisource: Dictionary of National Biography, 1885-1900, Volume 12, pp. 42–4.

Attribution
