= Henry Constable =

English poet (1562–1613)

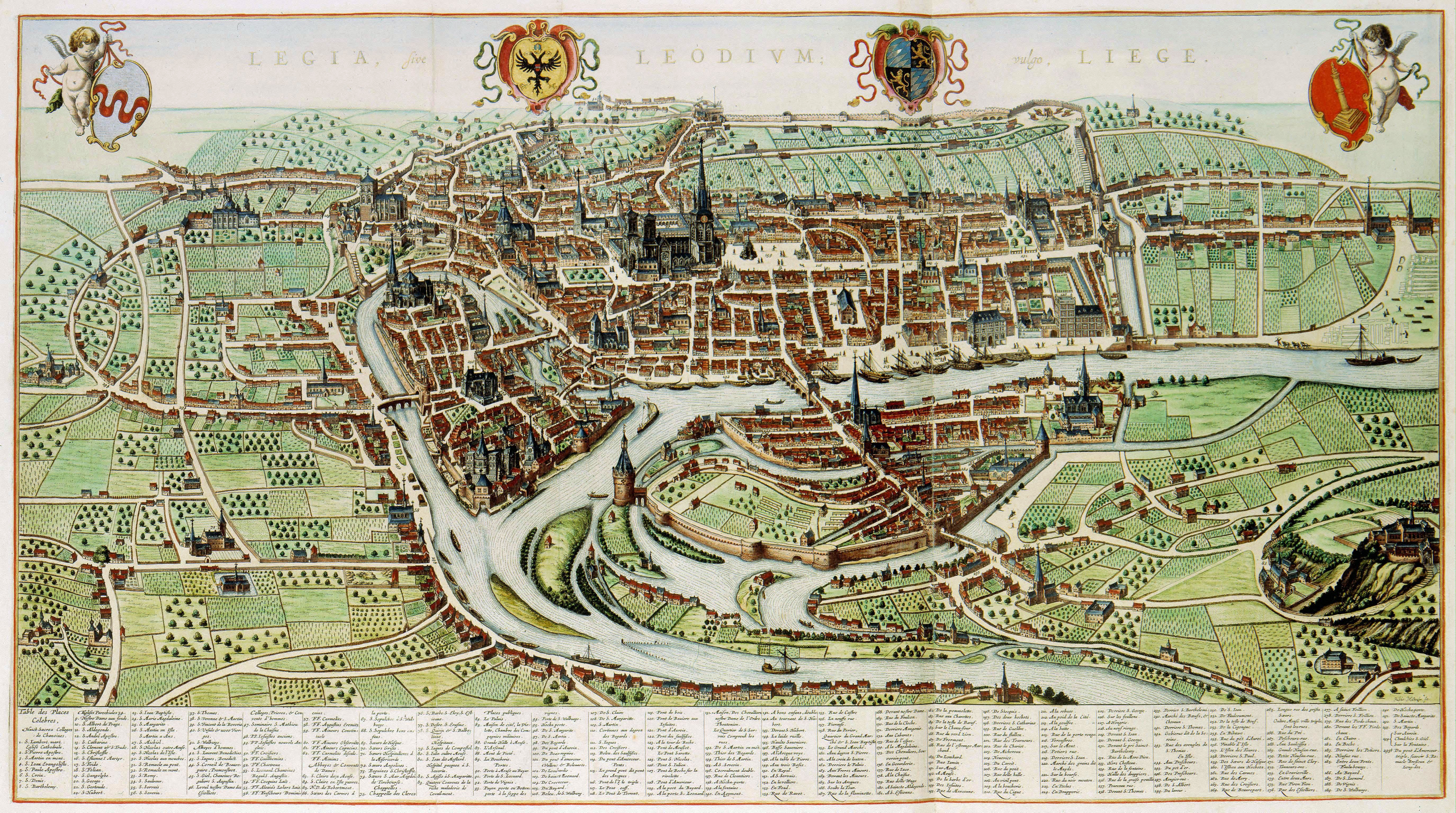
- Liège in 1649, a few decades after Constable's death there in 1613
- Born: 1562; Newark-on-Trent, Nottinghamshire, England
- Died: 9 October 1613 (aged 50–51); Liège, Prince-Bishopric of Liège, Holy Roman Empire
- Father: Sir Robert Constable
- Mother: Christiana Dabridgecourt

Henry Constable (1562 – 9 October 1613) was an English poet, known particularly for Diana, one of the first English sonnet sequences. In 1591 he converted to Catholicism, and lived in exile on the continent for some years. He returned to England at the accession of King James, but was soon a prisoner in the Tower and in the Fleet. He died an exile at Liège in 1613.

== Family ==
Henry Constable, born in Newark-on-Trent in 1562, was the only child of Sir Robert Constable and Christiana Dabridgecourt, widow of Anthony Forster, and daughter of John Dabridgecourt of Langdon Hall, Warwickshire. His paternal grandparents were Sir Robert Constable and Katherine Manners, the daughter of George Manners, 11th Baron de Ros, and sister of Thomas Manners, 1st Earl of Rutland. According to Sullivan, the connections Robert Constable acquired through his marriage 'opened up a career of military service and public office'. Constable served under Thomas Radclyffe, 3rd Earl of Sussex, in the campaign after the Northern Rebellion of 1569, and was knighted by Sussex at Berwick. He was Marshal of Berwick from 1576 to 1578, and was appointed Lieutenant-General of the Ordnance at some time before 4 August 1588. In the same year he had a son who was also named Henry, who became a Royalist army officer and the 1st Viscount Dunbar. Other children included daughter, Dorothy Lawson, who became a priest harbourer.

== Career ==
Henry Constable matriculated as a fellow commoner at St John's College, Cambridge at Easter 1578, and took his BA on 29 January 1580. His contemporary at Cambridge was Robert Devereux, 2nd Earl of Essex. He was enrolled at Lincoln's Inn on 21 February 1583, but there is no further record of his legal studies. On 12 September of that year Constable was in Scotland. He was then posted to Paris on the recommendation of his father's friend, Sir Francis Walsingham, serving under the English ambassador there, Sir Edward Stafford, between 14 December 1583 and April 1585. In May 1585 he was at Heidelberg, and he may have travelled to Poland. During this period, according to Sullivan, Constable acted as a spokesperson for Protestant causes.

Constable was probably at the English court during 1588–9, as he is recorded as having attended the funeral of his kinsman, John Manners, 4th Earl of Rutland, in March 1588, and as having been in contact with Arabella Stuart in 1589. During this period he was reported to have been one of Queen Elizabeth's favourites.

He was sent to Edinburgh in 1589 on the occasion of King James VI's marriage, and by this time was a member of the circle of Robert Devereux, 2nd Earl of Essex. His religious convictions were still to outward appearances Protestant. About this time he is credited with having written the anonymous tract Examen pacifique de la doctrine des Huguenots, published in September 1589, in which, according to Sullivan, he wrote as a Roman Catholic urging his countrymen to support Henri IV, who had just been crowned King. Constable seems to have left Scotland with the French diplomat Jean Hotman in October 1589, but returned in 1590, and wrote a sonnet, "To the King of Scotland upon the occasion of his longe stay in Denmarke by reason of the coldnesse of the winter and the freezing of the sea."

In 1591 Constable went to Normandy with the English forces under Essex who laid siege to Rouen. At some time between his arrival in France and the death of his father on 12 November 1591 Constable openly embraced Roman Catholicism. Henri IV granted him a small pension. For the next decade he was principally based in Paris, but travelled to Rome in 1595. On 3 October 1596 he was in Rouen, from which Gilbert Talbot, 7th Earl of Shrewsbury, wrote to Sir Robert Cecil that 'Here is Mr. H. Constable; who, lest he should have intruded himself into my company, I desired Mr Edmunds to let him know my desire he should forbear either coming, writing, or sending unto me, which he hath hitherto performed'. During this period he was also in Antwerp and Brussels. Until 1597 he kept up his connections with the Essex circle, writing to Essex himself and to Anthony Bacon. He continued to claim loyalty to Queen Elizabeth, and supported King James' claim to the English throne in preference to the claim of the Spanish Infanta, daughter of Philip II of Spain. On 1 March 1599 Constable arrived at Leith in Scotland, and eventually obtained access to King James, remaining until September, 'hunting and conversing on poetry and divinity' with the King. In 1600 he again travelled to Rome to seek Pope Clement VIII's approval of another visit to King James.

On James's accession Constable hoped to return to England, and wrote first to friends in Scotland for support, and on 11 June 1603, to his kinsman, Roger Manners, 5th Earl of Rutland, and to Sir Robert Cecil. By December of that year he was back at court, and was granted a warrant on 8 February 1604 by which he obtained possession of his inherited lands. However his continued pursuit of plans to influence King James towards toleration of Catholics resulted in his imprisonment in the Tower, where he remained from 14 April to 9 July 1604. The Venetian ambassador Nicolò Molin heard that Constable had written letters to the Papal nuncio or envoy in Paris, which were intercepted, leading to his arrest.

Constable was subsequently placed under house arrest, and deprived of his inheritance. He was in the Fleet prison on 11 February 1608, when John Chamberlain wrote to Sir Dudley Carleton that no sooner was Sir Tobie Matthew released, and 'no sooner gan nor his nest scant cold, when Harry Constable was committed in his roome and nestles in the same lodging'. Constable was imprisoned on at least one other occasion. On 31 July 1610 he was granted licence to leave England. He returned to Paris, and on 27 November 1611 rumours of his death were passed on by John Chamberlain to Sir Dudley Carleton: 'Sir William Bowes is lately dead, and we hear that Harry Constable hath taken the same way in Fraunce'. Little more is known of his activities apart from the record of his presence at a theological disputation on 4 September 1612. In 1613 his friend, Cardinal Perron, sent him to Liège on a mission to convert an English Protestant divine, Benjamin Carier. Constable died at Liège on 9 October 1613.

== Literary accomplishments ==
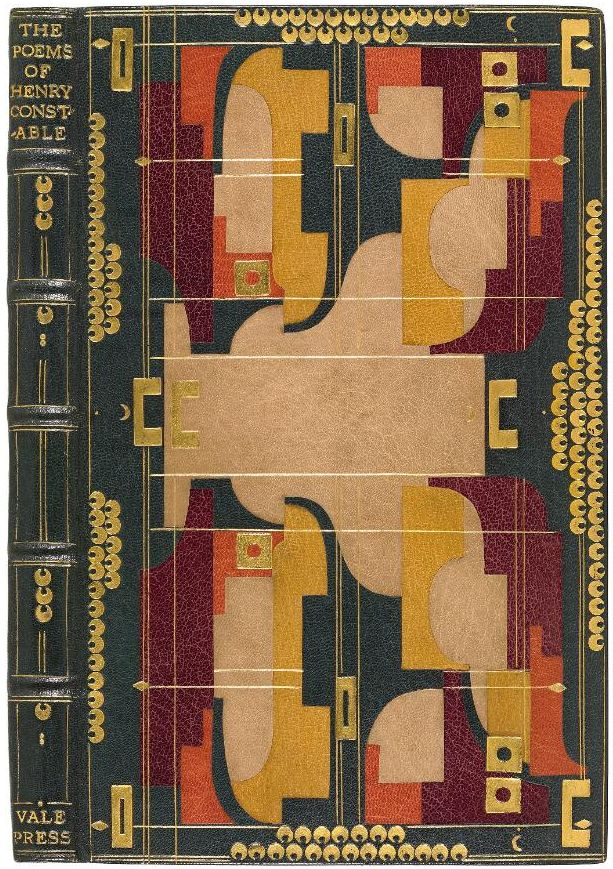
An 1897 edition of The Poems of Henry Constable in Art Deco binding

In 1592 Diana, a sequence of twenty-three sonnets by Constable, was published in London by Richard Smith, one of the first sonnets sequences in English. A second edition, containing five new sonnets by Constable with additions by Sir Philip Sidney and other poets followed in 1594. Sullivan considers that the 1594 publication was undertaken on Richard Smith's initiative. There were two further editions in 1597 and 1604. Four poems by Constable were included in England's Helicon in 1600, among them Damelus Song to his Diaphenia and Venus and Adonis. According to W. Carew Hazlitt, 'A more beautiful specimen of early English lyric poetry than The Sheepheard's Song of Venus and Adonis could hardly be found in the whole circle of Elizabethan poetry'.

The Todd manuscript contains additional love sonnets by Constable, and Harleian MS 7553 contains seventeen 'Spirituall sonnettes, to the honour of God: and hys saintes'.

Constable's verse is characterised by fervour and richness of colour. Of the numerous sonnets he wrote, the twenty-eight of the sonnet sequence Diana, and the four prefixed to Sir Philip Sidney's An Apology for Poetry, contain his best work. In My lady's presence makes the roses red, he is able to capture Spenser's charm. His rhyme scheme is mixed Italian and English, like Sidney's, the octave being Italian and the sestet English.

Constable was highly reputed as a poet in his day. In the censure of contemporary poets in Act I, Scene ii, of the anonymous Elizabethan play, The Return From Parnassus, Iudicio passes judgment favourably on Constable, saying that:

Sweete Constable doth take the wondring eare
And layes it up in willing prisonment.

Ben Jonson also pays tribute to Constable's verse in Underwood:

Hath our great Sydney Stella set,

Where never star shone brighter yet?
Or Constable's ambrosiac muse

Made Diana not his notes refuse

Constable is known to have written two theological tracts in 1596 and 1597 which are no longer extant. He also responded to A Conference about the Next Succession, generally attributed to Robert Persons. Constable's Discoverye of a Counterfecte Conference … for Thadvancement of a Counterfecte Tytle, which supported King James' claim to the English crown, was printed in Paris in 1600, although the title page falsely claimed that it had been printed in Cologne.
