= Robert Constable =

English nobleman

Sir Robert Constable (c. 1478 – 6 July 1537) was a member of the English Tudor gentry. He helped Henry VII to defeat the Cornish rebels at the Battle of Blackheath in 1497. In 1536, when the rising known as the Pilgrimage of Grace broke out in the north of England, Constable was one of the insurgent leaders, but towards the close of the year, he submitted at Doncaster and was pardoned. He did not share in the renewal of the rising, Bigod's rebellion, which took place in January 1537; but he refused the king's invitation to proceed to London, and was arrested, tried for treason, and hanged at Hull in the following June.

== Family ==
Born in Flamborough, Yorkshire, Robert Constable was the eldest son of Sir Marmaduke Constable (1456/7 – 20 November 1518) and his second wife, Joyce Stafford. His paternal grandparents were Sir Robert Constable of Flamborough, Yorkshire, and Agnes Wentworth, daughter of Sir Roger Wentworth, esquire, of Nettlestead, Suffolk, and Margery le Despencer. Constable's maternal uncle, Sir Humphrey Stafford (c. 1426/7 – 8 July 1486), was executed at Tyburn for his part in an insurrection against King Henry VII.

== Early life ==
In his youth Constable carried off a ward of Chancery, and tried to marry her to one of his retainers.

In the reign of Henry VII, he was of signal service to the crown upon the Cornish Rebellion led by Lord Audley, who marched on London and was defeated at the battle of Blackheath in 1497. Constable was one of the knights bannerets that were created at Blackheath by Henry VII after his victory on 17 June 1497.

In the following reign, he was also at the battle of Flodden in 1513, and he attended the Field of the Cloth of Gold in 1520.

In about 1526 Robert Constable of Flamborough visited Yedingham Priory where one of the nuns, Elizabeth Lutton was having a child. After she was taken back into the community Constable encouraged Thomas Scaseby to elope with Elizabeth Lutton in 1531. Scaseby may have been the father of the child and he married Lutton. Constable's motives for getting involved was that Elizabeth was a potential heiress and the marriage was to Constable's advantage in his own territorial disputes.

== Pilgrimage of Grace ==
In 1536, on the outbreak of the great Yorkshire rising, known as the Pilgrimage of Grace, caused by the beginning of the destruction of monasteries in 1536, he took the leading part, along with Robert Aske and Lord Darcy. Constable was among those who made their submission, and received their pardon. At the beginning of the next year, January 1537, when Sir Francis Bigod rashly attempted to renew the insurrection, Constable exerted himself to keep the country quiet. When this last commotion was over, he, like the other leaders, was invited by King Henry VIII to proceed to London. This he refused, and at the same time removed for safety from his usual place of abode to a dwelling thirty miles away.

Hereupon the powerful minister Thomas Cromwell caused the Duke of Norfolk to send him up with a sergeant-at-arms on 8 March. He with Aske and Darcy was committed to the Tower till they should be tried, and meantime Norfolk was directed to say in the north that they were imprisoned, not for their former offences, but for treasons committed since their pardon. What those treasons were the Duke was conveniently forbidden to say. There was 'no speciality to be touched or spoken of', but all 'conveyed in a mass together'. True bills were returned against them, and after their condemnation, it seemed to the King 'not amiss' that some of them should be remitted to their county for execution, 'as well for example as to see who would groan'. Constable and Aske were therefore sent down to Yorkshire, and exhibited as traitors in the towns through which they passed.

Constable was executed at Hull on 6 July 1537 being hanged in chains over Beverley gate at Hull, and thereby forfeited Flamborough and 35 other manors in Lincolnshire. The Duke of Norfolk witnessed his execution;

On Frydaye, beyng market daye at Hull, Sir Robert Constable suffred, and dothe hang above the highest gate of the towne, so trymmed in cheynes, that I thinke his bones will hang there this hundrethe yere. And on Thursdaye, which shall be market daye, God willing, I will be at the execution of Aske at York.

— Duke of Norfolk,

== Issue ==
Sir Robert was married to Jane Ingleby of Ripley (b. 1472) in 1492, probably in Yorkshire, England. Jane's parents were Sir William Ingleby of Ripley, son of John Ingleby of Ripley and Margaret Strangeways, Baroness Willoughby, and his wife Catherine Stillington, daughter of Thomas Stillington of Nether Acaster and Agnes Bigod.

Sir Robert and Jane had the following issue:

- Sir Marmaduke Constable of Nuneaton (1498/1502 – 20 April 1560), married Elizabeth Darcy, daughter of Lord Darcy. Had issue.
- Catherine Constable (c. 1498–1585), married Sir Roger Cholmeley of Roxby (d. 1538). Had issue.
- Thomas Constable of Great Grimsby (c. 1504 – aft. 1558), MP, married 1st Barbara Catherall, and secondly a daughter of Robert Haldenby of Haldenby. He had issue by both wives.
- Joyce Constable (b. circa 1500), married Rowland Pudsey. No issue.
- Anne Constable (b. circa 1504), who married George Hussey (d. 10 August 1537) of Harswell and North Duffield, Yorkshire, son and heir of Sir William Hussey (d. 1531) by Anne Salvaine, and had issue three sons, John, Robert and William, and one daughter, Frances.
- Jane Constable, married Thomas Rokeby of Mortham, and had issue, including Christopher Rokeby and the judge Ralph Rokeby.

== In fiction ==
He is a major character in The Man on a Donkey by H. F. M. Prescott.

== Ancestry ==
Ancestors of Robert Constable

16. Sir Marmaduke Constable of Flamborough(c.1379 – 5 August 1404)
8. Sir Robert Constable of Flamborough (c.1396 – 1441)
17. Katherine Cumberworth
4. Sir Robert Constable M.P. of Flamborough (Easter Day 1423 – 23 May 1488)
18. Sir William Gascoigne of Gawthorp (c.1362 – 1419)
9. Agnes Gascoigne (d.1466)
19. Elizabeth Mowbray (c.1340 – c.1391)
2. Sir Marmaduke Constable ("the Little") of Flamborough (c.1457 – 1518)
20. John Wentworth (- c.1319)
10. Sir Roger Wentworth of Nettlestead, Suffolkshire (d.1452)
21. Agnes Dornsfield
5. Agnes Wentworth (d.1496)
22. Philip Despenser, 1st Lord Despenser (c.1365 – 20 June 1424)
11. Margaret Despencer (d.1478)
23. Elizabeth Tibetot (1370 -)
1. Sir Robert Constable of Flamborough (c.1478 – 1537)
24. Ralph Stafford (1355 – 1 March 1410)
12. Sir Humphrey Stafford (d.1420)
25. Maud Hastang (b.2 Feb 1359)
6. Sir Humphrey Stafford of Grafton, Hertfordshire (1400 – 7 June 1450)
26. Sir John Burdet (c.1347 – c.1403)
13. Elizabeth Burdett (d.1434)
27. Katherine Aderne
3. Joyce Stafford (d.1500)
28. Sir John Aylesbury (6 May 1334 – 7 December 1409)
14. Thomas Aylesbury (c.1369 – 9 September 1418)
29. Isabel Strange
7. Eleanor Aylesbury (c.1406 -)
30. Laurence Pabenham (c.1334 – 10 June 1399)
15. Catherine Pabenham (c.1372 – 17 June 1436)
31. Elizabeth d' Engaine (1341 – 23 September 1377)
