= Cecily Tufton Manners, Countess of Rutland =

English aristocrat

Cecily Manners, Countess of Rutland (née Tufton; died 1653) was an English aristocrat.

== Career ==
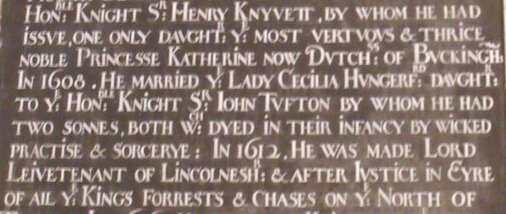
The marriages of Francis Manners, 6th Earl of Rutland, the family tragedy, and the marriage of his daughter Katherine Manners to the Duke of Buckingham are described on his tomb at St Mary the Virgin's Church, Bottesford

She was a daughter of Sir John Tufton and Catherine Browne.

She first married Sir Edward Hungerford. He died in 1607. In 1608, she married Francis Manners, who became the 6th Earl of Rutland in 1612. His first wife, Frances Knyvet, had died in 1605. Letters of a family business agent Thomas Screven to Roger Manners, 5th Earl of Rutland describe their meeting, betrothal, and marriage negotiations in London. Screven wrote, "this wooing of Sir Francis Manners goeth exceedingly well forward, and he applies it like a good wooer".

== Family tragedy ==
In 1615 the Countess of Rutland consulted the physician and astrologer Richard Napier, and in December 1616, Henry Atkins, about the health of her second son, Francis, the "little lord", the Baron de Ros or Roos. Cecily and her family were said to have been the target of witchcraft at Belvoir Castle. The death of her two children was blamed on the Flower family, Joan Flower and her daughters Margaret and Philippa, servants at the castle, were tried as witches at Lincoln. They confessed to making a charm to prevent the countess having any more children using a glove. Margaret and Philippa Flower were hanged in Lincoln Castle on 11 March 1619.

Some details of the accusations, the confessions, and the apparent sufferings of the Earl and Countess were printed in a pamphlet, The Wonderful Discovery of the Witchcrafts of Margaret and Philippa Flower, daughters of Joan Flower, Near Belvoir Castle. The pamphlet claims that some misdemeanour of the Flower family was reported to Cecily, Countess of Rutland, and various ill effects ensued. It was said that Margaret Flower and her mother purloined groceries from the castle. Joan Willimot, one of the accused, mentioned that one of the Flower sisters was "put away" from her service at the castle. The story was developed into a ballad published in 1619, titled Damnable Practises of three Lincolne-shire Witches, set to the tune "Ladies Fall". The ballad tells much the same story as the pamphlet.

== The Gypsies Metamorphosed ==
In Ben Jonson's masque The Gypsies Metamorphosed, performed at Burley-on-the-Hill, Belvoir, and Windsor Castle in August and September 1621, an actor recited her "fortune". Six relatives of the Duke of Buckingham had their fortunes told.

Both your bravery and bounty
Style you mistress of the county.

== Later life ==
The Countess was said to have Catholic sympathies. She joined the household of Henrietta Maria in August 1626, and was permitted to attend mass with the queen.

She died in September 1653 and was buried at Westminster Abbey.

== Cecily, Countess of Rutland, and the portrait with a mantle ==
A portrait of Cecily Tufton is held by Colchester and Ipswich Museums Service.

A full-length portrait at Belvoir attributed Marcus Gheeraerts the Younger, or the workshop associated with William Larkin, was thought to be a portrait of Frances, Lady Manners, and was inscribed with her name. Another version of this portrait (with some differences in the costume and mantle) was formerly in the collection of the Nelson-Atkins Museum of Art. This three-quarter-length version (and the portrait at Belvoir) are now thought to depict this Cecily Tufton Manners, another sitter of the same family, who became Countess of Rutland in 1612. Her left hand is tucked into a distinctive "geranium-red" Irish style mantle.
