= Rutterkin =

Rutterkin may refer to:

- Rutterkin, the supposed familiar of Joan Flower, one of the Witches of Belvoir
- Rutterkin (Dungeons & Dragons), a demon in the Dungeons & Dragons role-playing game
- "Rutterkin", an episode of Robin of Sherwood
- Rutterkin, punk rock band from St. Petersburg, Florida
