= John Manners, 4th Earl of Rutland =

English Earl (1559–1588)

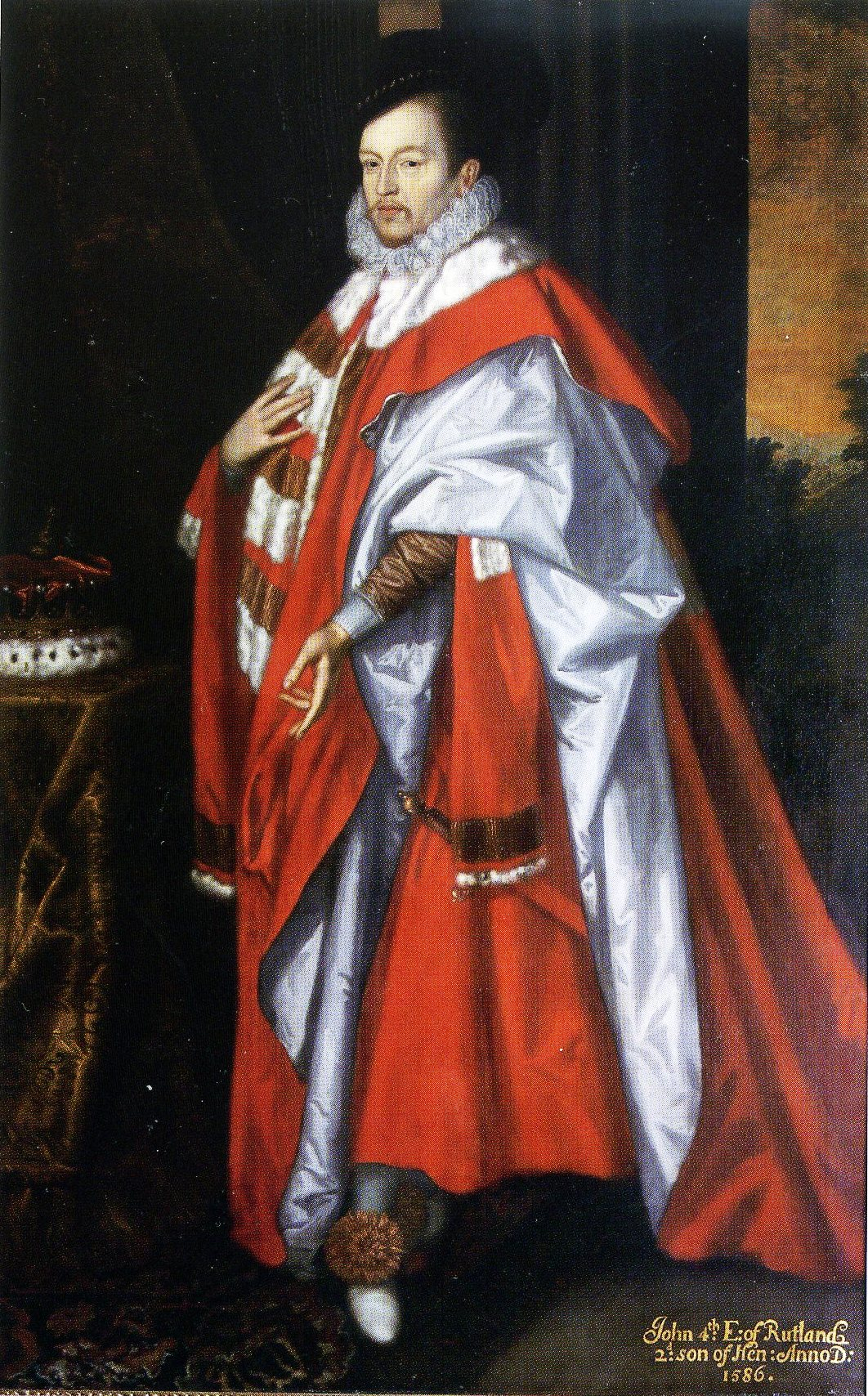
John Manners, 4th Earl of Rutland, mid-1670s, by Jeremiah van der Eyden, Belvoir Castle

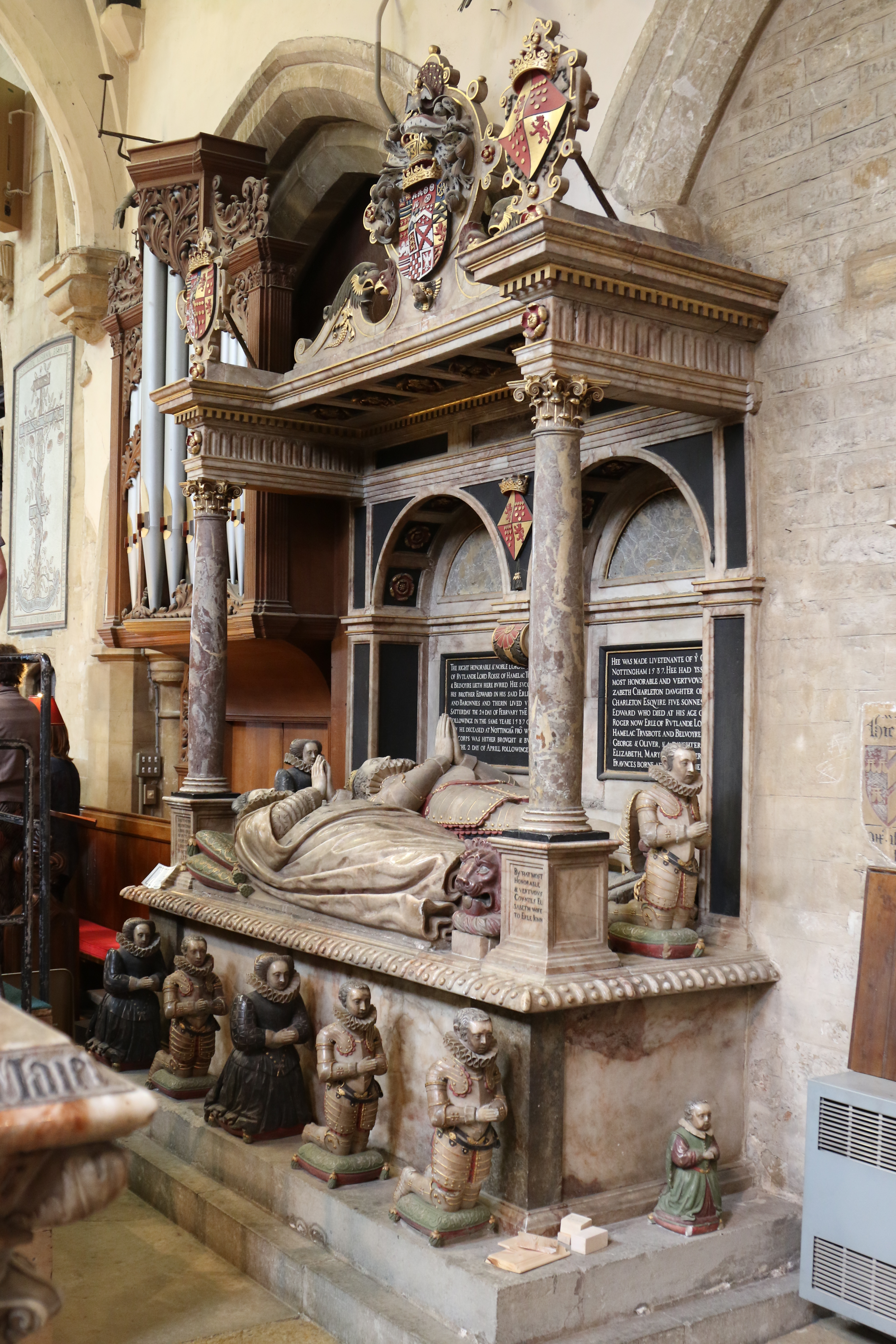
Monument to John Manners, 4th Earl of Rutland, St Mary's Church, Bottesford in Leicestershire

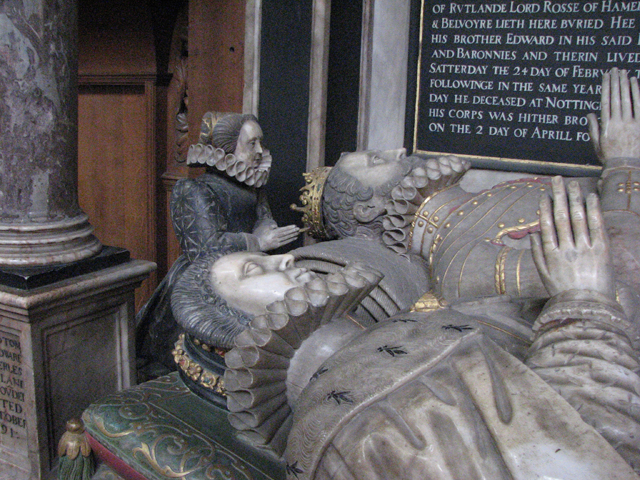
Detail of monument by Gerard Johnson the elder in St Mary's, Bottesford

John Manners, 4th Earl of Rutland (c. 1559 – 24 February 1588) was the son of Henry Manners, 2nd Earl of Rutland, and Lady Margaret Neville, daughter of Ralph Neville, 4th Earl of Westmorland.

== Marriage and children ==
He married Elizabeth Charlton, a daughter of Francis Charlton of Apley Castle, by whom he had ten children:

- Lady Bridget Manners (21 Feb 1572 – 10 July 1604) married Robert Tyrwhitt of Kettleby 1594
- Roger Manners, 5th Earl of Rutland (6 October 1576 – 26 June 1612) married Elizabeth Sidney.
- Francis Manners, 6th Earl of Rutland (1578 – 17 December 1632) married twice, first to Frances Knyvet, and secondly to Cecily Tufton.
- George Manners, 7th Earl of Rutland (1580 – 29 March 1641) married Frances Cary.
- Sir Oliver Manners (c. 1582 – 1613)
- Lady Frances Manners (22 October 1588 – 1643) married William Willoughby, 3rd Baron Willoughby of Parham
- Lady Mary Manners
- Lady Elizabeth Manners (died 16 March 1653)
- Edward Manners died young
- Lady Anne Manners; married Sir George Wharton

Political offices
Preceded by The Earl of Rutland	Lord Lieutenant of Nottinghamshire; 1587–1588	Succeeded by The Earl of Shrewsbury
Preceded by The Earl of Rutland	Custos Rotulorum of Nottinghamshire; 1587–1588	Succeeded by Sir Thomas Stanhope
Peerage of England
Preceded by Edward Manners	Earl of Rutland; 1587–1588	Succeeded by Roger Manners
