= The Gypsies Metamorphosed =

Play

The Gypsies Metamorphosed, alternatively titled The Metamorphosed Gypsies, The Gypsies' Metamorphosis, or The Masque of Gypsies, was a Jacobean era masque written by Ben Jonson, with music composed by Nicholas Lanier. It was first performed on 3 August 1621, and was the biggest popular hit of Jonson's masquing career.

== Buckingham ==
The masque was sponsored (and paid for) by George Villiers, 1st Duke of Buckingham – at that time the Marquis of Buckingham – the court favorite of King James I. Buckingham was celebrating his 6 May marriage to Lady Katherine Manners, the daughter of the Earl of Rutland, and the wedding of Spencer Compton and Mary Beaumont. The masque was performed around the seven year anniversary of Buckingham meeting King James.

The original 3 August 1621 performance occurred at Burley House in Rutland, Buckingham's country house. It was repeated on 5 August, at Belvoir Castle in Lincolnshire, the country seat of Buckingham's father-in-law the Earl of Rutland, with additional lines celebrating the anniversary of the rescue of King James at Gowrie House in Perth. It was staged a third time at Windsor Castle in September.

== The show ==
The masque was a bold and fresh departure from what was normal for the masque form, in that it featured none of the classical gods and goddesses, the mythological figures, or the personifications of abstract qualities that were standard in masques. Instead, the characters are, as the title indicates, gypsies, who behave for the most part in stereotypical gypsy fashion: they sing and dance frequently, they tell fortunes, and they pick the pockets of the common people who fall in among them. In the masque, the gypsies' "metamorphosis" is that their complexions change from "Ethiop" darkness to English white, under the beneficent royal influence of James. Thereupon the gypsies return all the stolen goods to their proper owners. The transformative make-up was provided by the court apothecary John Wolfgang Rumler, "made, and layd on by Master Wolf's appointment".

One of the masque's unusual features is that aristocrats not only danced in the masque, which was common, but took speaking roles too, which was not. Buckingham himself had a speaking part in which he addressed the King directly; his family and friends were also in the cast. Another unusual feature was the telling of fortunes for the aristocrats of the court. In the first version, fortunes were provided for noblewomen, including Katherine Manners, Lady Elizabeth Hatton, and the Countesses of Rutland, Exeter, and Buckingham (the latter being the favorite's mother); in a later revised version, prominent courtiers like the Earl of Pembroke and Frances, Countess of Exeter received their fortunes (which of course were always positive and complementary/complimentary).

== Costs ==
The free-spending Buckingham paid Jonson the unusual sum of £100 for his work on the masque, double the usual sum of 40-50 pounds; but Lanier was even more generously rewarded for his music, receiving £200. One of the masque's songs, which begins with the line "Cocklorrel would needs have the devil his guest," was a popular hit, both in its own time and well into the Restoration era. (A musical setting for the song survives, though it is anonymous and not certainly Lanier's; other song settings for the masque, by Robert Johnson and Edmund Chilmead, also exist, testifying to the work's popularity.)

== Texts ==
The masque was included in the second folio collection of Jonson's works in 1641; it also received a separate publication in 1640, in a duodecimo volume issued by John Okes. The work also exists in manuscript versions; one is an autograph manuscript, the only surviving MS. in Jonson's hand. The manuscripts have been helpful to scholars in repairing the deficiencies of the printed texts, which jumble together the original and revised versions of the masque.

== Critical responses ==
The Gypsies Metamorphosed was not only popular with its Jacobean audience; modern critics have tended to judge it affirmatively as well. At least one modern scholar has considered it "Jonson's finest achievement as a writer of masques." The masque's multiple levels of meaning have attracted a wide range of critical commentary.

== Sources ==
- Bancroft, Angus. Roma and Gypsy—Travellers in Europe: Modernity, Race, Space and Exclusion. London, Ashgate, 2005.
- Blank, Paula. Broken English: Dialects and the Politics of Language in Renaissance Writings. London, Routledge, 1996.
- Logan, Terence P., and Denzell S. Smith, eds. The New Intellectuals: A Survey and Bibliography of Recent Studies in English Renaissance Drama. Lincoln, NE, University of Nebraska Press, 1977.
- Netzloff, Mark. England's Internal Colonies: Class, Capital, and the Literature of Early Modern English Colonialism. London, Palgrave Macmillan, 2003.
- Skantze, P. A. Stillness in Motion in the Seventeenth-Century Theatre. London, Routledge, 2003.
- Walls, Peter. Music in the English Courtly Masque, 1604–1640. Oxford, Clarendon Press, 1996.
