= Célestin Demblon =

Belgian writer and politician

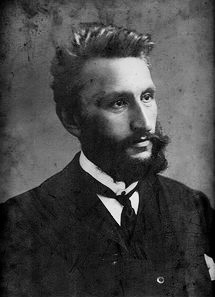
- Demblon as a young man
- Born: 19 May 1859; Neuville-en-Condroz, Neupré, Belgium
- Died: 13 December 1924 (aged 65); Brussels, Belgium
- Occupations: Writer; politician; teacher
- Years active: 1883–1924
- Notable work: Lord Rutland est Shakespeare; Contes mélancoliques

Célestin Demblon (19 May 1859 – 13 December 1924) was a Belgian socialist politician, teacher and writer, known for his anti-clerical views and his promotion of Francophone Walloon culture. He was also a creative writer in the Symbolist tradition and the author of books on a variety of topics, most notably the Shakespeare authorship question.

== Early life ==
From a working-class background, Demblon studied at the École normale of Liège. He was soon working as a teacher in the town but came into conflict with the educational authorities because of his uninhibited discussion of political issues with students. He was accused of promoting socialism to school children, and of attacking the king. He was dismissed from his post.

Demblon obtained work as a lecturer at the Université nouvelle in Brussels, which had been created in 1894 by left-wingers, including anarchists and socialists originally from the Université libre de Bruxelles (Free University of Brussels). It was an independent and self-managed educational institution.

== Politics ==
Demblon embarked on a political career in 1894, standing in the legislative elections of that year against the former Liberal prime minister Walthère Frère-Orban as a Socialist candidate. The young teacher defeated the former prime minister, taking his seat in the House of Representatives.

Demblon was noted for forthright views, in particular a strong anti-clericism. His distaste for the Catholic church was expressed in pamphlets with titles such as "La pornographie cléricale", which provoked a debate in the legislature about Demblon's claim that the Bible was full of pornographic passages. Demblon also promoted Walloon ethnic identity within Belgium, at one point insisting that a Walloon should be appointed to a job teaching design because "teaching given by a Walloon will be more profitable for the students ... the picturesque vision characteristic of the Walloon race is very different from that of the Flemish painters." His opposition to the "flamangistes" was linked to a belief in the importance of French cultural identity. He also opposed proponents of the Walloon dialect for the same reason. In 1887 he objected to official support for "patois", writing that "the powerful and lucid young people who have just appeared as if by magic in Wallonia will most certainly take their place enthusiastically before the great organ of the French language"

In 1896, during a major strike, Demblon created the Fédération liégeoise du Parti ouvrier belge (Liege Federation of the Belgian Workers Party), becoming its first member. The POB (Parti ouvrier belge), as it was known, was designed as an alliance of radical groups promoting a consensus socialist political vision. The syndicalist César De Paepe inspired the party vision, but Demblon became its principal spokesman.

During World War I, Demblon distanced himself from the nationalist wing of the Belgian left. Declaring his solidarity with international socialist values, he wrote, "Whoever is hungry has no country anywhere; the poor have no homeland, they have nothing to lose in this war because they have nothing." While Belgium was under German occupation, Demblon devoted himself to writing. He escaped to France in 1915, where he gave lectures, often with Ève Francis.

After the war he revived his role as a leader of the Fédération liégeoise, but soon fell out with other members of the leadership, as he showed increasing sympathy for Communism, in particular expressing support for the Russian Revolution. He wrote, "I am for the Russian revolution, which is a stronghold for the working class of the world. Without this fortress, without this revolution, the bourgeoisie would not make concessions on social security to the POB. 'Social security' has been thrown by the bourgeoisie at the head of the workers in panicked fear of Bolshevism in our country, as one throws a bone to a dangerous dog." He was expelled from the POB on a technicality (failure to promptly pay membership fees), as the leadership were unable to secure enough support for his removal from ordinary members. Demblon then became associated with the Communists, but died suddenly before coming to an agreement to stand in an election.

After his death from influenza in 1924, the Communists and the Liège Federation POB vied to identify themselves with his memory. The two factions constructed competing monuments to him in the Cimetière de Robermont.

== Writings ==
In addition to political polemics, Demblon wrote works on a variety of scholarly and topical subjects. He became known internationally for his writings on the Shakespeare authorship question, in which he promoted the claims of Roger Manners, 5th Earl of Rutland. These views were expounded in Lord Rutland est Shakespeare (1912) and L'Auteur d'Hamlet et son monde (1914). He also published French translations of several of Shakespeare's tragedies.

Demblon wrote creative literature influenced by the Symbolist movement. His collection of short stories Contes mélancoliques was published in 1883. He also published occasional poetry.

He wrote regularly for Albert Mockel's journal La Wallonie. His book La Guerre à Liège (1915) is an account of the effect of the early stages of World War I on the area. La Belgique à la France was about the relationship between French and Belgian identity.
