= Sir John Tufton, 1st Baronet =

English landowner

Sir John Tufton, 1st Baronet (died 1624) was an English landowner.

== Career and family ==
He was the son of John Tufton and Mary Baker, a daughter of Sir John Baker. His family home was at Hothfield in Kent.

He twice served as Sheriff of Kent, was knighted in 1603, and made a baronet in 1611.

His first wife was Olympia Blower, a daughter of Christopher Blower of Sileham and Bloor's Place, Rainham. Their children included:

- Anne Tufton, who married Francis Tresham, the Gunpowder Plot conspirator, in 1593
- Elizabeth Tufton
- Margaret Tufton, who married Thomas Caril of Shipley, Sussex

Tufton married, secondly, Christian Browne, daughter of Sir Humphrey Browne. His children with Christian Browne included:

- Nicholas Tufton, 1st Earl of Thanet (1578–1631), later Earl of Thanet, who married Frances Cecil
- Humfrey Tufton (1584–1659) of the Mote, Maidstone, who married Margaret Morley
- Richard Tufton (died 1631), of Tothill Street, Westminster, who married Chrysogon Morley, a sister of Margaret Morley
- William Tufton (died 1631 or in 1650), of Vinters, Boxley, and Governor of Barbados, who married Anne Cave (died 1649)
- Cecily Tufton (died 1653), who married (1) Sir Edward Hungerford, and (2), Francis Manners, 6th Earl of Rutland (died 1632). Her family at Belvoir Castle was thought to have been troubled by witchcraft.
- Anne Tufton, (died 1606).

He died in 1624. He and his first wife, Olympia, were buried at Hothfield, and reburied in the Tufton aisle at Rainham.

Baronetage of England
Preceded by New creation	Baronet (of Hothfield); 1611–1624	Succeeded by Nicholas Tufton
