= Roger Manners, 5th Earl of Rutland =

English magnate

The Earl of Rutland
- Earl of Rutland
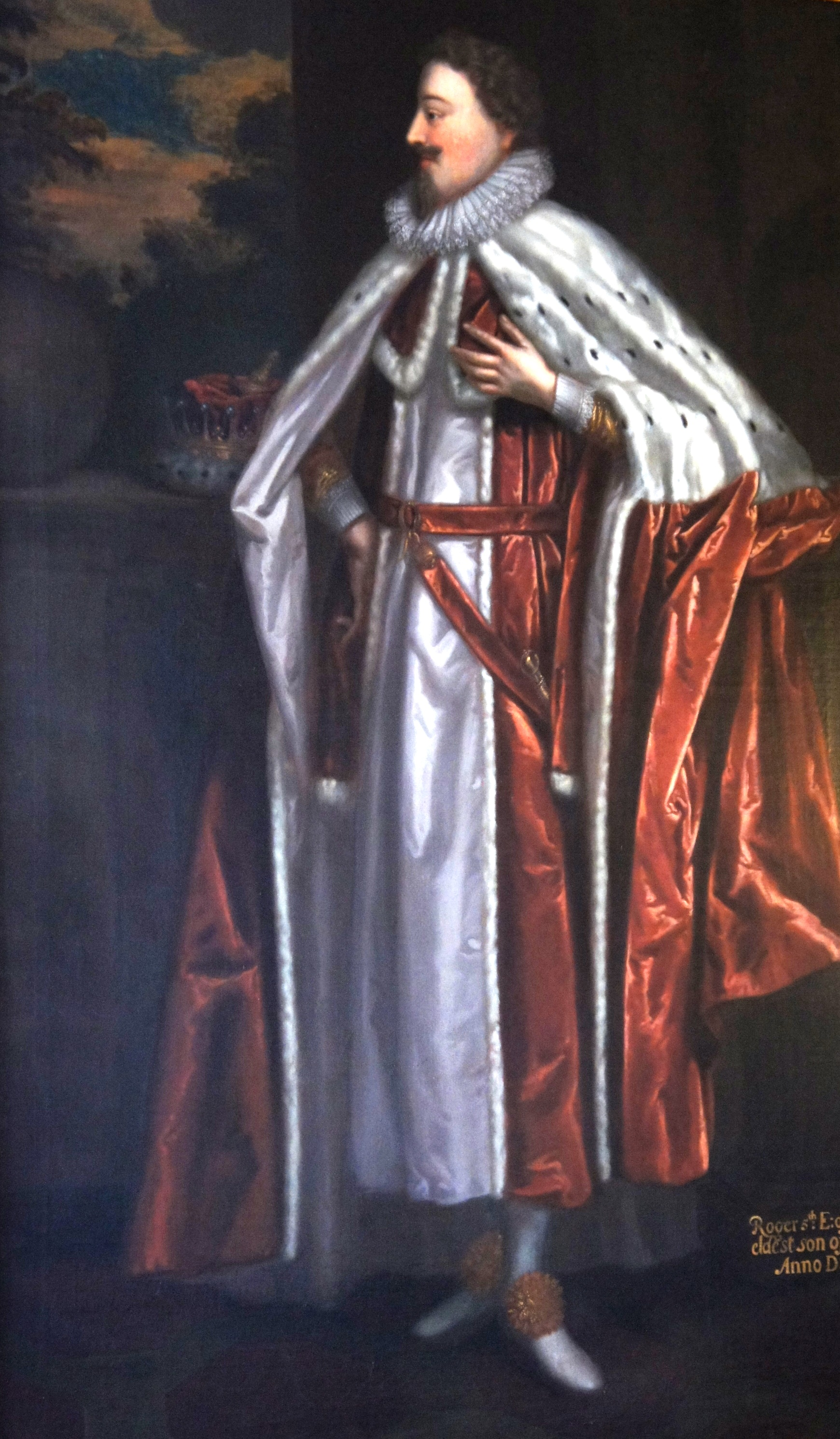
- Tenure: 1588 – 1612
- Other titles: Lord Ros
- Born: Roger Manners; 5 October 1576; Kirk Deighton
- Died: 26 June 1612 (aged 35)
- Buried: St Mary the Virgin's Church, Bottesford
- Spouse: Elizabeth Sidney
- Parents: John Manners, 4th Earl of Rutland; Elizabeth Charleton

Roger Manners, 5th Earl of Rutland (6 October 1576 – 26 June 1612) was the eldest surviving son of John Manners, 4th Earl of Rutland and his wife, Elizabeth née Charleton (d. 1595). He travelled across Europe, took part in military campaigns led by the Earl of Essex, and was a participant in Essex's rebellion against Queen Elizabeth I. He was favoured by James I, and honoured by his contemporaries as a man of great intelligence and talent. He enjoyed the friendship of some of the most prominent writers and artists of the Elizabethan and Jacobean eras. In 1603 he led an embassy to Denmark, homeland of James' Queen, Anne of Denmark.

Evidence indicates that Manners was a patron of the architect Inigo Jones and probably introduced Jones to the Court of James I and Anne of Denmark, where Jones had his impact both on Jacobean architecture and as a designer of Court masques.

== Life ==
He was born probably at Kirk Deighton, Yorkshire, where he was baptized on 19 November 1576.

Manners' uncle Edward Manners, 3rd Earl of Rutland had died 14 April 1587. He left the Earldom of Rutland and the Barony of Manners to his brother, John, but the Barony de Ros went to his only child, daughter Elizabeth. (Note: Rutland was styled Lord Ros before he attained the earldom. However the barony came into the Manners family through the female line and the provisions of the 3rd Earl's will. So it was disputed whether the barony descended through the heirs general or the male heir, and both sides claimed the title. After a long legal dispute, in 1616 it was decided that the Barony of Ros would descend through Elizabeth, the 3rd Earl of Rutland's daughter, as his only heir according to the instructions in his will.(Danushevskaya, 2001, n. 566, p. 205.)) The 4th Earl died less than a year later, on 24 February 1588, passing the title on to his son. This meant that Rutland's inheritance was complicated by the demands of two wills and jointures for two dowager countesses and disputes between them. Since he was only 11 when his father died, he became a royal ward of Queen Elizabeth. His wardship was originally promised to Robert Dudley, 1st Earl of Leicester, but Dudley died on 4 September 1588 and Sir William Cecil, Lord Burghley, the Queen's Secretary of State and chief advisor, became his guardian. His cousin, Elizabeth Manners, had been placed in Burghley's household after the death of her father.

From late 1587, Rutland was educated under the supervision of John Jegon at Queens' College, Cambridge and later at Corpus Christi College, Cambridge. He was at Cambridge when he received the news of his father's death, and he returned home for his father's funeral, and remained there until mid-May 1588, after Burghley insisted he return to Cambridge to continue his education. Rutland graduated as MA on 20 February 1595, in a grand ceremony planned and managed by Robert Devereux, 2nd Earl of Essex, the Queen's then-favourite and the late Dudley's stepson.

Rutland soon became a follower of Robert Devereux, 2nd Earl of Essex. This was to cause him serious problems when he became implicated in the Essex Rebellion of 1601. Rutland was imprisoned for several months and was fined the "staggering" amount of £30,000: three times more than any other conspirator. He was taken to the Tower of London but allowed to bring his own furnishings, including a suite of tapestry from the Great Chamber of Haddon Hall. In order to pay the debt he was forced to sell land, causing a major argument with his mother, who refused to accept the loss of family estates.

After the accession of James I, Rutland travelled north to meet the king at Worksop Manor. James then came to Belvoir, where masons and carpenters worked to ready the castle. Tents were hired to accommodate the king's followers.

The Earl was sent to Denmark with the Scottish usher James Maxwell to attend the christening of Christian, Prince-Elect of Denmark a son of Christian IV. A record of names at an event in Denmark includes Inigo Jones. Rutland gave £10 to "Henygo Jones", described as a "picture maker", in June 1604. He bought plants and grafted fruit trees for Belvoir from Sir Thomas Tresham.

The Earl's position improved somewhat, but remained difficult. His wife Elizabeth was humiliated in 1605 when a goldsmith had her arrested for debt.

== Marriage ==
He married Elizabeth Sidney (d. 1612), daughter of Sir Philip Sidney and stepdaughter of Robert Devereux, 2nd Earl of Essex, on 5 March 1599. She made arrangements to meet Anne of Denmark on her journey from Scotland in June 1603. She visited the spa at Bath for her health in June 1605.

Elizabeth, Countess of Rutland, paid Zachary Bethell a contribution towards the cost of the court masque Hymenaei in January 1606. She also contributed to the costs of her costume by buying items from Holmead, a silkman, and a "tire woman" who provided a coronet and a ruff.

The marriage was childless, and is widely believed to have been unhappy. It has been speculated that the marriage was not consummated, possibly because Rutland had syphilis, which may also have been the cause of Rutland's rapidly declining health in his last years.

== Death ==
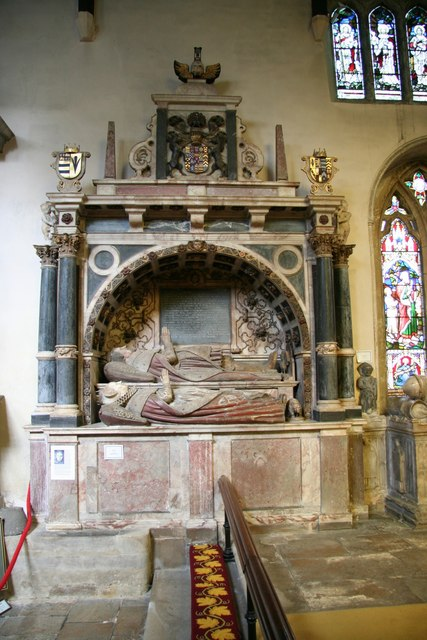
Tomb for Roger Manners, 5th Earl of Rutland and his wife Countess Elizabeth, daughter of Sir Philip Sidney in St. Mary's church

He died in 1612 at the age of 35, and his titles passed to his brother, Francis Manners. In 1618–19, Gerard Johnson the elder built a tomb in St Mary the Virgin's Church at Bottesford, Leicestershire commemorating the fifth earl and his wife. Rutland's mother had previously commissioned Johnson to erect two monuments commemorating the 3rd and 4th earls in 1591.

== Shakespeare authorship ==
In the early 20th century, Roger Manners was proposed as a candidate for the authorship of Shakespeare's literary work in the Shakespearean authorship question. His candidacy was first suggested by Burkhard Herrmann (using the pseudonym "Peter Alvor") in 1906, who argued that Rutland collaborated with the Earl of Southampton to create the works. Rutland wrote the comedies, the narrative poems and the sonnets. The theory was adopted by other writers, who dropped Southampton as a collaborator. It was most vigorously promoted by the German critic Karl Bleibtreu (1907), and later supported by a number of other authors, including Lewis Frederick Bostelmann (1909), the Belgian politician Célestin Demblon (1912) and the Russian writers Pyotr Sergeevich Porokhovshchikov (1940) and Ilya Gililov (2003).

== Notes ==
=== Citations ===
Peerage of England
Preceded by John Manners	Earl of Rutland; 1588–1612	Succeeded by Francis Manners
