= Frances Knyvet =

English courtier who performed in masques

Frances Knyvet or Knyvett (1583–1605) was an English courtier who performed in masques.

== Career ==
She was a daughter of Henry Knyvet (1537–1598) of Charlton Park, Wiltshire, and Elizabeth Stumpe (died 1585), the daughter of a wealthy clothier, James Stumpe, of Malmesbury.

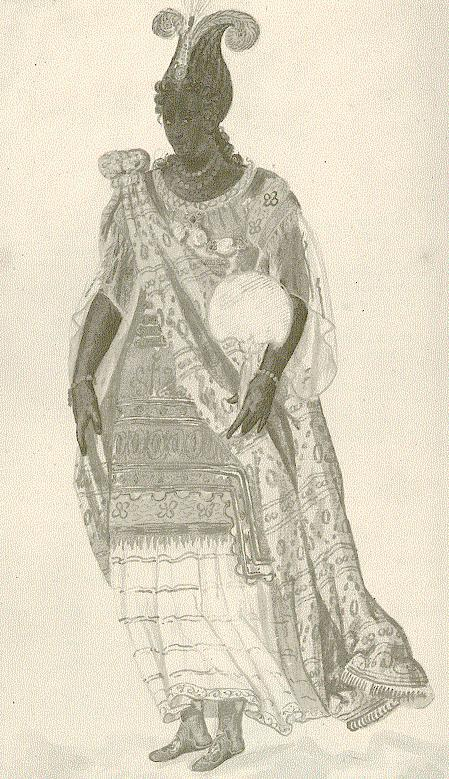
Costume design for The Masque of Blackness by Inigo Jones

Her first husband was Sir William Bevill (c. 1548 – 1600) of Killigarth near Polperro. While serving in Parliament in 1593 he was given leave to return home to attend his first wife's illness. She was Jane Arundell, a daughter of Thomas Arundell of Wardour. Bevill is said to have been gored to death by a bull on one of his farms. This story is probably derived from family heraldry featuring a carved bull at St Tallanus' Church, Talland.

In 1602, she married Francis Manners, later the 6th Earl of Rutland. The family home was Belvoir Castle. He was made a Knight of the Bath in January 1605.

She danced in masques at the court of Anne of Denmark. Named as "Lady Bevill", she appeared in The Masque of Blackness as Notis on 6 January 1605. Her sister, Catherine, Countess of Suffolk, portrayed Kathare. This masque, celebrating the creation of Prince Charles as Duke of York, is noted for the use of blackface makeup.

Her daughter, Katherine, married the royal favourite, George Villiers, 1st Duke of Buckingham in 1620.

Frances, Lady Manners, died of smallpox in the summer of 1605. She was buried at St Mary the Virgin, Bottesford, Leicestershire. Her husband became Earl of Rutland in 1612.

== Sources of confusion ==
Frances Knyvet is sometimes confused with another Frances, Lady Manners, and Countess of Rutland (born 1571). Frances Cary was the daughter of Edward Cary and Katherine Knyvett, and married George Manners, 7th Earl of Rutland in March 1605. Lady Anne Clifford wrote that this "Lady Manners" was a friend to her in London in 1616 and used to visit her and help dress her hair.

Some portraits thought to depict Frances, Lady Manners, are now believed to depict Cecily Tufton Manners, Countess of Rutland.
