= Killigarth Manor =

Manor house in Cornwall, England

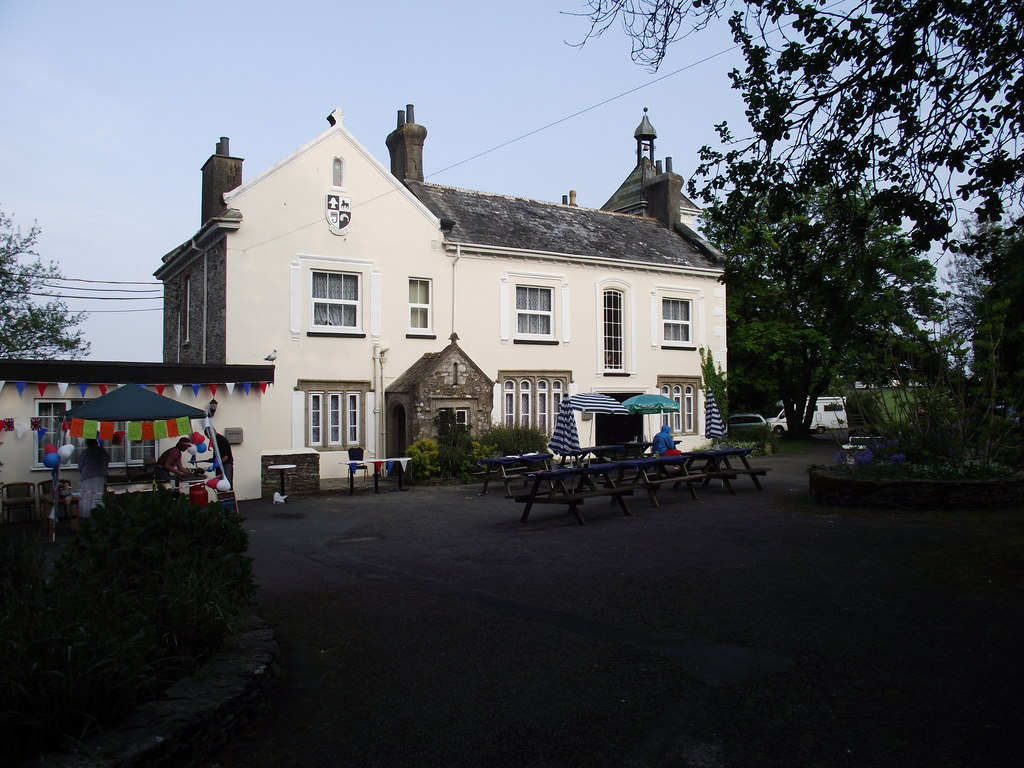

- Location within Cornwall
- 50.337806°N 4.509565°W
- Location: Claremont Falls Road, Killigarth, Polperro, Cornwall, England

History
- Built: 1872

Listed Building – Grade II
- Official name: Killigarth Manor
- Designated: 27 August 1952
- Reference no.: 1140790

Killigarth Manor is a Grade II listed former manor house in the civil parish of Polperro in Cornwall, United Kingdom. It is in the hamlet of Killigarth northeast of Polperro village. It has an 1872 datestone which marks the date when the older house was demolished, though its materials were used in the building of the present house. Killigarth Manor is used as holiday accommodation. In the grounds are a holiday and caravan park. The small housing estate of Carey Park is nearby.

== Manor house ==
An original manor house dates from 1662 and existed prior to the current one, and was described by Jonathan Couch in his History of Polperro (1871): "At the top of the eastern hill ... is the neat old manor-house of Killigarth, with its antique square-headed and granite-mullioned windows, its respectable arched doorways, and massive chimneys ... The house has on the second stage, a fine room, now used as a sleeping apartment; but, from its dimensions and the labour bestowed on its decoration, evidently once the state room of the house."

In 1872, the original house was demolished and a new house was built using the same stone, as shown by the building's date stone. It is also possible that part of the house was simply remodelled, rather than fully demolished as the 1662 date stone remains. There are also record of the original building having a bell tower. The building, made of granite rubble with a slate roof, is two stories high. The present building was designated Grade II listed status on 27 August 1952. Presently the grounds include a John Fowler Holiday Parks site, with some guests staying in the manor itself.

== Family history ==
Killigarth was probably owned by John de Kylgat, who is listed by Richard Carew as being among those who had estates of £20 a year in the reign of Edward I. In the reign of Henry VI it was in the possession of the Bere family from whom it passed through an heiress to the Beville family and was the seat of John Bevill, Sheriff of Cornwall in the sixteenth century. Sir William Beville and his wife Frances Knyvet lived here in the reign of Queen Elizabeth I. He was the last male heir of his family who is said to have died after being gored by a bull.

By 1714, the manor was owned by Revd Nicholas Kendall, the arch-deacon of Totnes.
