= Nicholas Tufton, 1st Earl of Thanet =

English peer (1578–1631)

- Born: 1578
- Died: 1631 (aged 52–53)
- Noble family: Tufton
- Spouse: Frances Cecil
- Issue: John Tufton, 2nd Earl of Thanet
- Father: Sir John Tufton, 1st Baronet
- Mother: Christian Browne

Nicholas Tufton, 1st Earl of Thanet (1578–1631) was an English peer.

Nicholas Tufton was the son of Sir John Tufton, and Christian Browne, the daughter of Sir Humphrey Browne, Justice of the Common Pleas, by Agnes Hussey, the daughter of John Hussey, 1st Baron Hussey of Sleaford, by his second wife, Anne Grey.

Tufton represented Peterborough in 1601, presumably through the influence of his father-in-law Thomas Cecil, 1st Earl of Exeter. Traveling north to welcome the new king to England, he was knighted by James I at Newcastle on 13 April 1603. He was then a justice of the peace in Kent and by 1611 a deputy lieutenant. He became a member of the Virginia Company of London in 1610. In 1624 he represented Kent as the senior Knight of the shire. He succeeded his father in the baronetcy in 1625 and was created Baron Tufton, of Tufton on 1 November 1626. For the latter honour he paid £15,000 to the Exchequer and possibly a further £5,000 to George Villiers, 1st Duke of Buckingham. He was created Earl of the Isle of Thanet on 5 August 1628.

He owned Bodiam Castle, having purchased it in 1623.

He died in at Sapcote, Leicestershire on 1 July 1631 and was buried at his request at Rainham, Kent.

== Family ==
He married Frances Cecil (d. 1653), daughter of Thomas Cecil, 1st Earl of Exeter. They had 4 sons and 8 daughters, including:

- John Tufton, 2nd Earl of Thanet
- Cecil (d. 1682) of Lincoln's Inn Fields married Mary Lloyd (d. 1684)
- Elizabeth married Sir Edward Dering, 1st Baronet
- Cicely (d. 1635) for whom her father's will provided a dowry of £3,000.
- Mary married Sir Edward Bishopp, 2nd Baronet
- Christian married William Milward of Chilcote, Derbyshire
- Diana married Sir Robert Curzon of Waterperry, Oxfordshire, son of Sir John Curzon, 1st Baronet

Coat of arms of Nicholas Tufton, 1st Earl of Thanet
Coronet A Coronet of an Earl Crest A Sea Lion sejant Argent. Escutcheon Sable an Eagle displayed Ermine within a Bordure Argent. Supporters On either side an Eagle Ermine. Motto Ales Volat Propriis (The bird flies to its own)

== Notes ==
Peerage of England
New creation	Earl of Thanet; 1628–1631	Succeeded by John Tufton
New creation	Baron Tufton; 1626–1631	Succeeded by John Tufton
Baronetage of England
Preceded by John Tufton	Baronet (of Hothfield); 1625–1631	Succeeded by John Tufton
