= Henry Manners, 2nd Earl of Rutland =

English earl (1526–1563)

Henry Manners
- 2nd Earl of Rutland
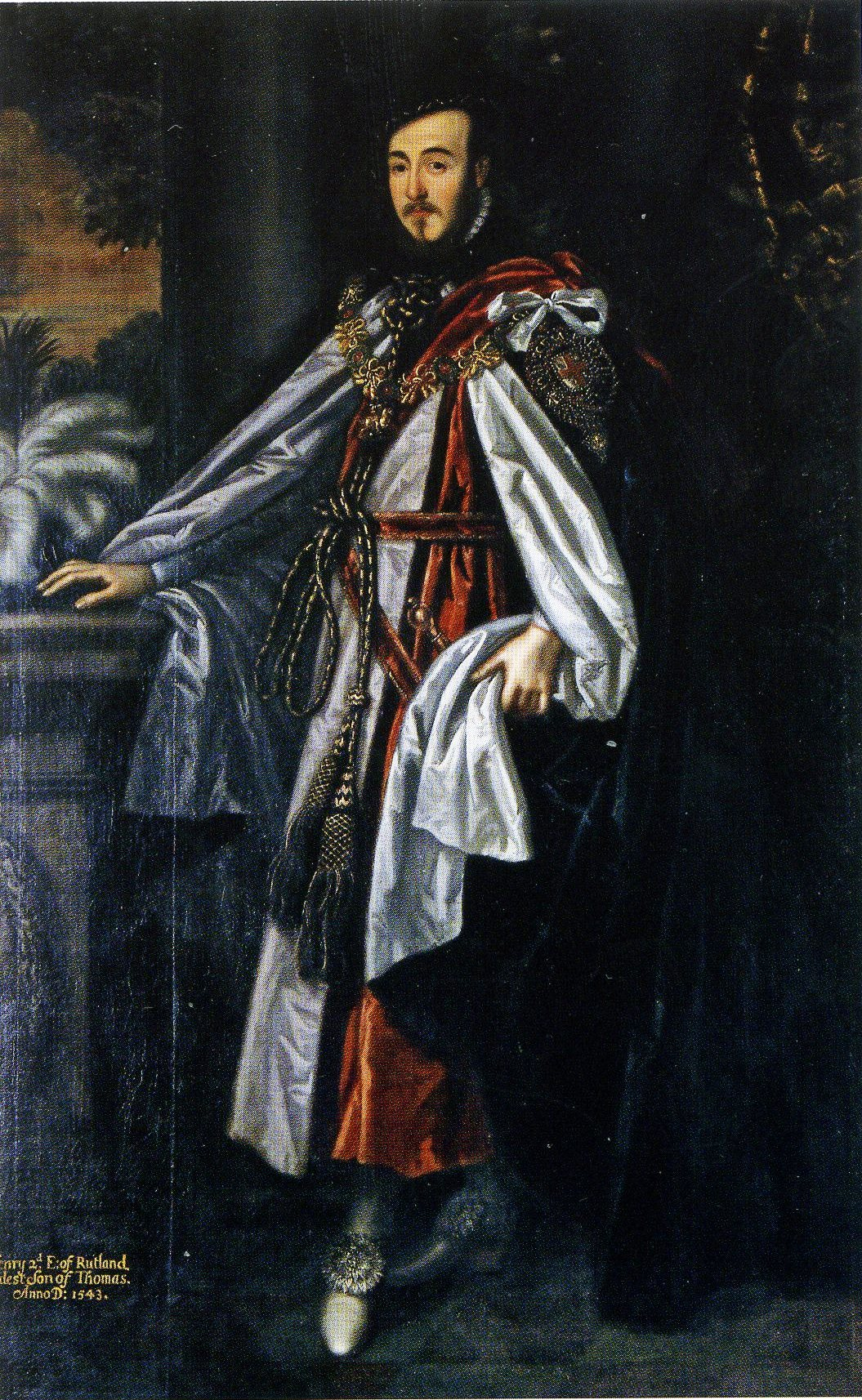
- Henry Manners, 2nd Earl of Rutland, mid-1670s, by Jeremiah van der Eyden, Belvoir Castle
- Born: 23 September 1526
- Died: 17 September 1563 (aged 36); London
- Father: Thomas Manners, 1st Earl of Rutland
- Mother: Eleanor Paston

Henry Manners, 2nd Earl of Rutland, 13th Baron de Ros of Helmsley, KG (23 September 1526 – 17 September 1563) was an English nobleman.

== Early life ==
Henry Manners was born 23 September 1526, the eldest son of Thomas Manners, 1st Earl of Rutland and his wife Eleanor Paston. He was married to Lady Margaret Neville on 3 July 1536. Henry was styled Lord Ros until his father's death in 1543, after which he succeeded as the second earl of Rutland.

== Career ==
Like his father, Earl Henry held many offices. As Warden of the Scottish Marches he reprieved the town of Haddington in June 1549, and recaptured Ferniehirst Castle. Whilst anxious to return home on account of his mother's ill health in November 1549, he was required to investigate the activities of Thomas Wyndham a sailor who had captured merchant vessels in the Forth. In December 1549, his mother-in-law, the Dowager of Westmorland, complained to him that he had established a garrison of Italian soldiers at Bywell, one her villages. He was made admiral in 1556, and the following year was Captain-general of the cavalry at the siege of St Quentin under Mary I of England. Under Elizabeth I he served successfully and she made him Lord Lieutenant of Nottinghamshire and Rutland, Knight of the Garter and President of the North.

He completed his father's design of Belvoir Castle in 1555, including "preserving the monumental remains of his ancestors, by transferring them chiefly to Bottesford", from Belvoir Priory and Croxton Abbey.

After the untimely death of Edward VI in 1553, and the subsequent death of Edward Courtenay 1st Earl of Devon in 1556, Rutland stood as Heir presumptive as the senior male descendant of Richard 3rd Duke of York. James VI/I, the son of Mary Queen of Scots would not be born until 1566. His descent can be traced through Anne of York, Duchess of Exeter.

== Marriage and issue ==
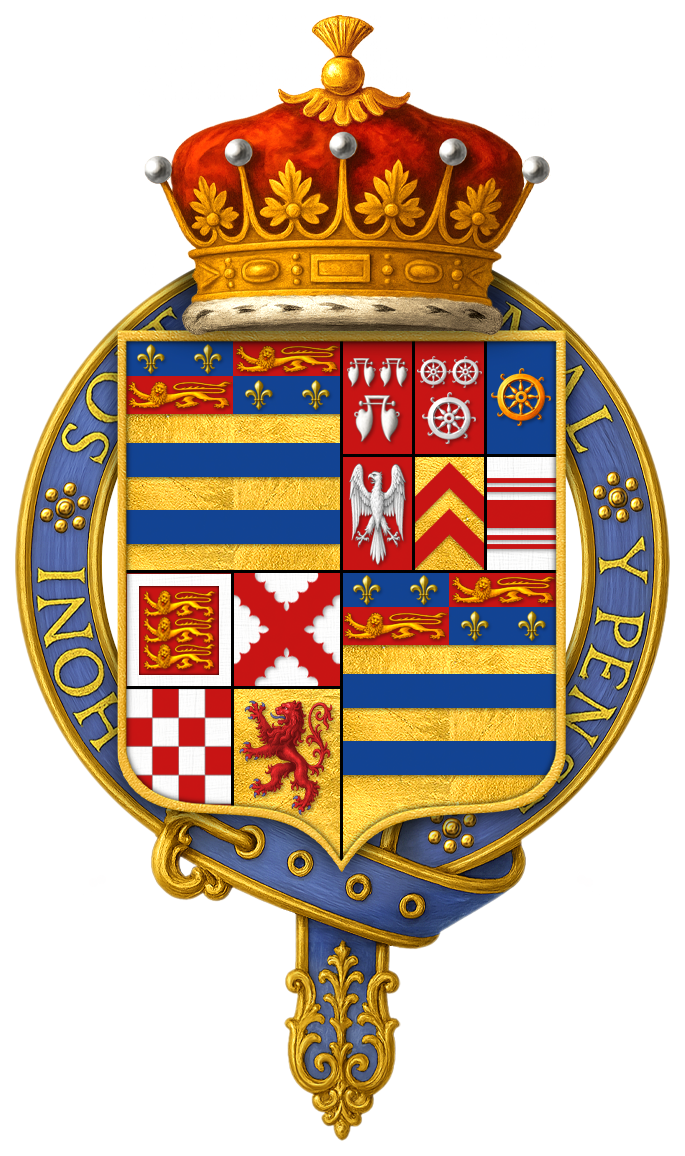
Arms of Sir Henry Manners, 2nd Earl of Rutland, KG

He married twice:

- Firstly on 3 July 1536 to Margaret Neville (died 1559), daughter of Ralph Neville, 4th Earl of Westmorland by whom he had three children:
  - Edward Manners, 3rd Earl of Rutland
  - John Manners, 4th Earl of Rutland
  - Elizabeth Manners (c. 1553 – c. 1590), who married Sir William V Courtenay (1553–1630), de jure 3rd Earl of Devon, of Powderham Castle, Devon.
- After Margaret's death, he married Bridget Hussey, the widow of Richard Morrison. Her third husband was Francis Russell, 2nd Earl of Bedford.

== Death and monument ==
Henry Manners died on 17 September 1563. In his last will, his instructions were to be buried in the Bottesford church and a "tomb, suitable to his estate, should be made there". He is buried at St Mary the Virgin's Church, Bottesford in Leicestershire. His tomb, in the centre of the chancel next to that of his father, is of alabaster and considered unique. The effigies lie beneath a decorated example of an Elizabethan dining table on heavy carved legs, suggesting an attempt to represent a communion table. Earl Henry is depicted in armour of conventional pattern except that the breastplate is made up of laminated plates. He wears a coronet and his head is supported on a tilt-heaume. He is wearing a chain nearly reaching his thighs, and the Order of the Garter is on the left leg. He holds a closed book in his right hand and a sword in his left. At his feet is a hornless unicorn. His wife, Margaret, also wears a coronet and is dressed in the style of the time, with an ermine-trimmed mantle. Her head rests on a scroll and her feet on a lion.

Monument at St Mary the Virgin's Church, Bottesford

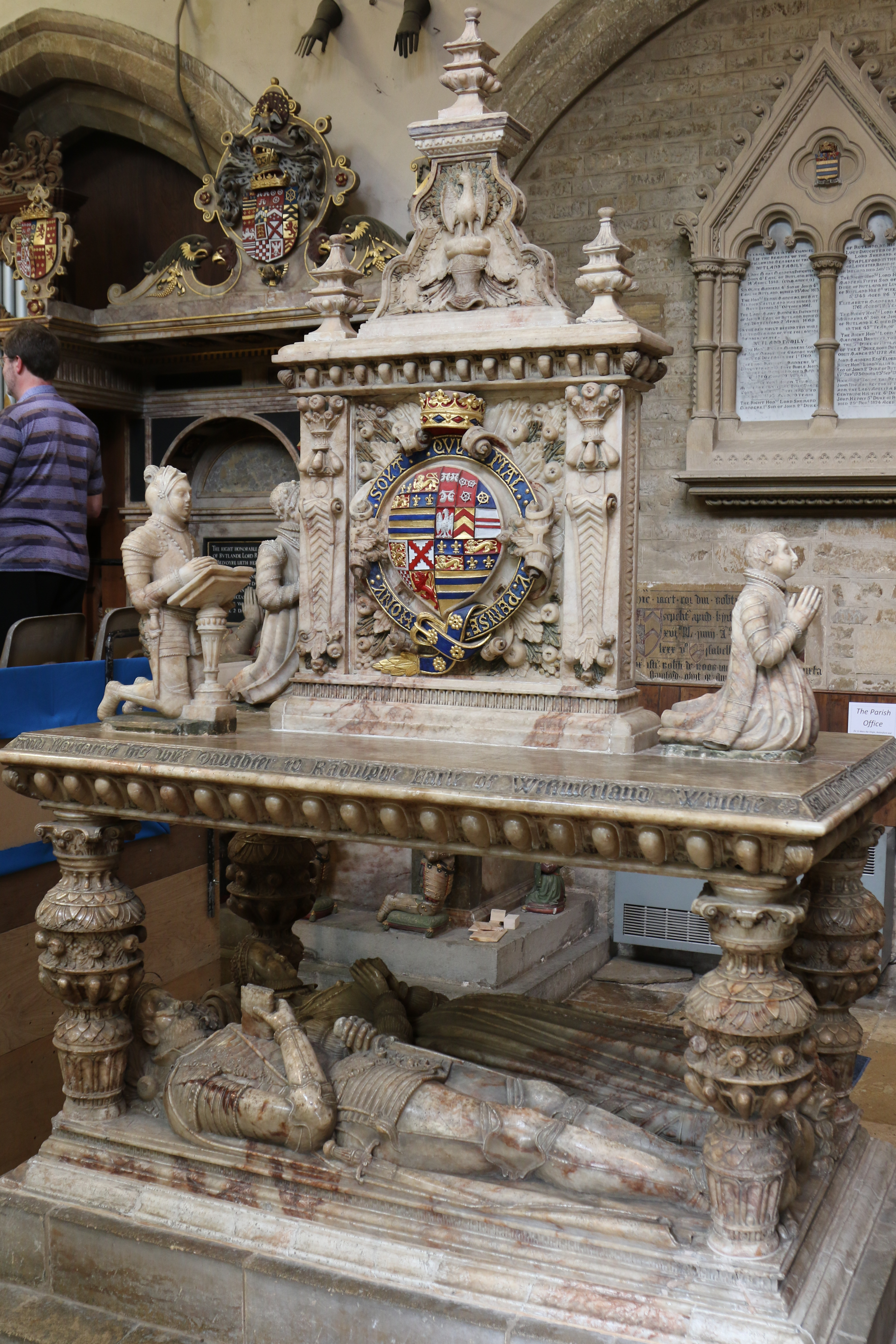
Tomb monument

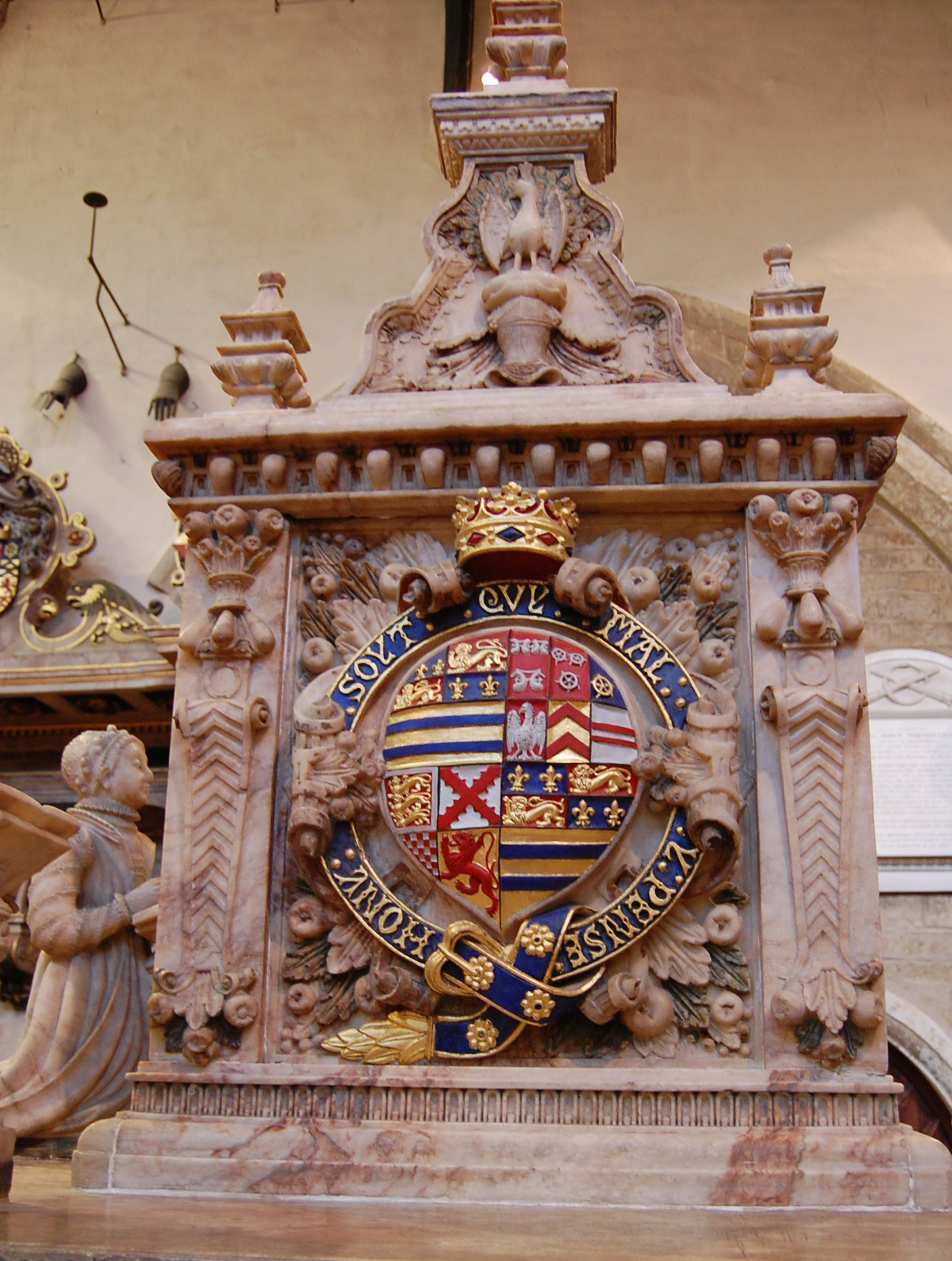
Crest

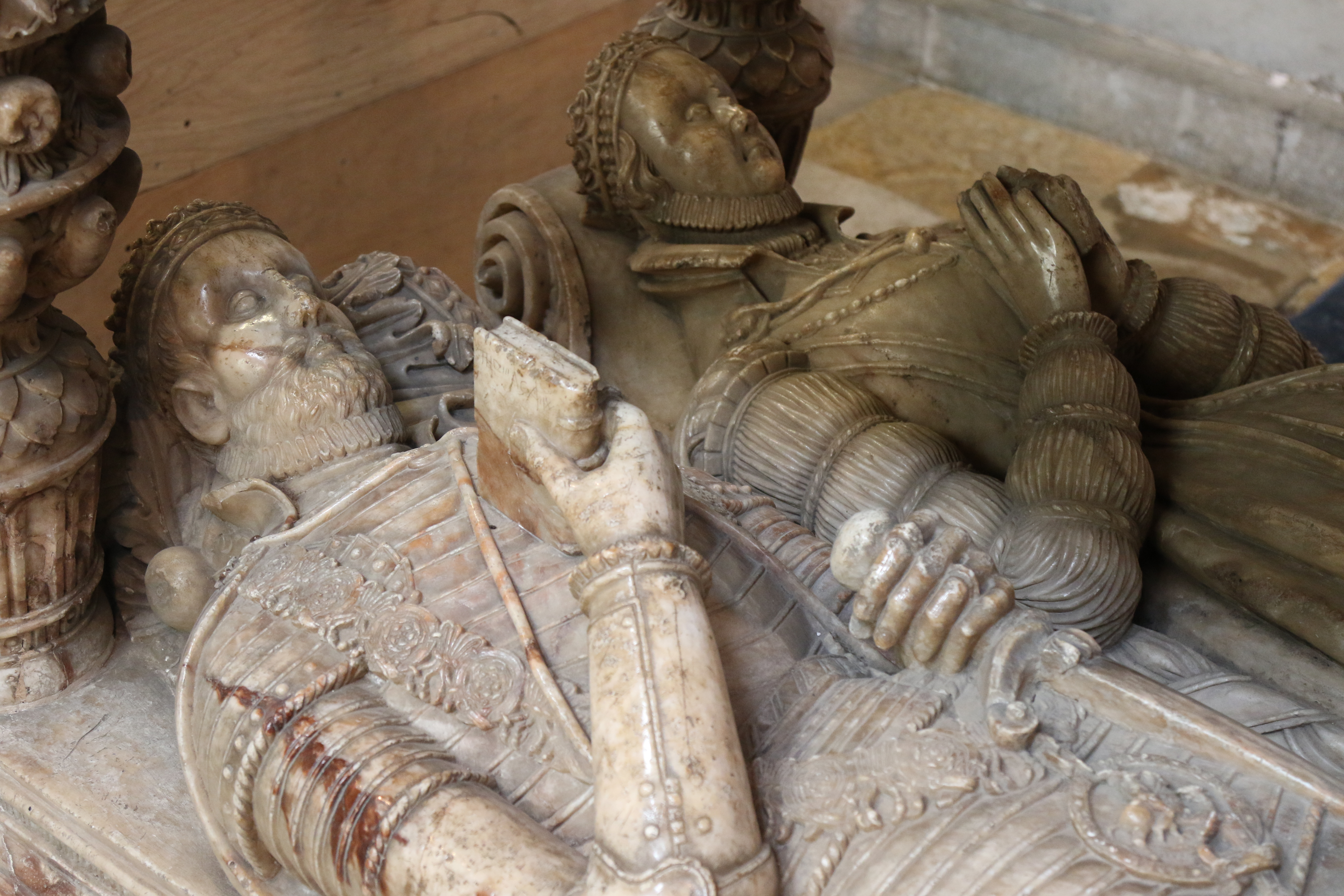
Henry Manners and wife Margaret Neville

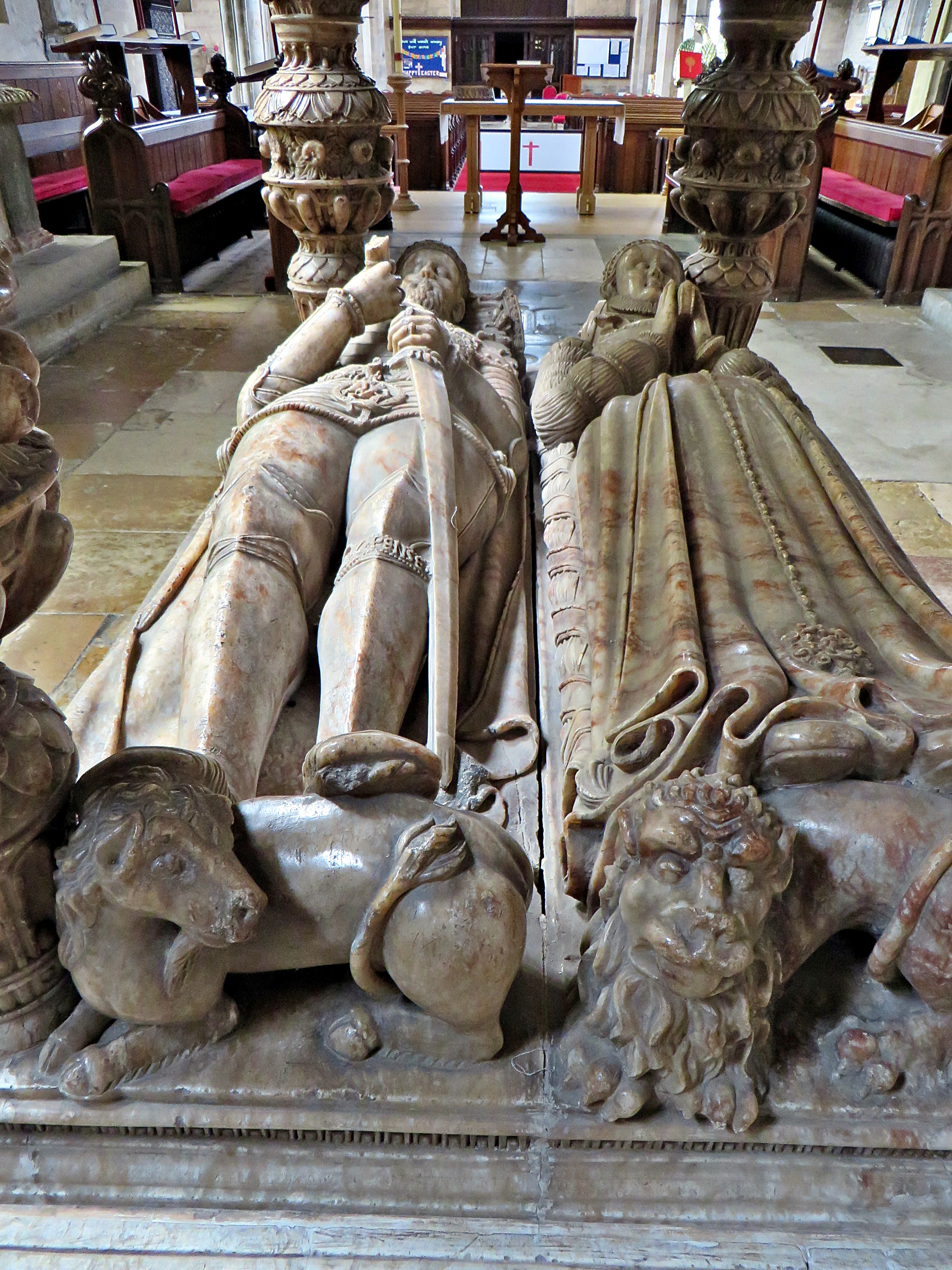
Hornless unicorn and lion at their feet

Peerage of England
Preceded by Thomas Manners	Earl of Rutland; 1543–1563	Succeeded by Edward Manners
Preceded by Thomas Manners	Baron de Ros; 1543–1563	Succeeded by Edward Manners
