= New University of Brussels =

Former university in Brussels, Belgium

- Université Nouvelle de Bruxelles
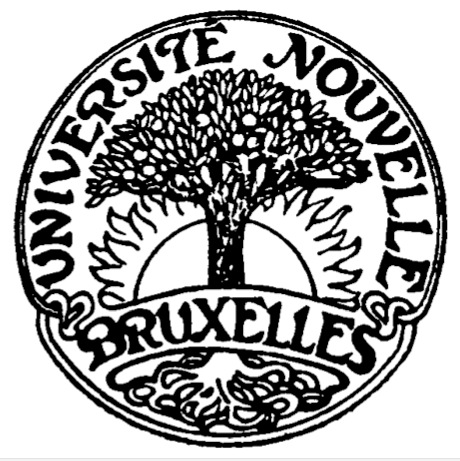
- Seal of the New University of Brussels
- Other names: Ecole Libre d'Enseignement Supérieur; Zwanze Université
- Active: October 25, 1894–1919
- Founders: Paul Janson; Edmond Picard; Guillaume De Greef; Élie Lambotte; Emile Vandervelde; Jacques des Cressonnières; Charles Dejongh; Élisée Reclus
- Accreditation: Unaccredited
- Rector: Guillaume De Greef
- Location: Brussels, Belgium
- Separated from: Free University of Brussels
- Merged into: Free University of Brussels

The New University of Brussels (French: Université nouvelle de Bruxelles) was a private university active in Brussels, Belgium, between 1894 and 1919.

Its origins were in the Free University of Brussels, a liberal institution, which became the subject of controversy in December 1892 when the anarchist geographer Élisée Reclus was prevented from teaching for political reasons. In the aftermath, a number of liberal and socialist members of faculty began to plan for an independent "new" university, eventually created in October 1894. It was libertarian in political outlook, and attracted a significant proportion of international students and faculty members. However, its degrees were not recognised by the Belgian government and it remained short of funds.

The New University was the only university in Belgium which continued teaching through the German occupation of Belgium during World War I. In 1919, however, it was decided to re-merge the institution with the Free University. Its last surviving remnant is the Institut des Hautes Etudes de Belgique which provides free public lectures and conferences.

== Faculty members ==
- Emile Vandervelde
- Paul Janson
- Edmond Picard
- Enrico Ferri
- Achille Loria
- Paul Sollier
- Célestin Demblon
- Hector Denis
- Alexandra David-Néel
- Louis de Brouckère
- Augustin Hamon
- Élisée Reclus
- Henri La Fontaine
- Paul Otlet
