= Katherine Villiers, Duchess of Buckingham =

English peeress

The Most Honourable The Marchioness of Antrim
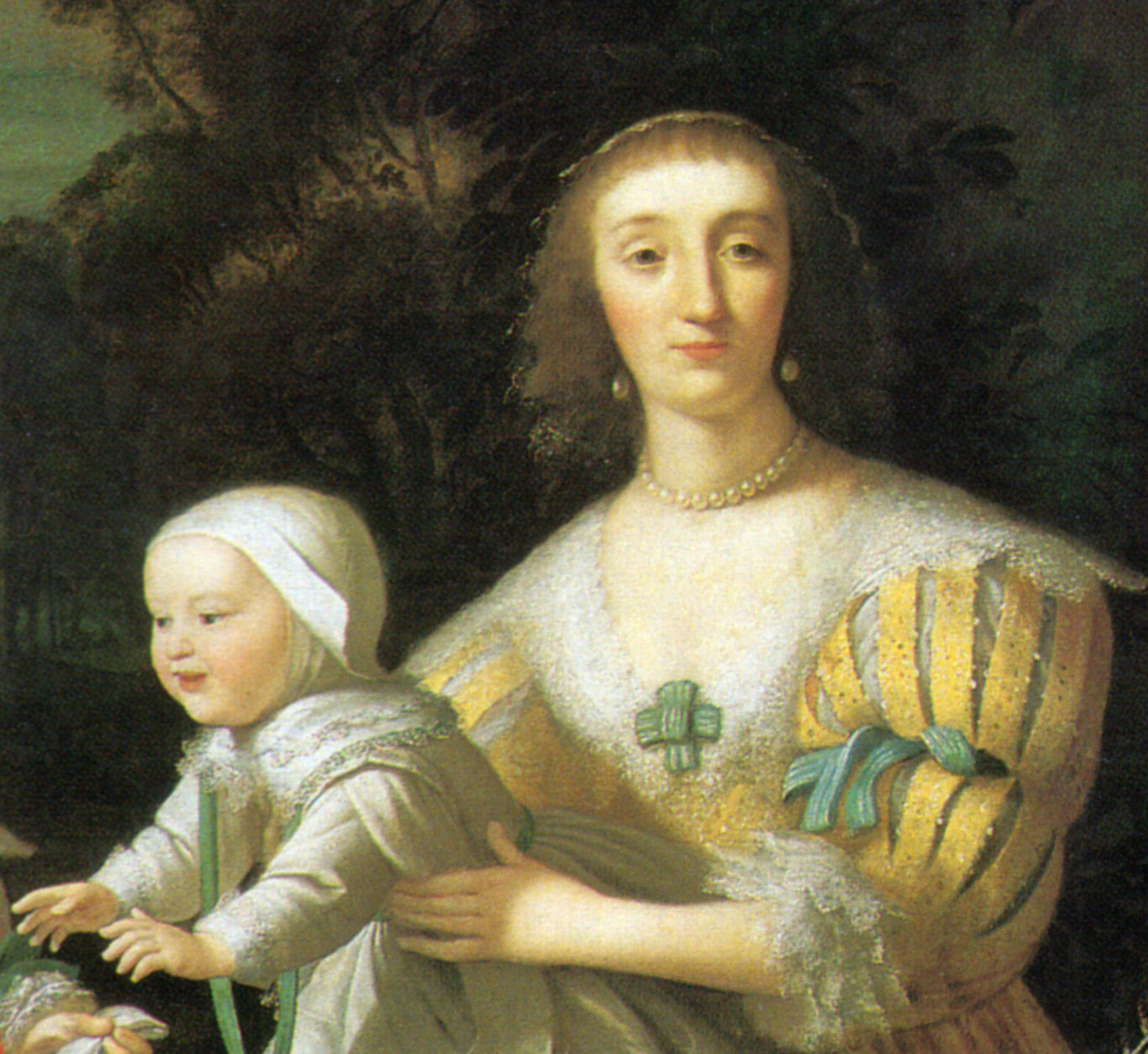
- Katherine, then Duchess of Buckingham, with her son George, 1628 (detail of larger portrait).

Personal details
- Born: Lady Katherine Manners; 1603 Belvoir Castle, Leicestershire, England
- Died: 1649 (aged 45–46) Waterford, Ireland
- Spouses: George Villiers, 1st Duke of Buckingham; Randal MacDonnell, 1st Marquess of Antrim
- Children: Mary Stewart, Duchess of Richmond; Charles Villiers, Earl of Coventry; George Villiers, 2nd Duke of Buckingham; Francis Villiers, 1629–1648
- Parents: Francis Manners, 6th Earl of Rutland; Frances Knyvet

Katherine MacDonnell, Marchioness of Antrim, 18th Baroness de Ros of Helmsley (née Manners; died 1649), better known by her first marriage as Katherine, Duchess of Buckingham, was an English aristocrat. The daughter and heiress of Francis Manners, 6th Earl of Rutland, she was known as the richest woman in Britain outside of the royal family. She married first George Villiers, 1st Duke of Buckingham, the favourite, and possibly lover, of King James I of England; and secondly, she married the Irish peer Randal MacDonnell, 1st Marquess of Antrim.

== Family ==
Lady Katherine Manners was the only daughter of Francis Manners, 6th Earl of Rutland, by his first wife, Frances Knyvet (d. before 26 November 1605), widow of Sir William Bevill of Killigarth or Kilkhampton, Cornwall, and third daughter and coheir of Sir Henry Knyvet of Charlton, Wiltshire, by Elizabeth Stumpe, the daughter of Sir James Stumpe of Bromham, Wiltshire.

In 1613 Katherine and several of her relatives fell ill at their home in Belvoir Castle, and her brother Henry died. In 1619 two former servants were convicted of having used witchcraft to attack the family.

== Marriage ==
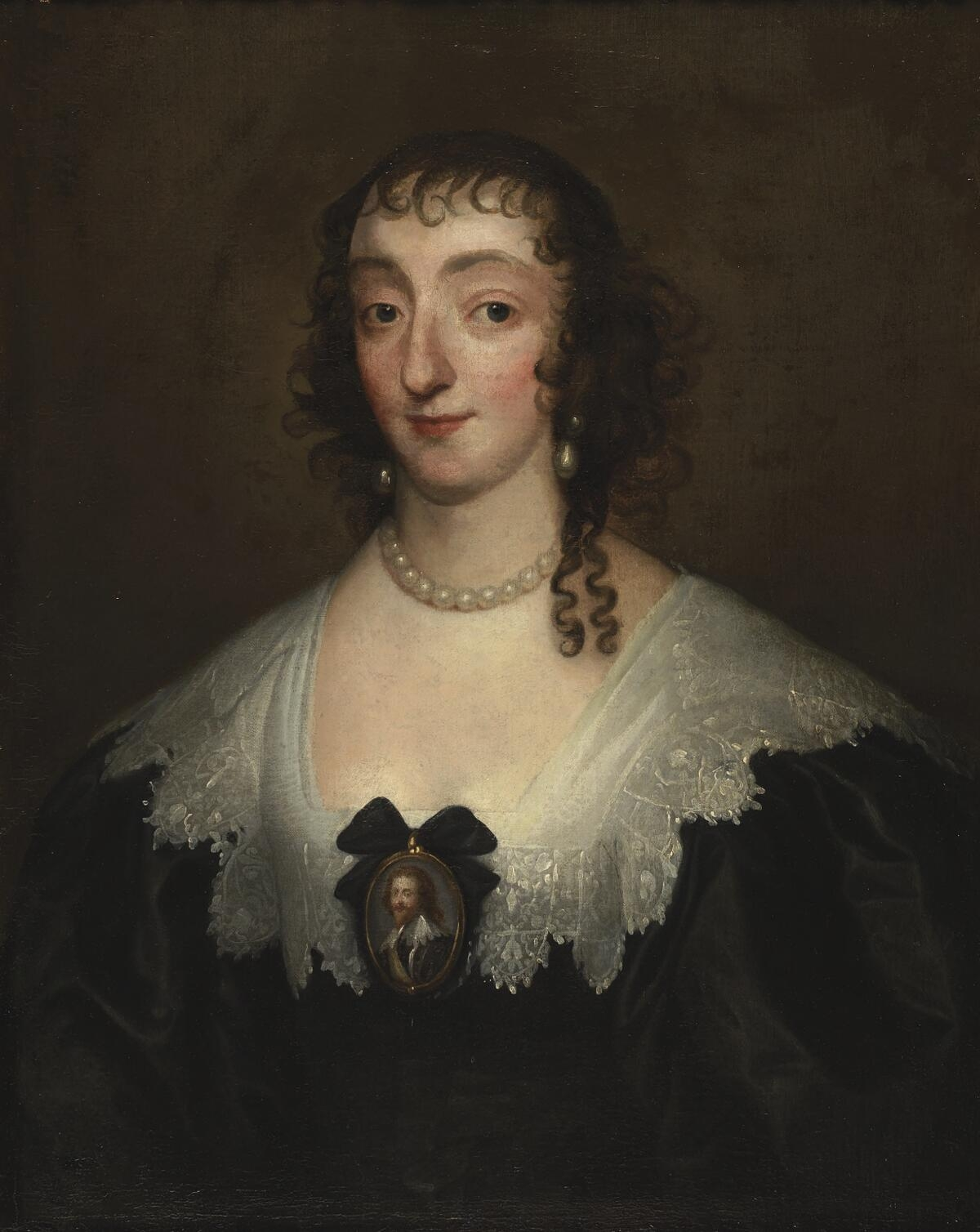
Katherine Manners, circa 1633

In 1619, King James I let it be known that he wished his favourite George Villiers to marry. Katherine Manners was selected by the formidably ambitious Mary Villiers, later Countess of Buckingham, to marry her son. However, Manners was a strict Roman Catholic, and the King refused to allow Villiers to marry her (almost the only occasion when he did not give the Villiers family whatever they asked for). In addition to this, the Earl of Rutland refused to accept the Countess of Buckingham's demands for his daughter's dowry. Manners converted to Protestantism, to satisfy the Villiers family, which almost caused her father to call off the marriage. Invited to visit the Countess of Buckingham, Katherine was forced to spend the night due to an attack of illness. Believing his daughter's honour to be compromised, the Earl of Rutland refused to receive her back, and demanded that George Villiers marry her immediately. At first Villiers refused to marry her, but did a few weeks later, on 16 May 1620.

The marriage took place quietly in London at Lumley House near Tower Hill. There was a larger celebration in August 1621, at Burley, in Rutland. Buckingham produced and performed in Ben Jonson's masque The Gypsies Metamorphosed. Nicholas Lanier supervised the music. King James and Prince Charles were present.

== Duchess of Buckingham ==
The Duchess of Buckingham was one of the few women of rank of the time whose "gentleness and womanly tenderness, devotion and purity of life", were conspicuous in the midst of the "almost universal corruption and immorality of the Court". No scandal was ever breathed against her name, and the worst that was ever said of her was that by her influence she at one time nearly persuaded her husband to become a Roman Catholic, she herself having returned to her own faith soon after her marriage. She was however jealous of Lucy Percy's relationship with her husband.

The court physician, Theodore Turquet de Mayerne, examined her on 24 January 1622 when she was pregnant. Buckingham and Balthazar Gerbier ordered alterations at York House for the Duchess. A new "Ladies Closet" was constructed at a corner of the building. Frances Stewart, Duchess of Lennox looked after her when she was ill and pregnant, making her broths and caudles. She was the mother of Mary Villiers, Duchess of Richmond and of George Villiers, 2nd Duke of Buckingham (who inherited her title as 19th Baron de Ros).

She wrote to her husband in July 1623, when he was with Prince Charles in Spain. She described her infant daughter Mary, "pretty Moll", who was not yet walking, but danced and shook her apron at the tune of a sarabande or the song Tom Duff, and would clap to a clapping dance. She would send him her picture painted by Balthazar Gerbier.

In London, she resided at Wallingford House and York House. Her rooms included the Red and Green closets or cabinets, decorated with small old master paintings. These spaces probably resembled the surviving contemporary Green closet at Ham House. A surviving pair of chairs carved in an Italian style, and painted with Villiers and Manners heraldry, may have been used in a gallery.

== Countess of Antrim ==
Katherine's first husband, Buckingham, was assassinated in 1628 by John Felton. Upon the death of her father in 1632, without male heirs, she succeeded suo jure to the ancient barony of de Ros. In 1635 she married Randal McDonnell, Earl of Antrim, and went to live at Dunluce Castle, County Antrim, Ireland. She employed the London furniture maker Ralph Grynder.

Following the Catholic uprising in Ulster in 1641 the MacDonnell family moved south to Wexford, then Waterford, where Katherine died in 1649. She was buried outside the walls of Waterford and it is speculated that she may have been a victim of the plague. Her possessions passed to her son and her effigy was added beside that of her first husband in Westminster Abbey.

== Notes ==
Peerage of England
Preceded by Francis Manners	Baroness de Ros; 1632–1649	Succeeded by George Villiers
