= St Mary the Virgin's Church, Bottesford =

Coordinates: 52.9435°N 0.8001°W

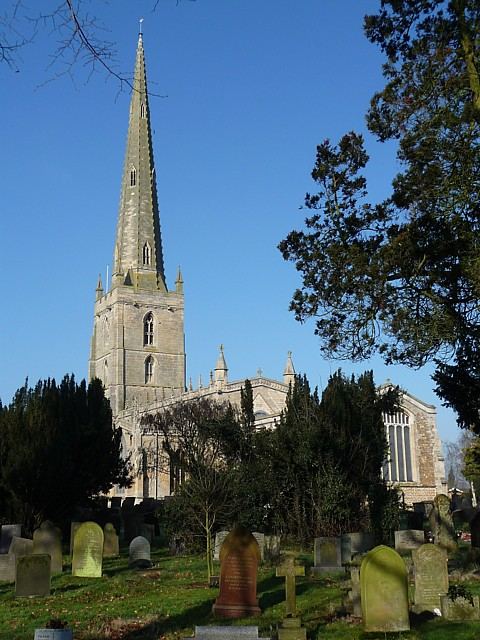
- St Mary the Virgin's Church, Bottesford, from the southeast

- Location in Leicestershire
- OS grid reference: SK 807 391
- Location: Bottesford, Leicestershire
- Country: England
- Denomination: Anglican
- Website: St Mary, Bottesford

History
- Status: Parish church
- Dedication: Saint Mary the Virgin

Architecture
- Functional status: Active
- Heritage designation: Grade I
- Designated: 1 January 1968
- Architect(s): Sharpe and Paley (1847–48 restoration)
- Architectural type: Church
- Style: Gothic

Administration
- Diocese: Leicester
- Archdeaconry: Leicester
- Deanery: Framland
- Parish: Bottesford

Clergy
- Vicar: Revd F. P. R. J. Connell

St Mary the Virgin's Church is in the village of Bottesford, Leicestershire, England. It is an active Anglican parish church in the deanery of Framland, the archdeaconry of Leicester and the diocese of Leicester. Its benefice is united with those of eight local parishes. The church is recorded in the National Heritage List for England as a designated Grade I listed building.

== History ==
Sometimes known as the "Lady of the Vale", it is a large church which has the 2nd highest spire in Leicestershire (at 212 feet). The oldest part of the church dates from the 12th century, with additions and alterations made during the following three centuries, including the nave and spire in the 15th century. There are two gargoyles on the south transept. The chancel was rebuilt in the 17th century to accommodate the monuments of the Manners family, earls (later dukes) of Rutland, which completely fill it. The monuments include work by Caius Gabriel Cibber and Gerard Johnson the elder. One of the Rutland tombs is famous for its inscription, which attributes two family deaths to witchcraft by the Witches of Belvoir.

A number of restorations were carried out during the 19th century. The restoration in 1847–48 was carried out by the Lancaster partnership of Sharpe and Paley. This involved restoring the nave, aisles, and transepts, replacing the seating and the roofs of the aisles, removing the gallery, inserting the tower screen, adding new pinnacles, reflooring the church and replacing windows. This cost £2,235 (equivalent to £230,000 in 2025), towards which the Duke of Rutland gave £600, the Revd F. J. Norman gave £550, and a grant of £110 was received from the Incorporated Church Building Society.

A headstone to Thomas Parker and a table tomb in the churchyard are both Grade II listed, as are the gate piers and gates to the churchyard to the north. The churchyard contains war graves of fifteen Commonwealth service (mainly Royal Air Force) personnel, five from the First World War and ten from the Second World War.

== Rectors of Bottesford ==
- Raph de Albiniaco 1223
- Nicholas de Belvoir 1234 - 1273
- Peter de Ros 1273 - 1289
- William de Filungele 1289 - 1325
- Gilbert de Wyggeton until 1332
- Sir Adam de Staynegrave from 1332
- Henry de Codyngton 1374 - 1404
- John Freeman 1420
- Robert Jackson
- William Constable
- John Whittinge 1558
- Robert Cressey 1560
- Samuel Fleming 1581 - 1620
- Francis Allen 1621
- Richus Langham 1624
- Anthony Marshall 1662 - 1679
- Thomas White 1679 - 1685
- Caradocus Creed 1685
- Abel Ligonier 1698 - 1710
- Lewis Griffin 1711 - 1735
- Bernard Wilson 1735 (presented but never took possession)
- John Ewer 1735 - 1753
- Richard Stevens 1753 - 1771
- George Turner 1771 - 1782
- Sir John Thoroton 1782 - 1820
- Charles Roos Thornton 1821 - 1846
- Canon Frederick John Norman 1846 – 1889
- Canon Robert Manners Norman 1889 – 1895
- William Vincent-Jackson 1895 - 1917
- Frank Walford 1918 – 1943
- Canon Alfred Thomas Gardner Blackmore 1943 – 1958
- Canon William Nelson Metcalfe 1959 – 1982
- Kenneth Aubrey Dyke 1982 – 1992
- Geoffrey Spencer 1993 – 1998
- Charles Bradshaw 1999 – 2004
- Stuart J. Foster 2005 – 2009

== Organ ==
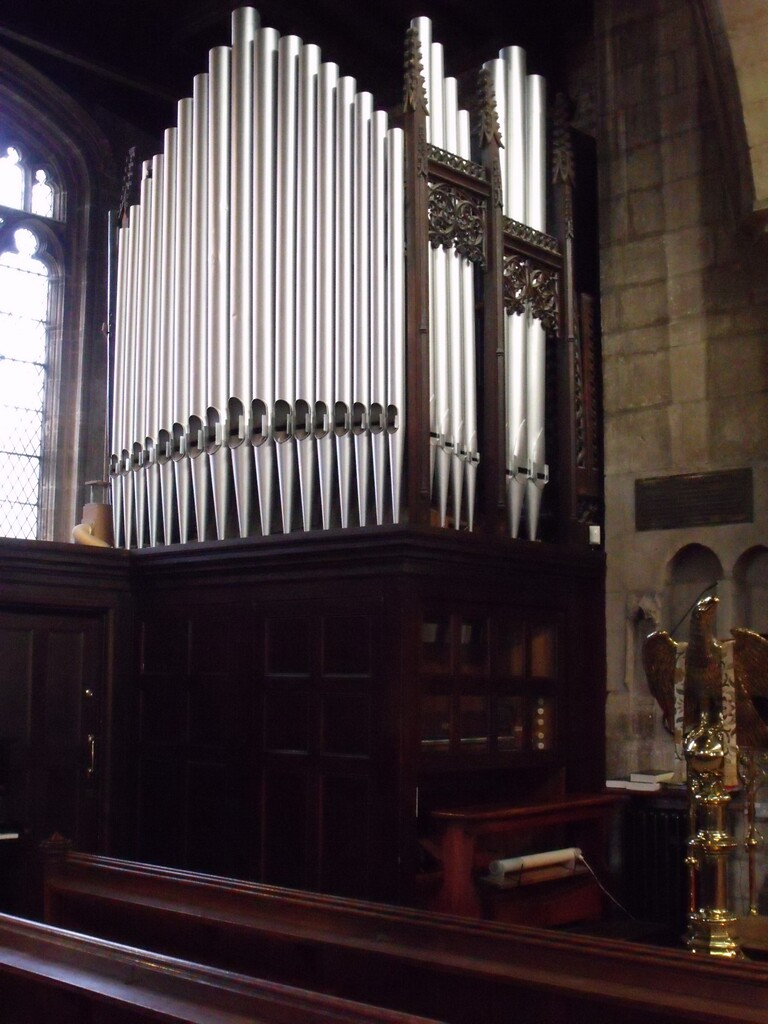
Organ in St Mary's Church, Bottesford

A pipe organ was built by Forster and Andrews and opened on 11 October 1859 by Henry Farmer. It was modified by Wadsworth in 1892. In 1995 Norman Hall and Sons installed a second-hand organ by T.C. Lewis from St Hugh’s Church, Southwark. It comprises 2 manuals and pedals and has 15 speaking stops.

=== Organists ===
- James Moore 1859 - 1908 (blind)
- Miss. C.H. Read 1908 - 1910 (formerly assistant organist at St Wulfram's Church, Grantham)
- Professor Samuel Corbett 1910 - 1912 (blind)
- H. Keeton Hardwick 1912 - 1914 (formerly organist of St John’s Church, Spittlegate, Grantham, afterwards organist at Warwick, Queensland)
- Miss Beatrice James 1914 - 1926
- Fred W. Carter 1926 - 1971
- Paul Willcock
- Chris Coe

== Burials ==
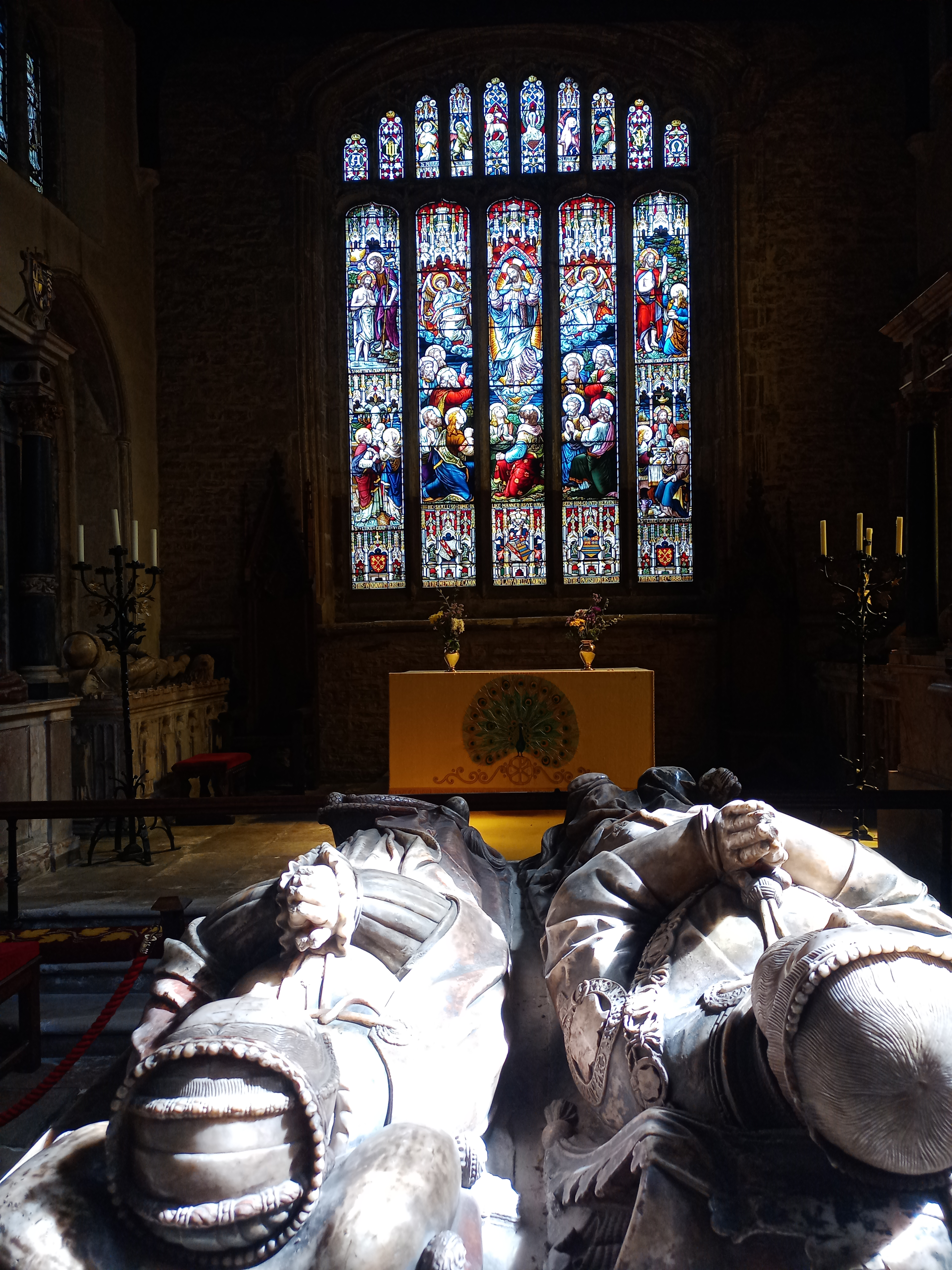
One of the many monuments in the chancel

- Thomas Manners, 1st Earl of Rutland
- Eleanor Paston, Countess of Rutland
- Henry Manners, 2nd Earl of Rutland and his wife Margaret Neville (d. 13 October 1559)
- Edward Manners, 3rd Earl of Rutland and his wife Isabel Holcroft
- John Manners, 4th Earl of Rutland and his wife Elizabeth Charlton, daughter of Francis Charlton of Apley Castle
- Roger Manners, 5th Earl of Rutland and his wife Elizabeth Sidney, daughter of Sir Philip Sidney
- Francis Manners, 6th Earl of Rutland
- George Manners, 7th Earl of Rutland
- John Manners, 8th Earl of Rutland and his wife Lady Frances Montagu Manners
- Elizabeth Manners, Duchess of Rutland in the family vault

== See also ==
- List of works by Sharpe and Paley
- Treasure Houses of Britain – 1985 TV documentary that opens at the church
