= Edward Manners, 3rd Earl of Rutland =

Edward Manners
- 3rd Earl of Rutland
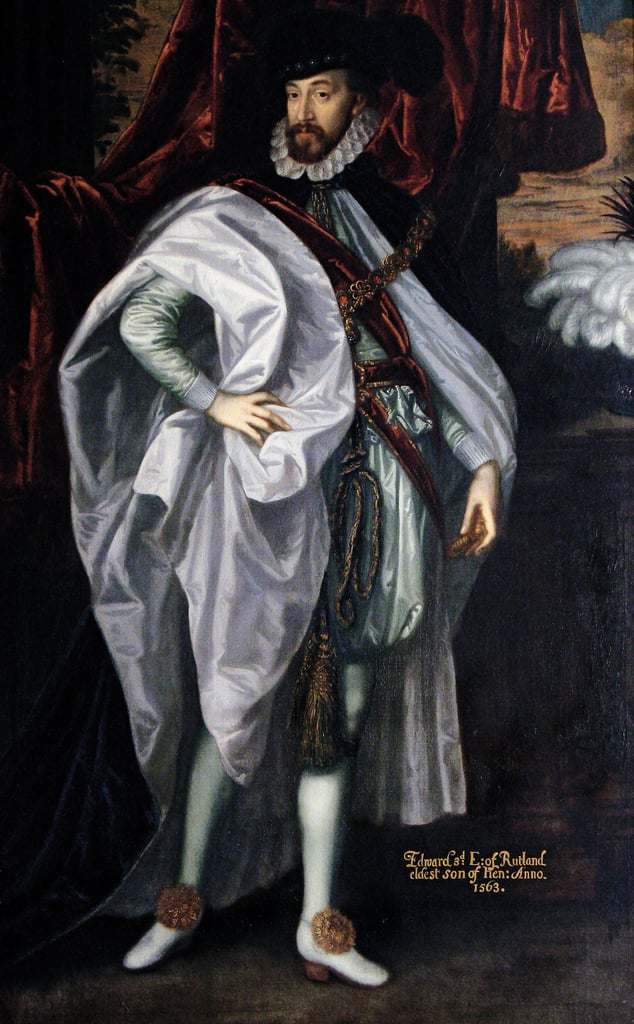
- Born: 12 July 1549
- Died: 14 April 1587 (aged 37); London
- Spouse: Isabel Holcroft
- Issue: Elizabeth Manners, 16th Baroness de Ros
- Father: Henry Manners, 2nd Earl of Rutland
- Mother: Margaret Neville

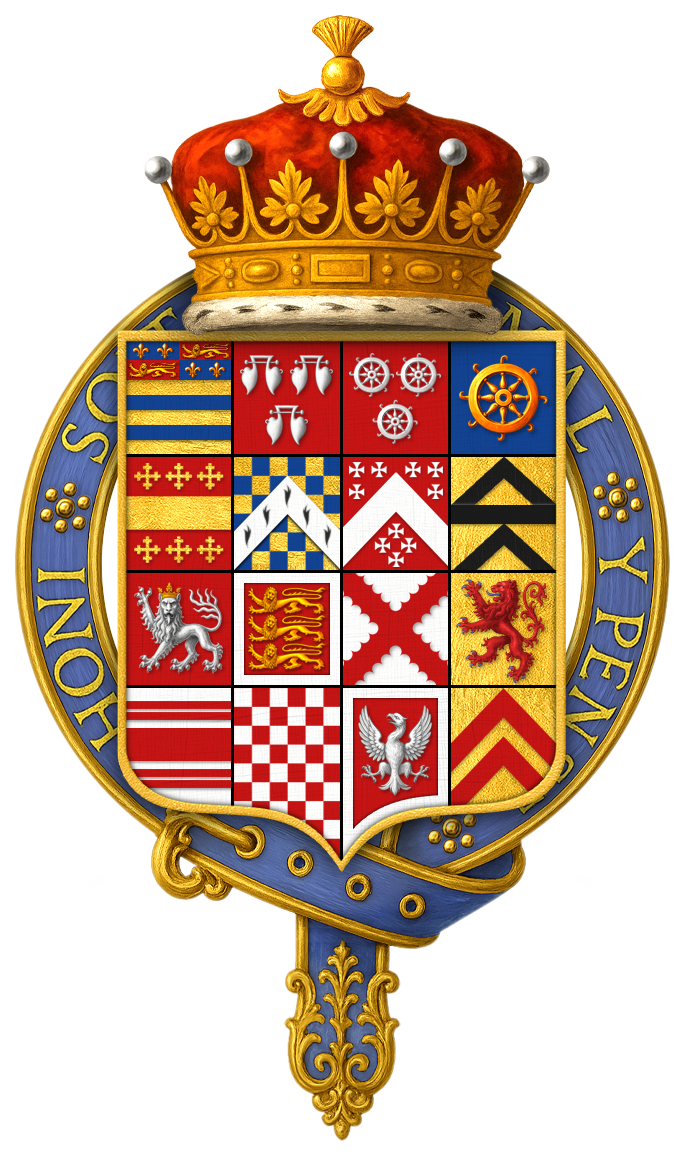
Quartered arms of Sir Edward Manners, 3rd Earl of Rutland, KG

Edward Manners, 3rd Earl of Rutland, 14th Baron de Ros of Helmsley, KG (12 July 1549 – 14 April 1587) was the son of Henry Manners, 2nd Earl of Rutland, whose titles he inherited in 1563.

== Life ==
He was the eldest son of Henry Manners, 2nd Earl of Rutland, and Margaret, fourth daughter of Ralph Neville, 4th Earl of Westmorland. He seems to have been educated at Oxford, though he did not graduate there as a student. He bore the title of Lord Roos or Ros, the old title of his family, until 1563, when by the death of his father he became third Earl of Rutland.

He was made one of the queen's wards, and was specially under the charge of Sir William Cecil, who was connected with him by marriage. He accompanied the queen on her visit to Cambridge in 1564, and was lodged in St. John's College, and created M.A. on 10 August. In October 1566, he was made M.A. of Oxford. In 1569, he joined the Earl of Sussex, taking his tenants with him, and held a command in the army which suppressed the northern insurrection. In 1570, he passed into France, Cecil drawing up a paper of instructions for his guidance. He was in Paris in February of the next year. At home, he received many offices, and displayed enthusiastic devotion to the queen. On 5 August 1570, he became constable of Nottingham Castle, and steward, keeper, warden, and chief justice of Sherwood Forest; in 1571 he was feodary of the duchy of Lancaster for the counties of Nottingham and Derby; in 1574 he was appointed lord-lieutenant of Nottinghamshire.

On 17 June 1577, Rutland was placed on the ecclesiastical commission for the province of York, and in 1579 on the council of the north. In the grand tilting match of 1580, Rutland and twelve others contended with a similar number, headed by Essex, before the queen at Westminster. His public offices probably now absorbed all his time, as in 1581 a relative, John Manners, seems to have been managing his estate. On 23 April 1584, he became K.G., and on 14 June 1585 lord-lieutenant of Lincolnshire. His style of living was very expensive; when he went with his countess to London in about 1586 he had with him forty-one servants, including a chaplain, trumpeter, gardener, and apothecary. He bought a brooch with an agate stone engraved with a portrait of Elizabeth I and set around with 53 diamonds from Peter Vanlore.

In June 1586, with Lord Eure and Randolph, he arranged a treaty of peace with the Scots at Berwick, and his brother Roger wrote that his conduct had been approved by the court. On 6 October, he was one of the commissioners to try Mary Queen of Scots. The queen promised to make him lord chancellor after the death of Sir Thomas Bromley, which took place on 12 April 1587, and he was for a day or two so styled. He died, however, on 14 April 1587, at his house at Ivy Bridge in the Strand.

== Marriage and progeny ==
On 6 June 1573 he married Isabel Holcroft, a daughter of Thomas Holcroft (1505-1558), a Member of Parliament and commissioner at the Dissolution of the Monasteries, who built a mansion house at Vale Royal on the site of the former Cistercian abbey. By his wife he had one child and sole heiress:

- Elizabeth Manners, 15th Baroness de Ros (1575-1591), who inherited the Barony of Ros, an ancient barony created by writ. The other titles created by letters patent were able to pass to a male heir only. Most of the estates were in tail male and similarly descended to the heir male.

== Death and burial ==
He died on Good Friday at Puddle Wharf in the City of London, and was brought home for burial in St Mary's Church, Bottesford, Leicestershire, where his monument survives. The Earldom of Rutland and Barony of Manners went to his brother John Manners, 4th Earl of Rutland, but the Barony of de Ros was able to pass to his daughter.

== Legacy ==
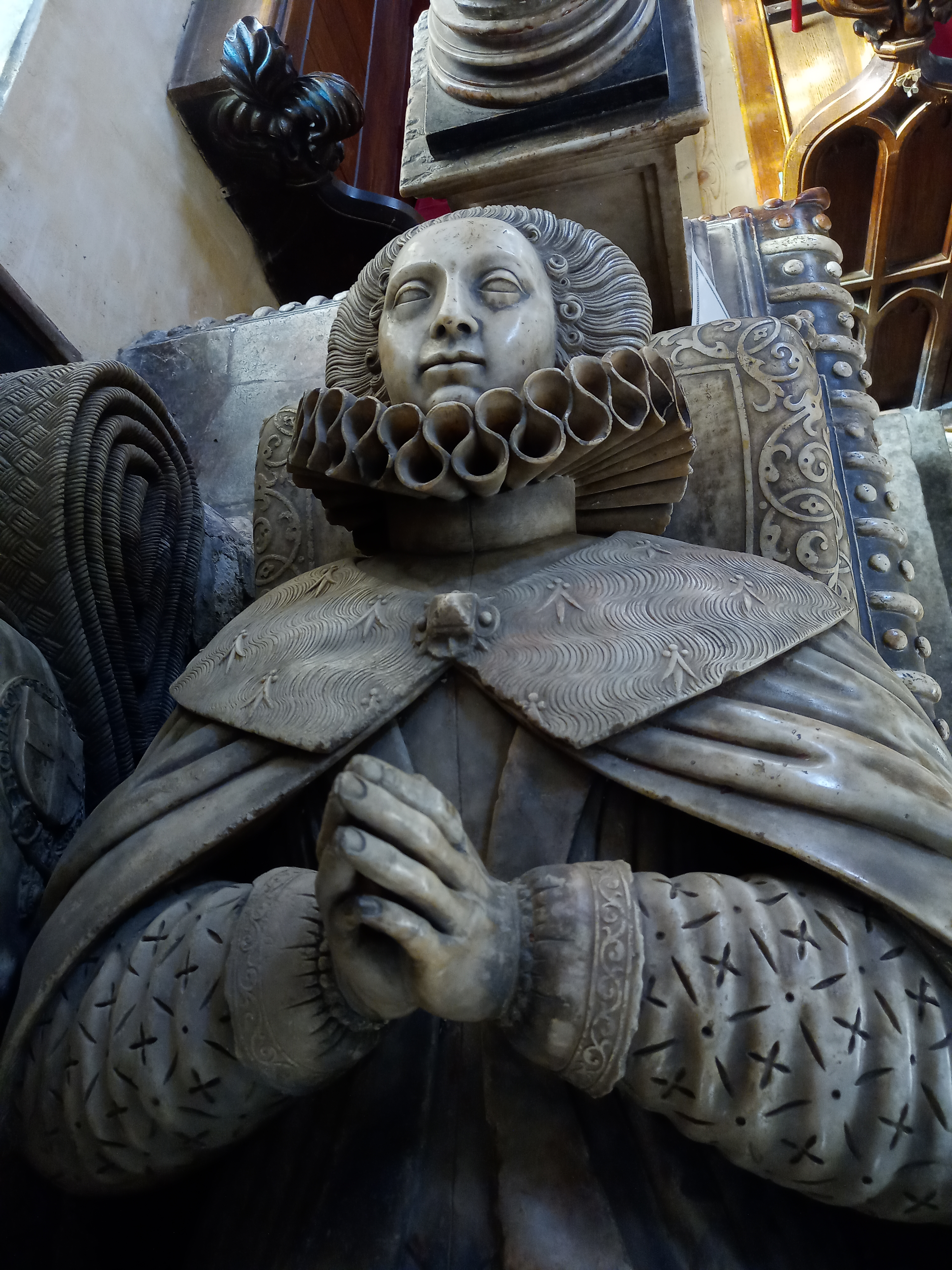
Isabel (born Holcroft)'s effigy in St Mary's, Bottesford

At St Mary's Church, Bottesford in Leicestershire there is the tomb commemorating the third Earl and his wife. It was created by Gerard Johnson the elder of Southwark, a Flemish craftsman. Earl Edward lies on a mat, wearing full plate armour. Instead of a gorget protecting his throat he wears a ruff. He wears the Order of the Garter on his left leg. His coronet has disappeared and at his feet is a decorated bull crest. Countess Isabel, daughter of Sir Thomas Holcroft, KT, wears a ruff with the usual dress of the time under an ermine-trimmed mantle, her head supported by a cushion. Her only daughter, Elizabeth, kneels at her feet. The inscription on the tomb lists the Earl's activities in the Scottish "troubles" of the time.

== Notes ==
Attribution

This article incorporates text from a publication now in the public domain: Archbold, William Arthur Jobson (1893). "Manners, Edward". In Lee, Sidney (ed.). Dictionary of National Biography. Vol. 36. London: Smith, Elder & Co.

Political offices
Preceded by Sir John Byron, Sr.	Custos Rotulorum of Nottinghamshire bef. 1573–1587	Succeeded by The Earl of Rutland
Unknown	Lord Lieutenant of Nottinghamshire; 1574–1587	Succeeded by The Earl of Rutland
Preceded by Unknown	Lord Lieutenant of Lincolnshire; 1582–1587	Succeeded by The Lord Burghley
Peerage of England
Preceded by Henry Manners	Earl of Rutland; 1563–1587	Succeeded by John Manners
Preceded by Henry Manners	Baron de Ros; 1563–1587	Succeeded by Elizabeth Manners
