= Francis Manners, 6th Earl of Rutland =

English nobleman

Francis Manners
- Earl of Rutland
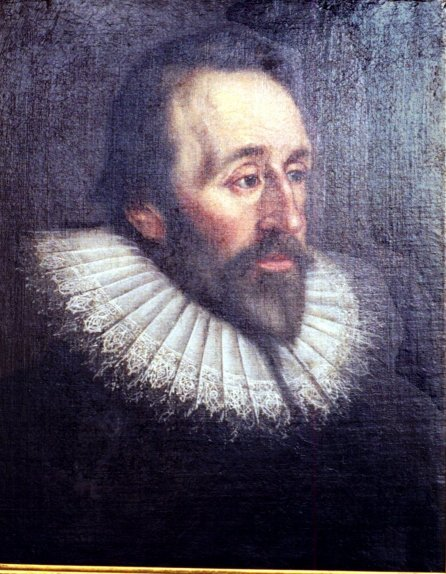
- The 6th Earl of Rutland
- Born: 1578
- Died: 17 December 1632 (aged 53–54); Bishop's Stortford, Hertfordshire
- Buried: 20 February 1633; Church of St Mary the Virgin, Bottesford, Leicestershire
- Noble family: Manners
- Spouses: Frances Knyvet; Cecily Tufton
- Issue: Henry Manners; Francis Manners; Katherine Manners
- Father: John Manners, 4th Earl of Rutland
- Mother: Elizabeth Charlton

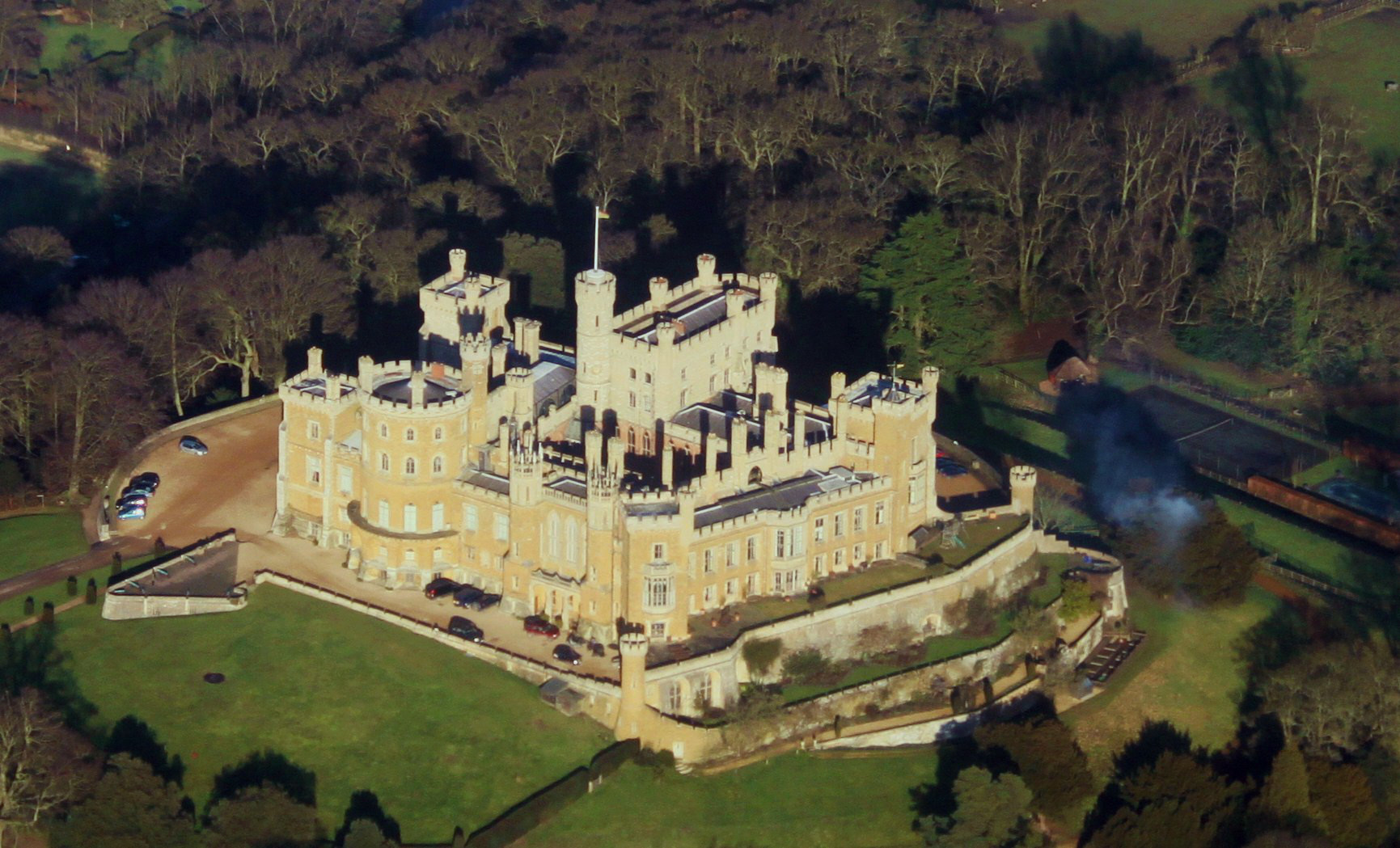
Belvoir Castle

Francis Manners, 6th Earl of Rutland, KG KB (1578–1632) was an English nobleman. Despite a brief imprisonment for his involvement in the Essex Rebellion of 1601, he became prominent at the court of James I. He lived at Belvoir Castle in Leicestershire. In 1618 three women, the "Witches of Belvoir", were accused of witchcraft for having allegedly caused the deaths of his two young sons.

== Biography ==
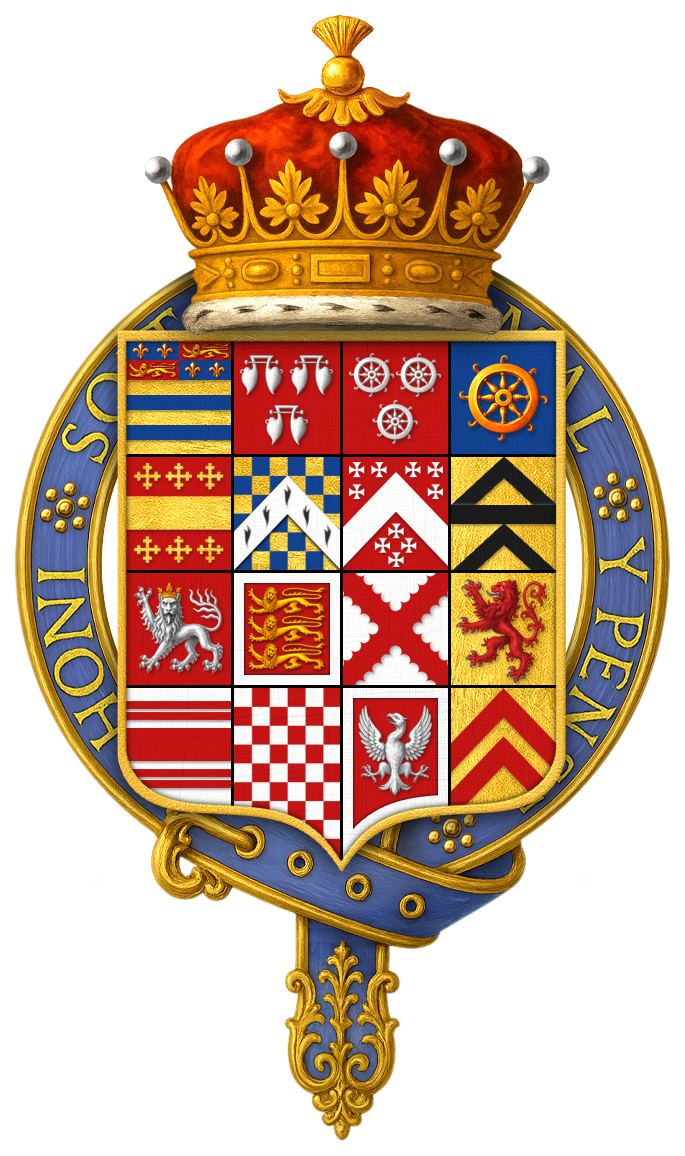
Quartered arms of Sir Francis Manners, 6th Earl of Rutland, KG

Francis Manners was the second son of John Manners, 4th Earl of Rutland, and Elizabeth Charlton (died 1595), the daughter of Francis Charlton of Apley Castle, Shropshire.

In 1598, he went abroad, travelling through France, Germany, and Italy, probably in the company of the former school teacher Robert Dalllington and Inigo Jones. On his return to England he took part, along with his older brother Roger and their younger brother George, in the 1601 rebellion of Robert Devereux, 2nd Earl of Essex, and was imprisoned in the Poultry Counter. He was fined a thousand marks and committed to the custody of his uncle Roger at Enfield. Sir Robert Cecil, however, obtained a remission of the fine, and thus the affair cost little either to him or his brother George. As soon as he was free he wrote a penitent letter to his uncle Sir John Manners of Haddon. In November 1601, he became a member of the Inner Temple.

On 28 June 1603, Francis Manners travelled with his brother to Denmark to present the Order of the Garter to Christian IV, accompanied by 'picture maker' Inigo Jones among others. He was prominent at the court of James I, and was created a Knight of the Bath on 4 January 1605 at the same time as Prince Charles. On 26 June 1612, he succeeded Roger as the 6th earl of Rutland, and was made lord-lieutenant of Lincolnshire on 15 July of that year. On 7 August he entertained James I at Belvoir, and the king repeated the visit five times in the after years. He held the offices of constable of Nottingham Castle and keeper of Sherwood Forest from October 1612 until April 1620, and carried the target or shield in the funeral procession of Henry Frederick, Prince of Wales.

Manners was made a Knight of the Garter on 24 April 1616. On 6 April 1617 Manners became a member of the Privy Council and accompanied the king into Scotland the same year.

The title of Lord Ros or Roos had been carried by Elizabeth Cecil, 16th Baroness de Ros, a daughter of the third Earl of Rutland, into the Cecil family, but Rutland claimed it on the death of William Cecil, 16th Baron de Ros, in 1618. He was created warden and chief justice of the royal forests north of the Trent on 13 November 1619, and custos rotulorum for Northamptonshire on 7 February 1623. Although he seems to have disapproved of an extreme policy in church matters, his family connection with his son-in-law, George Villiers, 1st Duke of Buckingham, secured him the appointment, on 21 April 1623, of admiral of the fleet to bring home Prince Charles from Spain. In 1624, Rutland and his wife were named as suspected Catholic recusants, but this does not appear to have affected his standing at court. At the 1625 coronation of Charles I, he bore the rod with the dove.

Rutland died on 17 December 1632 at an inn in Bishops Stortford, Hertfordshire, and was buried on 20 February 1633 in the parish church at Bottesford, Leicestershire. He was succeeded by his younger brother, George, who became the 7th Earl.

== Employing Shakespeare ==
A discovery was made by W. H. Stevenson in 1905 among some records being kept in Belvoir Castle of an entry that indicates that in March 1613, the year that the Globe theatre would later burn down during a performance of Henry VIII, William Shakespeare and Richard Burbage, who was skilled as a portrait painter of his fellow actors, were each paid forty-four shillings in gold for creating and painting the Earl of Rutland's emblem. This decorative emblem was to be used at a festive tournament later that month at Whitehall in London, which was to celebrate the accession of James I ten years earlier.

== Family ==
Rutland married firstly, on 6 May 1602, Frances Knyvet (died before 26 November 1605), (third daughter and coheir of Sir Henry Knyvet of Charlton, Wiltshire and Elizabeth, the daughter of Sir James Stumpe of Bromham, Wiltshire), and widow of Sir William Bevill of Killigarth or Kilkhampton, Cornwall. They had a daughter, Katherine, who on 16 May 1620 married George Villiers, 1st Duke of Buckingham. After Buckingham's death, Katherine married Randal MacDonnell, 1st Marquess of Antrim.

Rutland married secondly, after 26 October 1608, Cecily, eldest daughter of Sir John Tufton of Hothfield, (and his second wife, Christian, daughter of Sir Humphrey Browne), and widow of Sir Edward Hungerford. They had two sons, Henry (died 1613) and Francis (died 5 March 1620), whose deaths in infancy were attributed to sorcery. The Flower family, known as the "Witches of Belvoir", were said to have prevented the couple having more children by making a charm from wool from their mattress and a pair of gloves.

Witchcraft is mentioned in the inscription on the Earl of Rutland's tomb in St Mary the Virgin's Church, Bottesford: "In 1608 he married ye lady Cecila Hungerford, daughter to ye Honorable Knight Sir John Tufton, by whom he had two sons, both of which died in their infancy by wicked practises and sorcerye".

== Notes ==
Legal offices
| Preceded by The Marquess of Buckingham | Justice in Eyre north of the Trent; 1619–1632 | Succeeded by The Earl of Arundel |
Peerage of England
| Preceded by Roger Manners | Earl of Rutland; 1612–1632 | Succeeded by George Manners |
| Preceded by William Cecil | Baron de Ros; 1618–1632 | Succeeded by Katherine Villiers |
