= Witches of Belvoir =

Mother and daughters accused of witchcraft

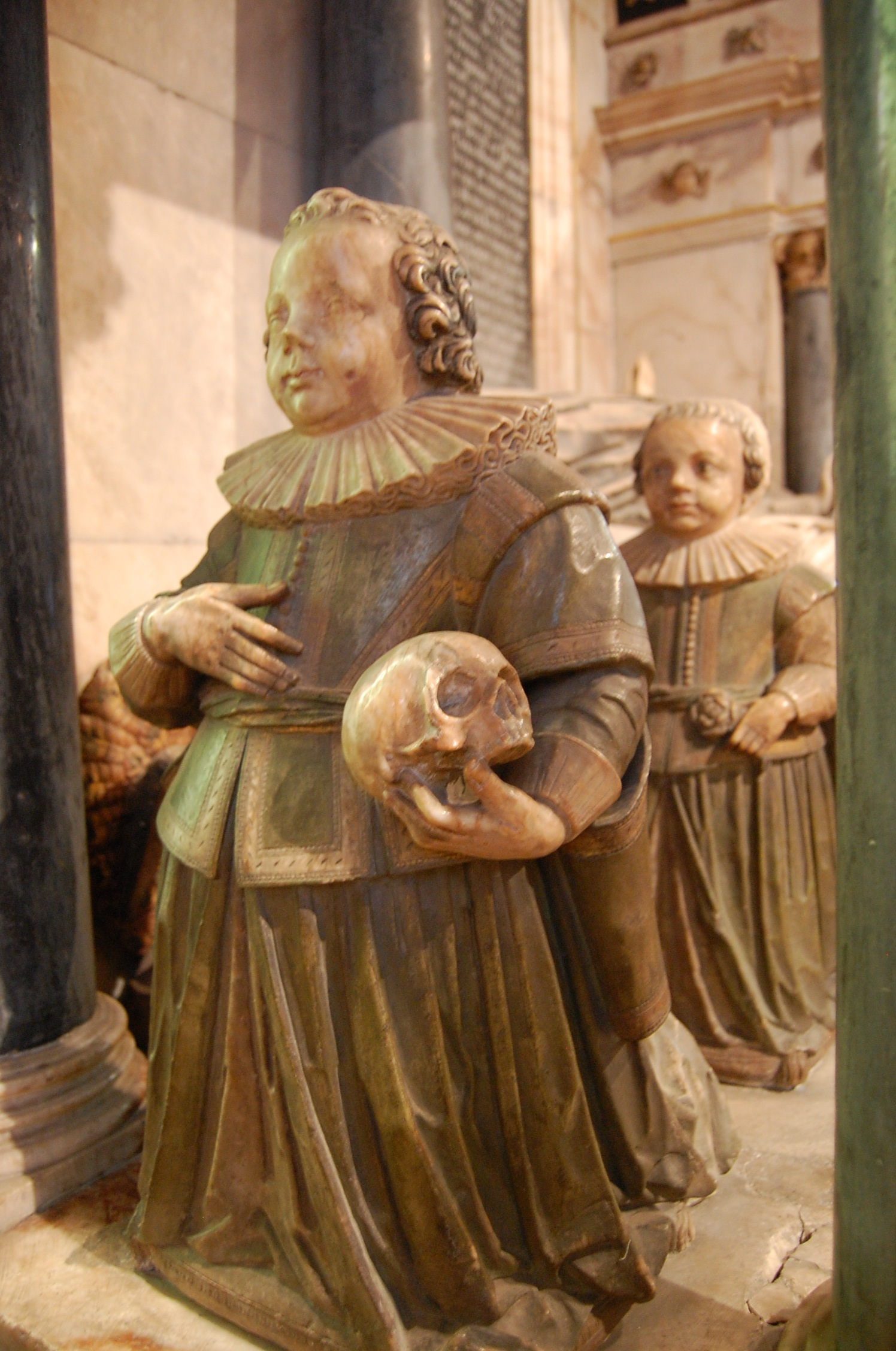
Memorial to Henry and Francis Manners, the heirs to the 6th Earl and Countess of Rutland, whom the Witches of Belvoir were accused of killing

The Witches of Belvoir were a mother and her two daughters in England accused of witchcraft and causing the deaths of two young brothers, Henry (died 1613) and Francis Manners (died 1620), the heirs to Francis Manners, 6th Earl of Rutland, whose seat was at Belvoir Castle. The mother, Joan Flower, died on the way to her trial after apprehension 'around Christmas' of 1618, while Philippa and Margaret were executed by hanging on 11 March 1619.

== The Flowers of Bottesford ==
Joan, Margaret and Philippa Flower were "known to be herbal healers" and came from a local family that "had fallen on hard times". They accepted employment as servants with Francis Manners, 6th Earl of Rutland and his wife Cecily at Belvoir Castle near Grantham, Lincolnshire, when additional staff were needed for an upcoming visit by King James I but the sisters, and their mother, were unpopular with the other staff, and there were suggestions of theft, and misdemeanours. All three were dismissed and only Joan was given a payment of severance amounting to "40 shillings, a bolster (pillow), and a mattress of wool".

After the Flowers were dismissed, the Earl and Countess fell ill, suffering from "vomiting and convulsions". Their son and heir, Henry, Baron de Ros, died, and was buried on 26 September 1613. Their younger children, Francis, and daughter Katherine, suffered similarly and Francis died 7 March 1620. The deaths of the two boys left the Earl without a male heir and Earldom passed to his brother after his own death in 1632.

== Charge of witchcraft ==
Three years after Henry's death, on 16 July 1616, nine women were hanged as witches in Leicestershire for having bewitched a young boy and, in charges similar to those in the Flowers' case, were said to have kept cats as familiars. However it was to be five years after the Flowers' were dismissed from Belvoir Castle, and following persistent illness of their second son, Francis, that the Rutlands had them arrested, before Christmas of 1618. After initial examinations, in February 1619, by the Earl of Rutland, Hon. Robert Bertie, Lord Willoughby de Eresby, Sir George Manners, Sir William Pelham, Sir Henry Hastings, clergyman Samuel Fleming and others, the women were to be taken to Lincoln gaol.

When arrested Joan Flower professed her innocence. She was not known to be a Church-goer, but at Ancaster, en route to the prison at Lincoln, she asked for bread as a substitute for the Eucharist. She claimed that something so blessed could not be consumed by a witch. She choked and died after the first bite.

At Lincoln, Margaret accused her mother of witchcraft, while Phillipa admitted to witchcraft on behalf of herself, Margaret and Joan. The sisters said they had entered into communion with familiar spirits that had assisted them with their schemes. The mother's familiar was a cat named Rutterkin. The women admitted that they stole the glove of Lord Ros and gave it to their mother, who had dipped it in boiling water, stroked it along Rutterkin's back, and pricked it. Combined with some incantations this supposedly caused Lord Ros to become ill and die. An attempt to harm Lady Katherine, the Earl's daughter, had failed when it was found that Rutterkin had no power over her. The women had also taken some feathers from the quilt of Rutland's bed and a pair of gloves. By boiling these in water mixed with blood they cast spells to prevent the Earl and Countess from having any more children. Both women admitted to experiencing visions of devils and that their familiar spirits visited them and sucked at their bodies.

== Others accused ==
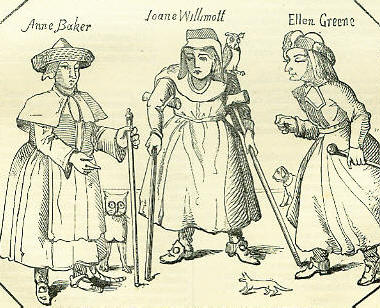
A contemporary sketch of three other women accused: Anne Baker, Joan Willimot & Ellen Greene.

During the examination, they revealed the names of other women who had aided them: Anne Baker of Bottesford; Joan Willimot of Goadby; and Ellen Greene of Stathern.

All three women were taken for examination and revealed that they too had visions and consorted with familiar spirits. Willimot said her familiar was called Pretty and had been blown into her mouth by her former master in the form of a fairy, later reappearing in the form of a woman who asked her to give up her soul. Willimot testified more as a cunning woman than a witch, and insisted Pretty only helped her to inquire about the health of people she had attempted to heal:

She never hurt any body, but did help divers persons that were stricken or fore-spoken (bewitched): and that her Spirit came weekly to her, and would tell of divers persons that were stricken and fore-spoken: and she saith that the use which she had of the Spirit, was to know those did which she had undertaken to amend and she did help them by certain prayers which she used.

Greene claimed that she had accompanied Willimot into a wood where she said Willimot had conjured up two spirits in the form of a kitten and a "moldewarp" (mole) which had climbed on her shoulders and sucked at her ears. Greene sent these familiars to kill a man and woman with whom she had argued and both died within a fortnight. Baker also confessed to possessing a familiar in the form of a white dog, but most of her testimony concerned the visions she had witnessed.

== Aftermath and legacy ==
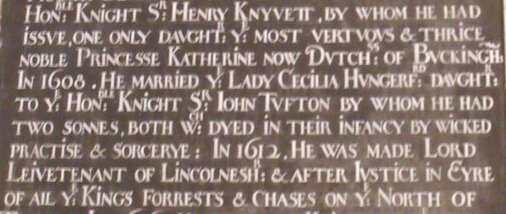
'died in their infancy by wicked practises and sorcerye' – part of the memorial at Bottesford

Margaret and Philippa Flower were tried before Henry Hobart, Lord Chief Justice of the Common Pleas, and Edward Bromley, a Baron of the Exchequer, and found guilty. Margaret and Philippa were hanged at Lincoln castle on 11 March 1619.

Later that year a ballad, Damnable Practises of Three Lincolnshire Witches Joane Flower and Her Two Daughters, printed by 'G. Eld for John Barnes' appeared.

The Earl and Countess remained so convinced that their sons had been killed by the effects of witchcraft that they had it inscribed on their monument at Bottesford church. It reads, in part:

In 1608 he married ye lady Cecila Hungerford, daughter to ye Honorable Knight Sir John Tufton, by whom he had two sons, both of which died in their infancy by wicked practises and sorcerye

In 1953, Hilda Lewis published a historical romance, The Witch and the Priest, which consists of a series of conversations between Samuel Fleming, the clergyman who oversaw the Flowers' examinations, and the ghost of Joan Flower.

In 2013, historian Tracy Borman suggested that the Flower women may have been framed by a favourite of King James I, the Leicestershire born George Villiers, who was created Duke of Buckingham in 1623. Borman's theory is that Villiers had plans to marry the Rutland's daughter Katherine and, with her two brothers dead, inherit the title. Borman argues 'he had them poisoned – then framed Joan Flower and her two daughters as witches to create a smokescreen to cover up his own guilt'. After the execution of the Flower sisters, Villiers went on to marry the Rutland's sole heir Katherine on 16 May 1620.
