= Frances Cecil, Countess of Exeter (died 1663) =

English noblewoman

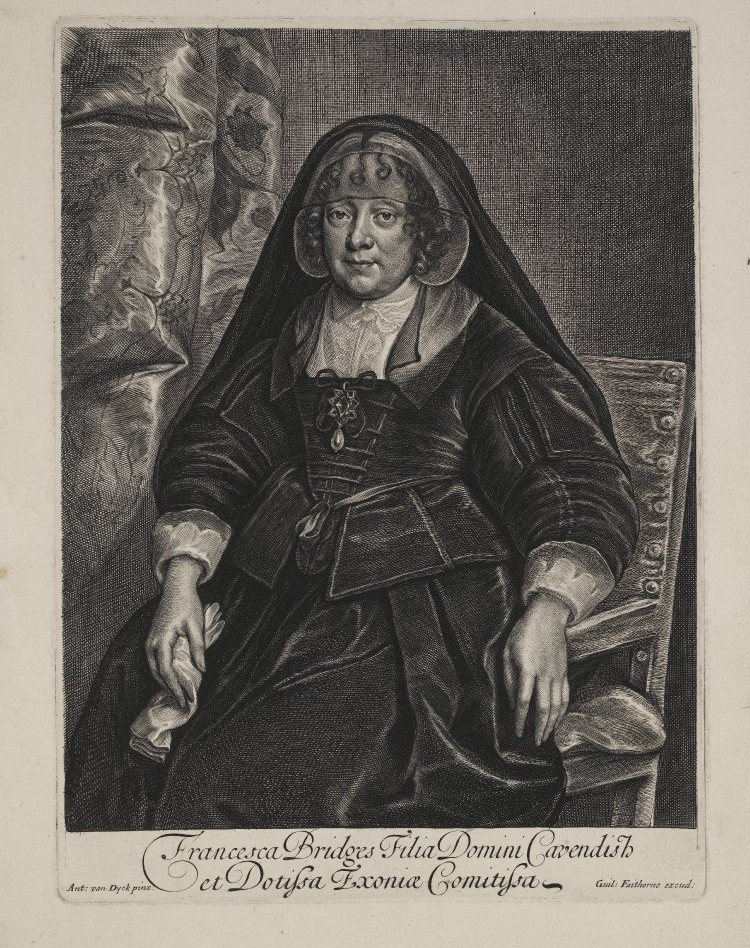
Engraving of Frances, countess of Exeter, after Anthony van Dyck.

Frances Cecil, Countess of Exeter (née Brydges, other married name was Smith; 1580–1663) was an English noblewoman.

Frances was born in 1580, daughter of William Brydges, 4th Baron Chandos (d. 1602), and his wife, Mary (d. 1624). She first married Thomas Smith sometime before 1604, an English judge two decades older than Frances. Smith died in November 1609, leaving Frances with two children to raise: Robert (c1605-1626) and Margaret.

The following year, in late 1610, she married Thomas Cecil, 1st Earl of Exeter, despite being 40 years his junior, younger than most of the earl's children. Poet Ben Jonson praised the marriage in his Gipsies Metamorphos'd (1621), writing "An old man's wife is the light of his life". The couple had a daughter Anne (d. 1621).

During the earl's lifetime, Frances enjoyed great prestige in the English court.The court physician Théodore de Mayerne treated her for melancholy in November 1614. In 1617 the Exeters intervened to protect the interests of his grandson William Cecil, 16th Baron de Ros in his marital dispute with Anne Lake Cecil, Lady Ros. Sir Thomas Lake and his wife accused Frances of adultery with Lord Ros - an accusation which led the Exeters to successfully bring a case in Star Chamber against her accusers.

After a serious illness contracted in late 1622, Thomas died in February 1623. Widowed again, Frances devoted herself to getting her daughter, Margaret, a husband, settling on MP Thomas Carey. In the 1630s, the countess had her portrait painted by Anthony van Dyck. This portrait was lost in the 19th century, surviving in engraved and drawn copies. Frances lived another 30 years, as her daughter was widowed and remarried to Edward Herbert. Cecil died in 1663, between 20 January and 17 July, when her will was signed and probated, respectively. Thomas Cecil reserved a space for her in his monument at Westminster Abbey, but Frances chose instead to have her grave in the floor of Winchester Cathedral.
