= Elizabeth Manners =

Elizabeth Manners may refer to:

- Elizabeth Manners, Duchess of Rutland (1780–1825), English aristocrat
- Elizabeth Cecil, 15th Baroness Ros (c. 1574/75–1591), née Manners
- Elizabeth Manners, née Lovell, wife of Thomas Manners, 1st Earl of Rutland, 1512–1513
