= Ricards Lodge High School =

Location
- Lake Road; Wimbledon, London, SW19 7HB; England
- Coordinates: 51.42866°N 0.20574°W

Information
- Type: Community School
- Motto: "Educating Successful Women of the Future"
- Local authority: Merton
- Department for Education URN: 102673 Tables
- Ofsted: Reports
- Head teacher: Kate Page
- Gender: Girls
- Age: 11 to 18
- Colours: Purple and green
- Website: http://www.ricardslodge.merton.sch.uk

Ricards Lodge High School is a single-sex comprehensive secondary school for girls aged 11 to 16 (with a sixth form, RR6, in collaboration with Rutlish School), located on Lake Road in Wimbledon, London. The school's headteacher has been Kate Page since 2022. It was judged as an Outstanding school by Ofsted in November 2017 and again in November 2023.

== History of the site ==
The manor of Wimbledon was presented to the Archbishop of Canterbury by Edward the Confessor in the 12th century. The property remained in the possession of his successors until the reign of Henry VIII when it was re-possessed by the crown. It was sold again by Queen Elizabeth I to Sir Christopher Hatton, and from him in turn to Sir Thomas Cecil. Queen Elizabeth was not interested in the property whilst it was in her possession but was later entertained there on several occasions.

A new manor house was built in 1588, where today's Arthur Road and Home Park Road meet. The manor was purchased by Sir Theodore Janssen in 1717.

Sir Theodore Janssen was unfortunate enough to be made the scapegoat of Prime Minister Sir Robert Walpole's relief plan and hence stripped of his properties.

Following the confiscation of Janssen's estates, Wimbledon Manor was purchased in 1725 by Sarah, Duchess of Marlborough. The Duchess decided to build herself a new manor house with a northward view. To achieve this, she cleared away completely the remains of the old Cecil manor house. The Duchess died in 1744 and left the estate to the 1st Earl Spencer. John Spencer died in 1783 and was succeeded by his only son, George John. At Easter 1785, the house was burnt down. A new Wimbledon Park House was commissioned from Henry Holland, built between 1795 and 1801 and demolished in 1949.

Both the Marlborough house and the Spencer house stood within the current school playing fields, with the Cecil house just beyond that, at the top of Home Park Road. An underground brick-lined tunnel, which had linked the Duchess' house to her servants' quarters, still exists.

== History of the school ==
The Wimbledon Day Commercial School for girls opened in 1924 and was originally housed in the technical college in Gladstone Road. Girls entered at 14, which was then the minimum school leaving age, followed by a two-year course in business studies and general subjects.

The numbers were limited to 120 girls and under the enthusiastic leadership of the first mistress, Humphrey, the school became so well known all over Surrey that the competition for places became keen.

Humphrey died suddenly in 1930 and the following year Turnbull was appointed in her place and became the youngest headmistress in Surrey, with the smallest school.

In 1934 a one-year course in secretarial work for girls was started along with plans to provide the school with better accommodation. The plans were thwarted by the coming of war. The school was forced to move to limited accommodations in Morden Farm School, then to Morden Junior School, and finally to rooms in the new arts school in Merton Hall Road.

The war years were difficult ones for the school. Some girls left for safer areas, lessons often had to be given in the air raid shelters, and some girls walked miles to get to school. The head girl walked six miles daily. At the end of the war, efforts were made to relocate the school, and Ricards Lodge was found.

Alterations to the school uniform were made and the girls started navy blue jumpers, white shirts, black trousers. This had been the school's colour from the beginning. A red polo shirt, navy blue shorts with initials sowed on. knee high red socks PE shirt was worn until a recent uniform update.

In 1965, the year of the first CSE examinations, Wimbledon became part of the new London borough of Merton, and Surrey County Council ceased to be responsible for education in the area.

In 1975 the school moved into what is now the old part of the current school building, which includes the lodge, the current gym, the manor house and the language department.

The current technology department was added after 1975 but before the "park" block, which is joined by a link and contains the current art, music, drama, and humanities departments.

The new block is composed of two floors, while the old contains four. The two buildings are linked, and two pedestrian walkways one is a sheltered walkway that you go through to the 2 storey building on the ground floor as well as a bridge that joins the second floor corridor.

The school also has a sports hall extended from the old gym as well as joins the main hall and the special needs department continues through to the dining hall but you have to exit the gym building then turn right up the path to the canteen, seven tennis courts, Astroturf and an open field with a huge tree in the middle where sports days were held. The construction of the sixth form meant that two of the tennis courts had to be removed.

Ricards Lodge is a comprehensive arts school, teaching drama, dance and music. The school hosted the regional performances of "Stand up for Shakespeare" in 2009. The cast of "Pericles, Prince of Tyre" went on to perform at the Courtyard Theatre in May 2009. The school has four values: Trust, Equality, Resilience and Aspiration.

Until a few years ago, the (on average) 1200 pupils in the school were split into tutor classes: R, C, A, D, S, L, G and E within different years. However now the tutor groups are called by their year group, the letters spell out the schools name (Ricards Lodge). They are put on sets (R, C, A, D, S, L, G and E) according to their levels.

In their inspection by Ofsted in November 2017, Ricards Lodge was judged to be an Outstanding school.

Co-educational sixth form provision is provided in partnership with Rutlish School for boys, known as RR6. Facilities are split and located at the premises of both schools; students are expected to have a schedule at both schools, with a variation of both courses. This aims to combine both the arts award at Ricards and the specialist maths and ICT skills of Rutlish to give the students a better opportunity at all subjects.

== See also ==
- Ursuline High School
- Raynes Park High School
- Wimbledon Manor House
