= Elizabeth Cecil =

Elizabeth Cecil may refer to:

- Elizabeth Cecil, 15th Baroness Ros
- Elizabeth Cecil, later Elizabeth Hatton
