= William Cecil, 2nd Earl of Exeter =

English nobleman, politician, and peer

The Right Honourable William Cecil PC KG
- Earl of Exeter
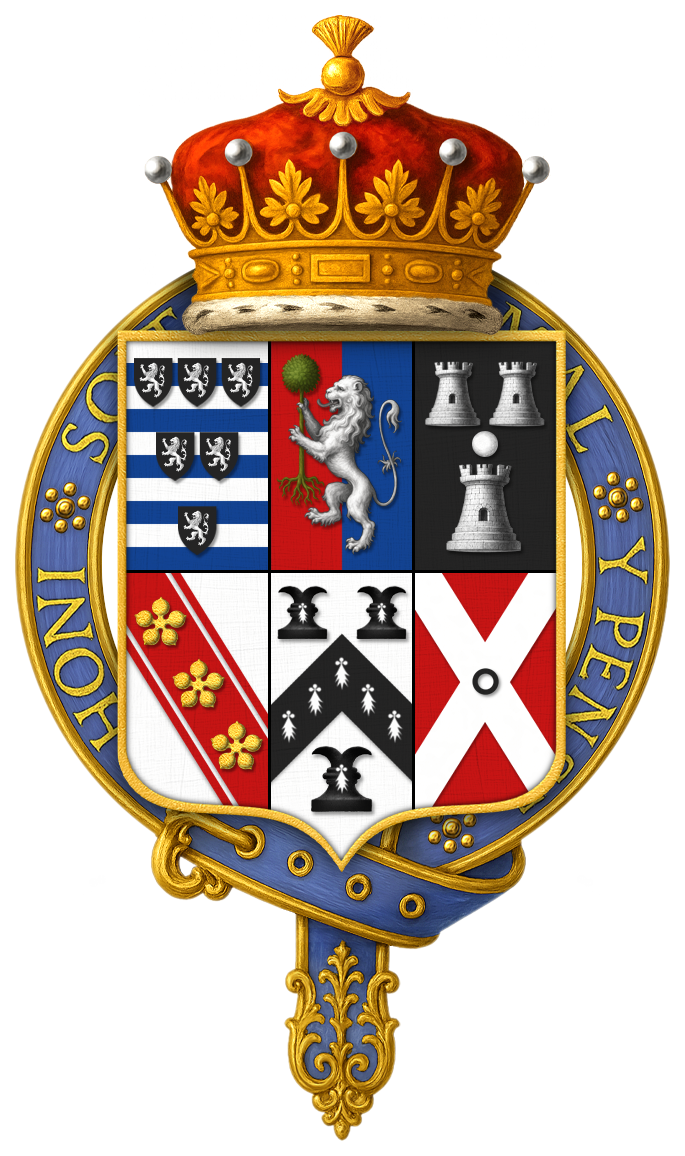
- Coat of arms
- Tenure: 1623–1640
- Predecessor: Thomas Cecil, 1st Earl of Exeter
- Successor: David Cecil, 3rd Earl of Exeter
- Born: 1566
- Died: 6 July 1640 (aged 73–74)
- Spouses: Lady Elizabeth Manners (m. 1589; died 1591): Elizabeth Drury
- Issue: William Cecil, 16th Baron Ros; Lady Anne Cecil; Lady Diana Cecil; Lady Elizabeth Cecil
- Father: Thomas Cecil, 1st Earl of Exeter

William Cecil, 2nd Earl of Exeter PC KG (1566 – 6 July 1640), known as the third Lord Burghley from 1605 to 1623, was an English nobleman, politician, and peer.

== Life ==
Exeter was the son of Thomas Cecil, 1st Earl of Exeter, and Dorothy Neville, daughter of John Neville, 4th Baron Latimer. He was educated at Trinity College, Cambridge, and travelled on the continent before being admitted to Gray's Inn.

In 1586, when only 20 years of age, he was returned to Parliament as burgess for Stamford and was returned again in 1589. In 1597, he was elected knight of the shire for Rutland. He was invested as a Knight Bachelor in 1603. He held the office of Lord-Lieutenant of Northamptonshire between 1623 and 1640. He succeeded to the title of 3rd Baron of Burghley, co. Northampton [E., 1571] on 8 February 1622/23. He succeeded to the title of 2nd Earl of Exeter [E., 1605] on 8 February 1622/23. He was invested as a Privy Counsellor (PC) in 1626. He was invested as a Knight of the Order of the Garter (KG) in 1630.

In 1589, William married Elizabeth Manners, the only child of Edward Manners, 3rd Earl of Rutland, and they had one child:

- William Cecil, 16th Baron Ros, who married Anne Lake Cecil, Lady Ros
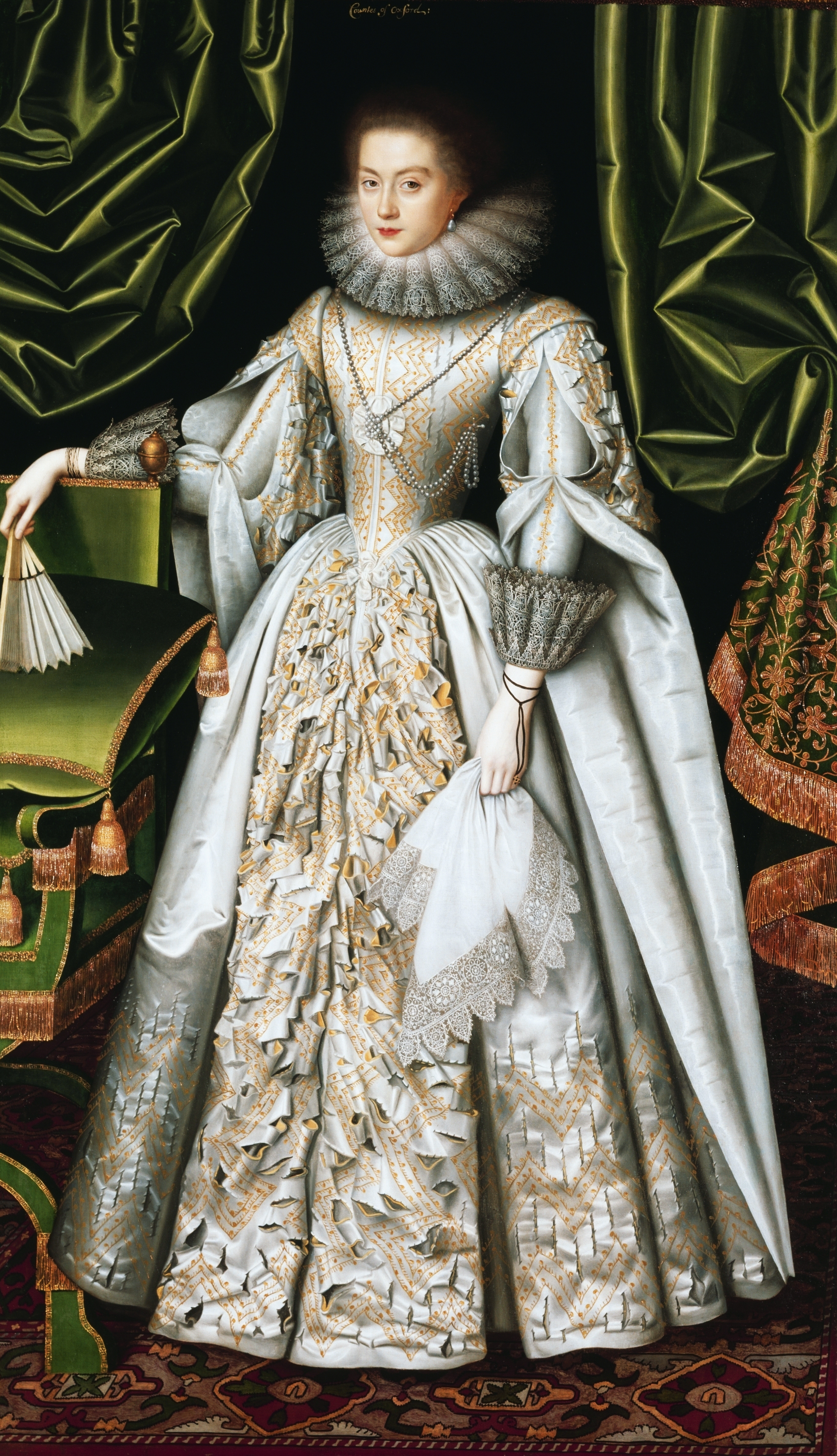
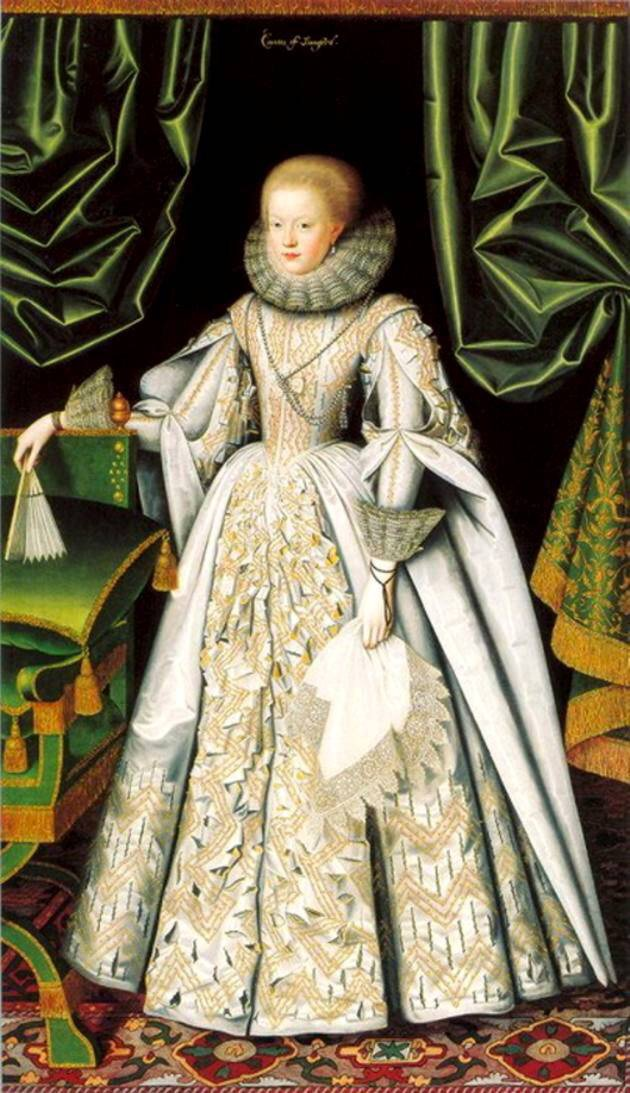
William Cecil's twin daughters Diana and Anne, both paintings by William Larkin, 1615)

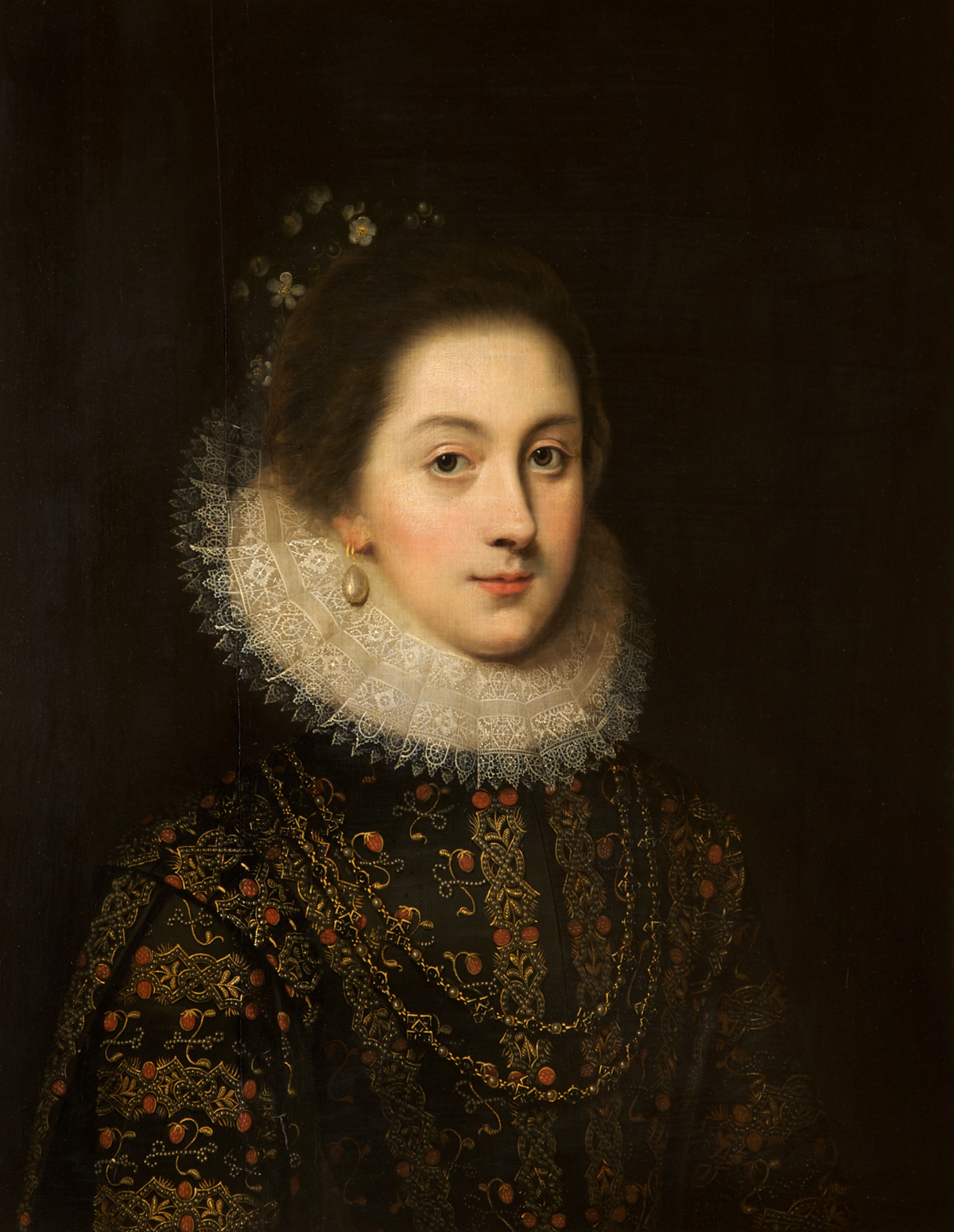
William Cecil's daughter Elizabeth Cecil, by Cornelius Johnson

Elizabeth died in 1591 and William married Elizabeth Drury, daughter of Sir William Drury and Elizabeth Stafford, and they had three daughters:

- Anne Cecil (1596 – ) married Henry Grey, 1st Earl of Stamford, and had issue.
- Diana Cecil (1596 – 1654), married Henry de Vere, 18th Earl of Oxford, no issue, remarried Thomas Bruce, 1st Earl of Elgin, also with no issue.
- Elizabeth Cecil (d. 1672), married Thomas Howard, 1st Earl of Berkshire, and had issue.

Political offices
Preceded by William Sutton	Custos Rotulorum of Nottinghamshire; 1600–1640	Succeeded by The Earl of Newcastle-upon-Tyne
Preceded by The Earl of Exeter	Custos Rotulorum of Lincolnshire bef. 1621–1640	Succeeded by Lord Willoughby de Eresby
Preceded by The Earl of Exeter	Lord Lieutenant of Northamptonshire; 1623–1640	Succeeded by The Earl of Peterborough
Peerage of England
Preceded by Thomas Cecil	Earl of Exeter; 1623–1640	Succeeded by David Cecil
