= Church of St Leonard, Rodney Stoke =

Church in Somerset, England

Church of St Leonard
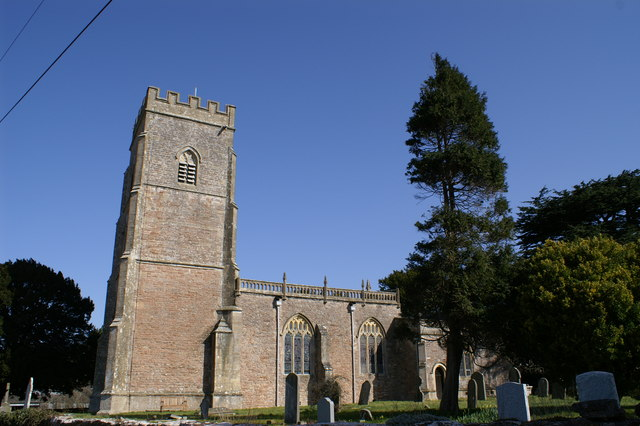

- Location within Somerset

General information
- Location: Rodney Stoke, England
- Coordinates: 51.2449°N 2.7414°W
- Completed: c. 1175

The Church of St Leonard in Rodney Stoke, Somerset, England, was built around 1175 and is a Grade I listed building.

The interior of the church contains a screen, bearing the date 1624, the gift of Sir Edward Rodney, which includes a representation of the martyrdom of St Erasmus, who was killed by having his entrails removed.

The church underwent Victorian restoration in the 1870s when a slow combustion stove was installed in a pit in the floor.

The parish is part of the Rodney Stoke with Draycott benefice which is within the Axbridge deanery.

== Burials ==
- Sir Edward Rodney (1590–1657)
- Anne Rodney (1599–1630)
- Frances Rodney (d. 1659)

== See also ==
- Grade I listed buildings in Mendip
- List of ecclesiastical parishes in the Diocese of Bath and Wells
- List of Somerset towers
