= Wothorpe Towers =

17th-century country house in Cambridgeshire, England

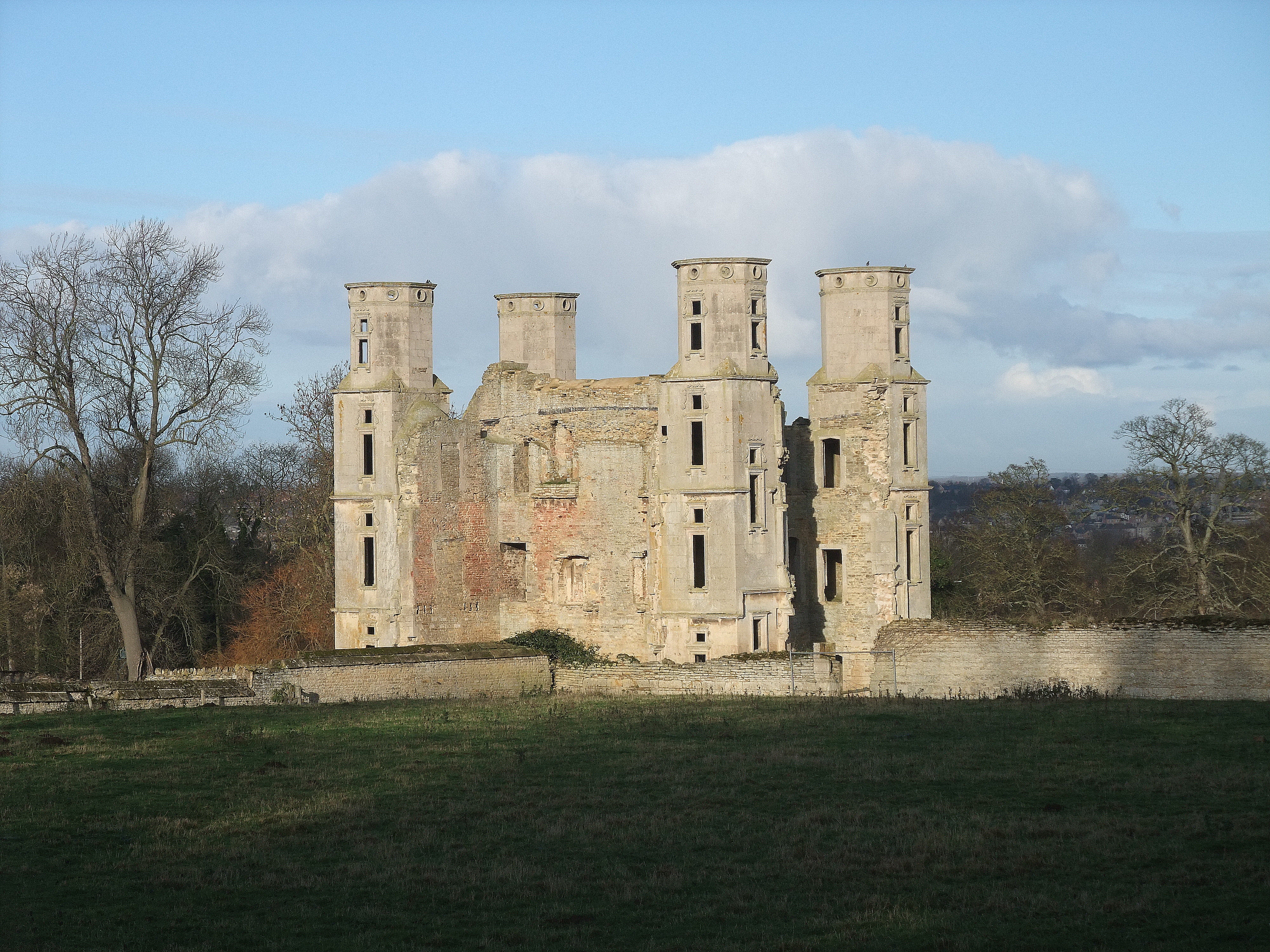
- Wothorpe Towers

- Location within Cambridgeshire

General information
- Type: Country house
- Architectural style: Elizabethan; Jacobean
- Location: Wothorpe, Cambridgeshire
- Coordinates: 52.635412°N 0.486286°W
- Completed: By 1623

Listed Building – Grade I
- Official name: Wothorpe Towers
- Designated: 19 March 1962
- Reference no.: 1265972

Listed Building – Grade I
- Official name: Gateway and Walls
- Designated: 19 March 1962
- Reference no.: 1265972

Wothorpe Towers are the remains of Wothorpe Hall (also known as Wothorpe Lodge), a late-Elizabethan, early-Jacobean country house in Wothorpe, Cambridgeshire, England. Built for the Cecil family in the early 1600s, the house was occupied for 150 years before it was partially demolished, with only the towers and outer walls surviving. Both are Grade I-listed structures with English Heritage. Wothorpe House has been undergoing renovation since the early 21st century; the ruined towers are a scheduled monument and are being preserved.

Wothorpe Towers is about two miles from the town of Stamford, Lincolnshire, and a mile from Burghley House.

== History ==
The lodge was built between 1613 and 1625 for Thomas Cecil, 1st Earl of Exeter, the eldest son of William Cecil, 1st Baron Burghley, Lord High Treasurer to Elizabeth I. It was once part of the Burghley House estate and as such was eclipsed by the famous seat of the Cecil family. According to Thomas Fuller, Exeter built Wothorpe Towers as a lodge "to retire to out of the dust while his great house was a sweeping". Little else was recorded of its history. William Camden referred to it as a "handsome seat" surrounded by a "little park wall'd about", but there were no contemporary reports detailing its interior.

After Exeter's death, the Towers were leased to the Duke of Buckingham. From 1755–65, it was used as a dower house for Hannah Cecil, the Dowager Countess of Exeter. The house was eventually partly demolished, and many of its stones were reused for an eyecatcher in the newly landscaped Burghley park.

Wothorpe Towers fell to ruins and were on English Heritage's Buildings at Risk Register. In 2004, they were purchased by barristers Janet and Paul Griffin, who began the process of restoration and preservation. The work done so far led to Wothorpe Towers being removed from the At-Risk Register.

In 2010, the site was formally opened to members of the public for the first time in its history.

== Architecture ==
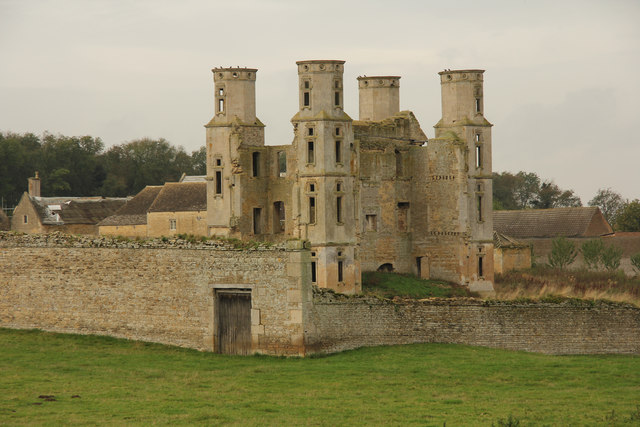
Wothorpe Towers and its outer walls are both Grade I-listed.

At the cusp of Elizabethan and Jacobean architecture, Wothorpe Towers exhibits "the gradual hardening process that changed the free and light-hearted treatment of Elizabeth's time into the more formal and laboured work of the middle and end of the 17th century."

Constructed of ashlar, the cruciform-shaped lodge consist of a central three-storey block with four square four-storey angle towers. The towers are octagonal with circular openings in the parapets, and the stone ogee roofs no longer remain. The towers have tall rectangular window openings under moulded architraves, as well as small square over-windows with cornices and flat volute decorations.

The tower block is partially enclosed by the listed gateway and stone walls, which rise to about 18 ft in height at the south-east end. The ashlar gateway has a moulded architrave, cornice, and high-stepped gable with oval and circular openings.

== Filming location ==
Wothorpe Towers was used as a filming location for an episode of Doctor Who in the 1980s.

== See also ==
- Grade I listed buildings in Cambridgeshire
- Burghley House
