= Custos Rotulorum of Nottinghamshire =

This is a list of people who have served as Custos Rotulorum of Nottinghamshire.

- Michael Stanhope bef. 1544–1552
- Sir John Byron, Sr. by 1562–1567.
- Edward Manners, 3rd Earl of Rutland bef. 1573–1587
- John Manners, 4th Earl of Rutland 1587–1588
- Sir Thomas Stanhope bef. 1594–1596
- William Sutton 1597–1600
- William Cecil, 2nd Earl of Exeter 1600–1640
- William Cavendish, 1st Duke of Newcastle-upon-Tyne 1640–1646
- Interregnum
- William Cavendish, 1st Duke of Newcastle-upon-Tyne 1660–1676
- Henry Cavendish, 2nd Duke of Newcastle-upon-Tyne 1677–1688
- William Pierrepont, 4th Earl of Kingston-upon-Hull 1689–1690
- vacant
- John Holles, 1st Duke of Newcastle-upon-Tyne 1694–1711

For later custodes rotulorum, see Lord Lieutenant of Nottinghamshire.
