= Thomas Smith (judge, died 1609) =

- Born: c.1556 Abingdon
- Died: 1609; Fulham, London

Sir Thomas Smith (c.1556–1609), was the English master of requests.

== Family and identity ==
Smith was born at Abingdon in Berkshire (now Oxfordshire), about 1556. He was the son of Thomas Smith, who is almost certainly to be identified with the Thomas Smith who was Mayor of Abingdon in 1584. He must be distinguished from Sir Thomas Smith or Smythe (c.1558–1625), governor of the East India Company, and from the latter's father, Thomas Smythe (d. 1591), "customer" of the port of London.

== Education ==
He was educated at John Roysse's Free School in Abingdon (now Abingdon School) and at Christ Church, Oxford, where he was elected student in 1573, graduated B.A. in December 1574, and M.A. in June 1578. He was chosen public orator on 9 April 1582, and proctor on 29 April 1584.

== Career ==
Soon afterwards he became secretary to Robert Devereux, second earl of Essex, and in 1587 was appointed clerk of the privy council. In December 1591 he wrote to Cecil urging Essex's claims to the chancellorship of Oxford University. He represented Cricklade in the parliament of 1588–9, Tamworth in that of 1593, and Aylesbury in that of 1597–8. On 30 September 1597 he received a grant of the clerkship of parliament, in succession to Anthony Wyckes, alias Mason. He kept aloof from Essex's intrigues, and on 29 November 1599 was sent by the lords to summon the earl before the privy council. On the accession of James I he received further promotion, perhaps owing to his friendship with Carleton, Edmondes, Winwood, and Bacon. He was knighted at Greenwich on 20 May 1603, and in the following month was granted the Latin secretaryship for life, and the reversion to the secretaryship of the council of the north. On 8 June 1604 he obtained the manor of Wing, Rutland, and in 1608 he was made master of requests. On 20 May in the same year he received a pension of £100.

== Death and descendants ==
He died on 27 November 1609 at his residence (afterwards called Peterborough House) at Parsons Green, near Fulham, in Middlesex and was buried on 7 December in the chancel of Fulham parish church, where a monument, with an inscription to his memory, is extant. He married Frances (1580–1663), daughter of William Brydges, 4th Baron Chandos, and sister of Grey Brydges, 5th Baron Chandos. His only son, Robert, died a minor, and his only daughter, Margaret, married Thomas, second son of Robert Carey, 1st Earl of Monmouth. Smith's widow married Thomas Cecil, 1st Earl of Exeter, and survived until 1663. By his will, dated 12 September 1609, Smith left £100 to the poor of Abingdon, and a similar sum to the Bodleian Library.

== See also ==
- List of Old Abingdonians
