= Thomas Lake =

English politician

Sir Thomas Lake PC (1567 – 17 September 1630) was Secretary of State to James I of England. He was a Member of Parliament between 1593 and 1626.

Thomas Lake was baptised in Southampton on 11 October 1567, the son of Almeric Lake, a minor customs official: his obscure birth was a source of much unkind comment by his enemies throughout his life. Arthur Lake, Bishop of Bath and Wells, was his older brother.

He attended King Edward VI School, Southampton as a day boy. This meant that he did not have the level of French language tuition accorded to boarders by his Belgian schoolmaster Adrian Saravia, which was a source of regret to him in later life. He did, however, gain excellent fluency in Latin.

== Career ==
He was an MP for Malmesbury in 1593, New Romney in 1601, Launceston in 1604, Middlesex in 1614 and Wootton Bassett in 1626.

He became the personal secretary of Sir Francis Walsingham, the Secretary of State, and was nicknamed 'Swiftsure' for his speed and accuracy. Walsingham brought Lake to the attention of Queen Elizabeth I and he was appointed Clerk of the Signet in 1600. As one of the Queen's favourites, he travelled with her reading Latin texts to her on her progresses around the country.

On 28 March 1603, four days after the death of Elizabeth I of England the Privy Council sent him to Scotland with George Carew to inform James I of the current state of affairs and reiterate their urgent desire that the King should come to England. He was a protégé of the Howard family and became a favourite of James, who appointed him Secretary of the Latin Tongue and Keeper of the Records and then knighted him in 1603.

He acted as the King's travelling secretary just as he had for Walsingham. His brother Arthur was one of the translators of the King James Bible appointed in 1604 — the year that the reversion of Great Stanmore Manor in Middlesex was granted to Lake, although it seems that he never took possession for the lordship remained in the name of the Burnell family until his son Thomas assumed possession in 1631. At the adjoining manor of Little Stanmore he built a grand brick mansion called Cannons to a design ascribed to John Thorpe (the house was rebuilt in the 18th century by the Duke of Chandos).

Bribery was endemic at the time and Lake's position with the King made him a target for many bribes (the Bishop of Llandaff offered Lake £80 for his help in securing a position) but he was not averse to bribery on his own behalf. When Lord Salisbury, Walsingham's successor as Secretary of State, died in 1612, Lake desperately wanted the job and tried to bribe his way into it but James would not appoint Lake immediately and filled the post himself for a time.

It was also in 1612 that Lake came to regret not having boarded at his school, which would have enabled him to profit from the headmaster's tutorials in French. The King's daughter, Princess Elizabeth was betrothed to a German prince, Frederick V of the Palatinate, and Lake was chosen to read the marriage contract aloud. It was written in French and his accent was so bad and his translation into English so inept that he made a fool of himself. It did not do lasting harm to his career, however.

On 29 March 1615, Lake was taken into the Privy Council and, on 3 January 1615/16, James swore him in as one of the two principal royal secretaries so that both he and Sir Ralph Winwood were Secretary of State.

== Scandal and the Secretary of State ==
Lake's discretion was not always to be relied on. In 1619 he relayed to the Earl of Suffolk remarks that the King had made to him privately about Suffolk's wife, Katherine Knyvet. The King was gravely displeased, and Lake offered the Marquess of Buckingham, the King's favourite £15,000 to help him regain the King's friendship. Buckingham refused but later yielded to Lake's pleas.

=== The Roos affair ===
Ultimately, Lake's career was nearly ruined by his involvement in a bitter family quarrel. On 12 February 1616/17, Lake's eldest child, Anne, was married to William Cecil, 16th Baron de Ros, but the marriage did not last. During the marriage, Cecil had mortgaged some of his land to Lake and following the divorce Lake claimed this for his daughter. Cecil's grandfather, Thomas Cecil, 1st Earl of Exeter, contested the request and a vicious dispute ensued.

Lake's eldest son, Sir Arthur Lake, violently attacked Cecil. Lake's wife and daughter then threatened to accuse Cecil of having an affair with his grandfather's young second wife. This charge was entirely false but when Cecil fled to Rome, Anne Lake forged incriminating letters. Lady Exeter charged Lake, his wife, his son and his daughter with defamation of character. Anne was accused of "precontracts, adultery, incest, murder, poison" against her husband, Lord Roos. As part of the legal action, Lake and his wife submitted a bill to the Star Chamber, which was defended by Lord Roos who counter-sued with a bill submitted by his grandfather, the Earl of Exeter.

On 14 February 1617/18, the King expressed his annoyance with Lake because of Lady Roos' slanders against Frances, Countess of Exeter. On 22 February, Lady Roos was committed into the Bishop of London's custody, her maid to the custody of Edmund Doubleday, and Thomas Lake's attorney and Luke Hutton were imprisoned. Lady Roos was freed on 5 March.

King James chose to judge the case in person, adjudicating the trial in the Star Chamber in two morning sessions on 3 and 5 February 1619/20. The King found them all guilty, although he found Lake himself guilty of less serious crimes than the others. The King and the Lords in the Star Chamber passed sentence on 13 February 1619/20. Huge fines exceeding £10,000 were imposed upon the family and two days later Lake, his wife, and Lady Roos his daughter were consigned to the Tower. The fines were almost all due to the Crown and little compensation was offered to Lady Exeter. Lake also had to surrender his seal and public documents. One of his duties, while confined to the tower, was the chopping of wood.

On 21 April, Lake's son and secretary William was put in custody because he attempted to pass secret letters to Lady Roos and tried to escape when accosted and on 3 June Arthur Lake was placed in custody having published a slanderous pamphlet. But the misbehaviour was not confined to the Lakes: Parker, Clerk of the Star Chamber, was also incarcerated on 3 June for acting in bad faith in examining Lady Roos.

On 19 June, Lake was brought back to the Star Chamber and told that he must make a public confession that the sentence brought against him was just, and that he had inflicted an injury upon the Countess of Exeter. He pleaded not guilty; so too did his wife, even though their daughter had confessed that her slanders about incest with Lady Roos, poisoning, and requests for forgiveness for crimes were inventions written by Arthur Lake and copied by Hobbie, Lady Roos' maid, with her father and mother accomplices. The King considered this to be the height of contempt against his Royal Majesty but a month later he agreed to free Lake from prison and put him in the custody of his brother Arthur, Bishop of Bath and Wells. Lake's daughter was also freed. Lake did not leave the Tower immediately; he chose to stay there a while longer to arrange his private affairs.

On 28 January 1620/21, back in the Star Chamber Lake read out an acknowledgement of the slanders by which he had done damage to the Countess of Exeter. This acknowledgement or act of submission was devised by the Lord Chancellor, Chief Justices, and Attorney General. In this,

for the defence and support of Lady Roos his daughter, he acknowledged that the sentence handed down against him on the preceding 13 February, was just, because his fault was disgraceful, hateful, and scandalous to the said Countess. But he was misled by his great credulilty, indulgence, and ignorance. Furthermore he acknowledged that he had erred in incarcerating Luke Hutton on 22 February 1618 and George Williams out of self-interest, and professed that it grieved him to his heart to have defended such a disgraceful, hateful, and scandalous case. Begging the Countess' forgiveness, he sincerely petitioned the Lords to intercede with the King for favour and mercy.

Intriguingly, on 22 February, William Camden notes in his diary that: "Peacock of Cambridge, who had claimed he had employed magical tricks to sway the King's mind from sound judgement in the case of Thomas Lake, is put to torture in the Tower of London. Some pronounced him a madman, others an impostor."

On 10 March, Lake's wife was temporarily freed from the Tower "because of her ill health, under the condition that at the beginning of term she be returned unless she has made her submission". Lake finally kissed the royal hand on 15 May but his wife stubbornly refused to make her submission and remained in the Tower after his release. She was still there on 27 September when Lake was struck by a vehicle and broke his arm and on 16 November when she was to be brought to the Star Chamber to acknowledge her offence against the Countess of Exeter, "she wrote a letter to her derogatory to the kingdom's justice, and, quoting verses from Psalm 136, summoned the Countess to Divine Judgement," and hence was returned to the Tower. A month later on 14 December, she was freed from prison without public explanation.

== Later life ==
Lake did not return to his post as Secretary of State but he and the King were reconciled and he was readmitted to Court. In 1625, he was elected MP for Wells and, in 1626, he became MP for Wooton, which position he until his death on 17 September 1630.

He was survived by his widow, Mary (daughter of Sir William Ryder, Lord Mayor of London, and a first cousin of John Ryder, Anglican Bishop of Killaloe), three sons, Arthur (died 1633), Thomas (died 1653) and Lancelot (died 1680), and four daughters, including Lady Roos (who had remarried George Rodney) and Bridget, who married Sir William Domville, Attorney General for Ireland, in 1637.

== Arms ==
Coat of arms of Thomas Lake
Notes Recorded at the Visitation of London in 1568. Escutcheon Quarterly 1st & 4th Sable on a bend between six crosses crosslet fitché Argent a mullet of the field 2nd & 3rd quarterly Argent and Sable on a bend Gules three mullets Argent a martlet Or for difference.

== Bibliography ==
- Baker, T. F. T. (1976). A History of the County of Middlesex. Vol. V. London: Victoria County History.
- McClure, N. E. (1939). John Chamberlain – Letters. Vol. 2 vols. Philadelphia: American Philosophical Society.
- Sutton, Dana F. "William Camden's Diary (1603-1623)".

Political offices
Preceded by Sir John Fortescue	Custos Rotulorum of Middlesex bef. 1608–1619	Succeeded by Sir Thomas Edmondes
Preceded by John Herbert; Sir Ralph Winwood	Secretary of State; 1616–1619; With: Sir Ralph Winwood 1616–1617; Sir Robert Naunton 1618–1619	Succeeded by Sir Robert Naunton; Sir George Calvert
