= Wothorpe =

Village in Cambridgeshire, England

Coordinates: 52.643°N 0.483°W

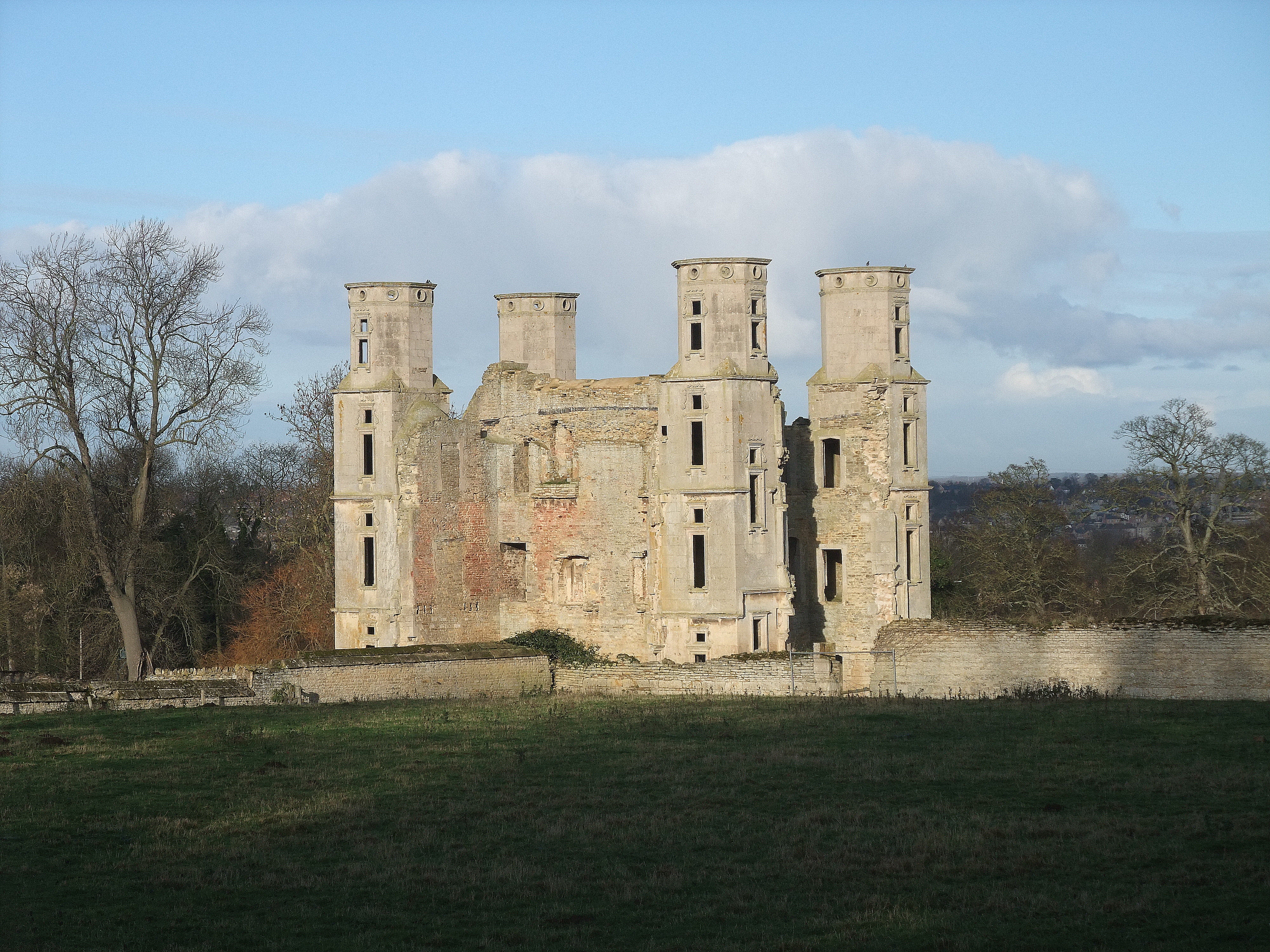
- Wothorpe Towers

- Location within Cambridgeshire
- Population: 226 (2001 census)
- Unitary authority: Peterborough
- Ceremonial county: Cambridgeshire
- Region: East
- Country: England
- Sovereign state: United Kingdom
- Post town: STAMFORD
- Postcode district: PE9
- Dialling code: 01780

Wothorpe is a village and civil parish in the Peterborough unitary authority of Cambridgeshire, England. It is in the far north-west of the district, and to the south of Stamford (in Lincolnshire). The parish borders Northamptonshire to the west.

== Overview ==
Wothorpe Priory was a "small Benedictine nunnery", founded apparently around 1160. All but one of the nuns died in the outbreak of Plague in 1349, with the survivor becoming part of the Priory of St Michael in Stamford. The property was dissolved by Henry VIII, being granted to Richard Cecil.

As a parish, it was considered a hamlet within the parish of Stamford Baron, becoming a separate civil parish once more in 1866. Historically the parish was part of the Soke of Peterborough, associated with Northamptonshire. Administratively, it became part of the Stamford rural sanitary district in the 19th century, then later the Barnack Rural District of the administrative county of the Soke, then passing to Huntingdon and Peterborough in 1965 and Cambridgeshire in 1974 under the Local Government Act 1972.

Wothorpe Towers (also Wothorpe Lodge) is a Grade I listed building. The early-17th-century lodge was once part of the Burghley House estate, built by Thomas Cecil, 1st Earl of Exeter, eldest son of William Cecil, 1st Baron Burghley. After Thomas' death, the Towers were leased to George Villiers, 2nd Duke of Buckingham, then used as a dower house and finally, part dismantled to provide an eye-catcher in the newly landscaped Burghley park. The historic site including the Towers was purchased from the Burghley House Preservation Trust in 2004 by Janet and Paul Griffin; a programme of repair and consolidation of the Towers has been carried out by them, resulting in the building's removal from the Heritage at Risk Register in 2008. They established, and are trustees of, the Wothorpe Towers Preservation Trust, to which they have gifted the Towers structure. Together, they are responsible for the future care and upkeep of the building, which now stands as a consolidated monument within the grounds of the site owned and occupied by the Griffins as a private residence.

Wothorpe Farmhouse and barn remain on the Heritage at Risk Register. Both are Grade II* listed.

The former grandstand (1766) of the Stamford Racecourse is now also Grade II* listed. It was restored for residential use in 1997.

=== Racecourse road ===
Within the parish of Wothorpe is the highest point of the historic Soke of Peterborough. The high point of 81 metres (266 ft) is located on Racecourse Road at TF 0353 0417, next to the county boundary with Northamptonshire. Although unmarked, the summit is of interest to participants in hill bagging who visit these high points of the historic counties of England.

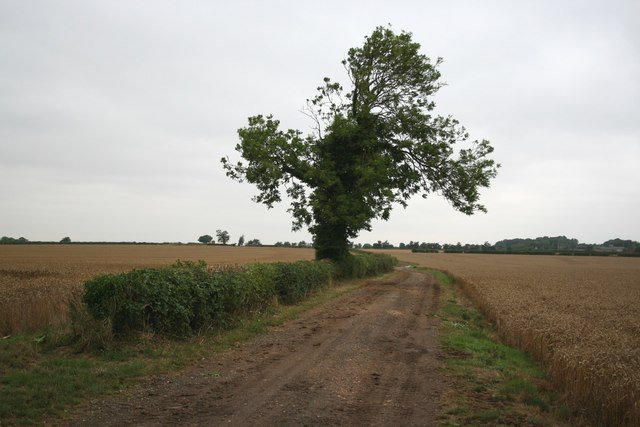
The county boundary near Racecourse Road
