= Wimbledon Manor House =

- Location in London
- 51°25′46.3512″N 0°12′31.8204″W
- Location: Wimbledon Park, London, SW19

History
- Founded: c.1328
- Built: c.1500
- Built for: The Church of England, Sir Thomas Cecil, Sir Theodore Janssen, Sarah Churchill, Duchess of Marlborough, George John Spencer, 2nd Earl Spencer
- Demolished: C.1725,1785,1900,1949
- Rebuilt: 1588, 1720, 1733, 1801

Site notes
- Architect(s): Colen Campbell, Henry Herbert, Henry Holland
- Architectural styles: Tudor, Elizabethan, Palladian, Regency

Wimbledon manor house, the residence of the lord of the manor, was an English country house at Wimbledon, Surrey, now part of Greater London. The manor house was over the centuries exploded, burnt and several times demolished. The first known manor house, The Old Rectory was built around 1500 still stands as a private home, despite very nearly falling into a state beyond repair, in the 19th century. The ambitious later Elizabethan prodigy house, Wimbledon Palace, was "a house of the first importance" according to Sir John Summerson, and is now demolished. The approach road can be traced today with the current treeline.

The manor house passed through several further iterations, being entirely rebuilt three times. From the 18th Century onwards the manor lands began to reduce in size as various owners sold off parts. What was known as the 'Old Park', an area of around 300 acres stretching westwards from the present Cannizaro House (now a hotel) and public park, was sold off in 1705. Most of the present day Wimbledon Common was also once part of the manor, with grazing rights given to tenants of the lord of the manor.

The Common was saved from enclosure and development in 1871 by a remarkably early act of conservation. 42 acres, previously part of the manor parklands, are now occupied by the All England Lawn Tennis and Croquet Club that has made Wimbledon synonymous with tennis. Further tracts of the Grade II* listed public Wimbledon Park include its present-day golf course and the lake, the latter created along with further improvements to the park by the famous landscaper 'Capability' Brown for John Spencer, 1st Earl Spencer, in 1768.

== Early history ==
Until 1328, Wimbledon manor formed part of the manor of Mortlake. In 1364, Simon Islip, the Archbishop of Canterbury, gave the demesne lands to Merton Priory. Wimbledon was among the possessions of the church forfeited by Thomas Arundel, Archbishop of Canterbury, in 1397. On the accession of Henry IV, Arundel was restored, and the archbishops continued to hold the manor of Wimbledon until 1536, when Thomas Cranmer, then archbishop, handed the manor and advowson to Henry VIII, as part of the Reformation and the Dissolution of the Monasteries, who then granted them to Thomas Cromwell. In 1540, Wimbledon manor was taken back from Cromwell on his death by the crown and annexed to Hampton Court. Henry VIII gave it to his queen, Catherine Parr, in 1543. After her death in 1548 the manor remained in the Crown until 1556, when Queen Mary granted it to Cardinal Reginald Pole as part of the Counter Reformation. Queen Elizabeth I seized it back and gave it to Sir Christopher Hatton in 1576 who sold it to Sir Thomas Cecil the same year .

== The Old Rectory ==
The Old Rectory, formerly The Parsonage. Built early 1500s. C. 1952

The Old Rectory, Wimbledon's first known manor house and its oldest surviving residence, originally known as the Parsonage House, was commissioned by the church in the early 1500s and is Grade II* listed. The house was once moated, and adjoins the grounds of St Mary's Church. After the Dissolution of the Monasteries the former rectory manor and its "Parsonage" or "Rectory" house, compulsorily purchased from the church and vested in the Lord Chancellor, Thomas Cromwell, in 1536, were on his downfall in 1540 seized by Henry VIII who gave them to his sixth and last wife Catherine Parr in 1543. On 20 December 1546, in the months prior to his death, during a tour of his Surrey estates, the King was overcome by his various ailments and was unable to continue on to his Palace at Whitehall, so he stopped for three days at Catherine's house. In 1550, the house became a grace and favour home for William Cecil, 1st Baron Burghley. Described by one of Cecil's biographers as "not luxurious, but adequate", a survey from 1649 describes The Old Rectory as "A two storey house with a large dining hall, a withdrawing chamber, a parlour and little chamber, and extensive service quarters. A spiral staircase to the first floor with ten chambers and five closets, with five garrets in the roof".

By 1720, it was known as The Old Laundry House, presumably for the Cecil house built in 1588, next door (see below). The house was uninhabited when Sir Theodore Janssen bought the manor in 1717 (see below) and who allegedly pulled down the south wing and restored the remainder of the house. By 1861, the house was a near ruin when it was sold as part of Wimbledon Park (but not the manor), by Frederick Spencer, 4th Earl Spencer, to the developer, John Beaumont (see below). Beaumont restored and extended The Old Rectory, repaired the exterior, transformed the interior, laid out the grounds and planted the famous fig walk. His successor, Samuel Willson, who bought the house for £6,000 in 1882, carried on the works, adding two-storey drawing-room wing and installing carved-oak doors and English, Flemish and Italian chimney pieces. In 1909 the house was purchased by marine engineer Matthias Jacobs, who enlarged it considerably with help from his brother, an architect, who designed a new single-storey billiard room, a large service wing to the north and a study extension to mask the chapel. In 1923, Thomas Lethaby purchased the house and he concentrated on embellishing the interior. The drawing room was fitted with oak panelling from the Chantry House, Newark, an elaborate plaster ceiling based on one at Knole House, and a grand fireplace.

The Old Rectory, Wimbledon, c. 1860 by Charles Mileham (1837 – 1917)

The Lethabys sold the house in 1947. In 1953, Russell Brock, later Baron Brock of Wimbledon, an eminent cardiologist, bought the house for £13,750. The Brock family sold it in 1978 and the kitchen garden was sold and developed for housing known today as Rectory Orchard. The Old Rectory was then bought by an Iraqi entrepreneur and philanthropist, Basil Faidhi. Faidhi had fled Iraq for Britain and though he spent vast sums restoring the house with assistance from English Heritage, he also created a basement discothèque for his daughter, Nina, and a bar. In 1992 Faidhi commissioned Wimbledon historian Richard Milward to write a history of the building: The Rectory – Wimbledon’s Oldest House.

In 1994, the astrophysicist, songwriter and lead guitarist of the rock band Queen, Brian May, paid £4 million for the house, with the intention of living there with his partner and later wife, the long-running BBC TV soap opera EastEnders actress Anita Dobson. In 2006 May sold The Old Rectory for £16 million to an Italian architect-owner Antonella Carminati and her husband, who initiated further works with the help of the architect Sir Donald Insall. In 2012, the Carminatis put The Old Rectory on the market for £26 million. The house standing in 2 1/2 acres, was sold in June 2013 for an undisclosed sum to Ian Taylor.

== Cecil Wimbledon ==
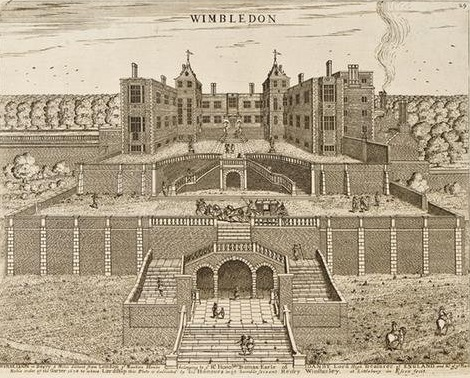
Wimbledon Palace. North front. Built 1588. Etching by Henry Winstanley 1678 for Lord Danby.

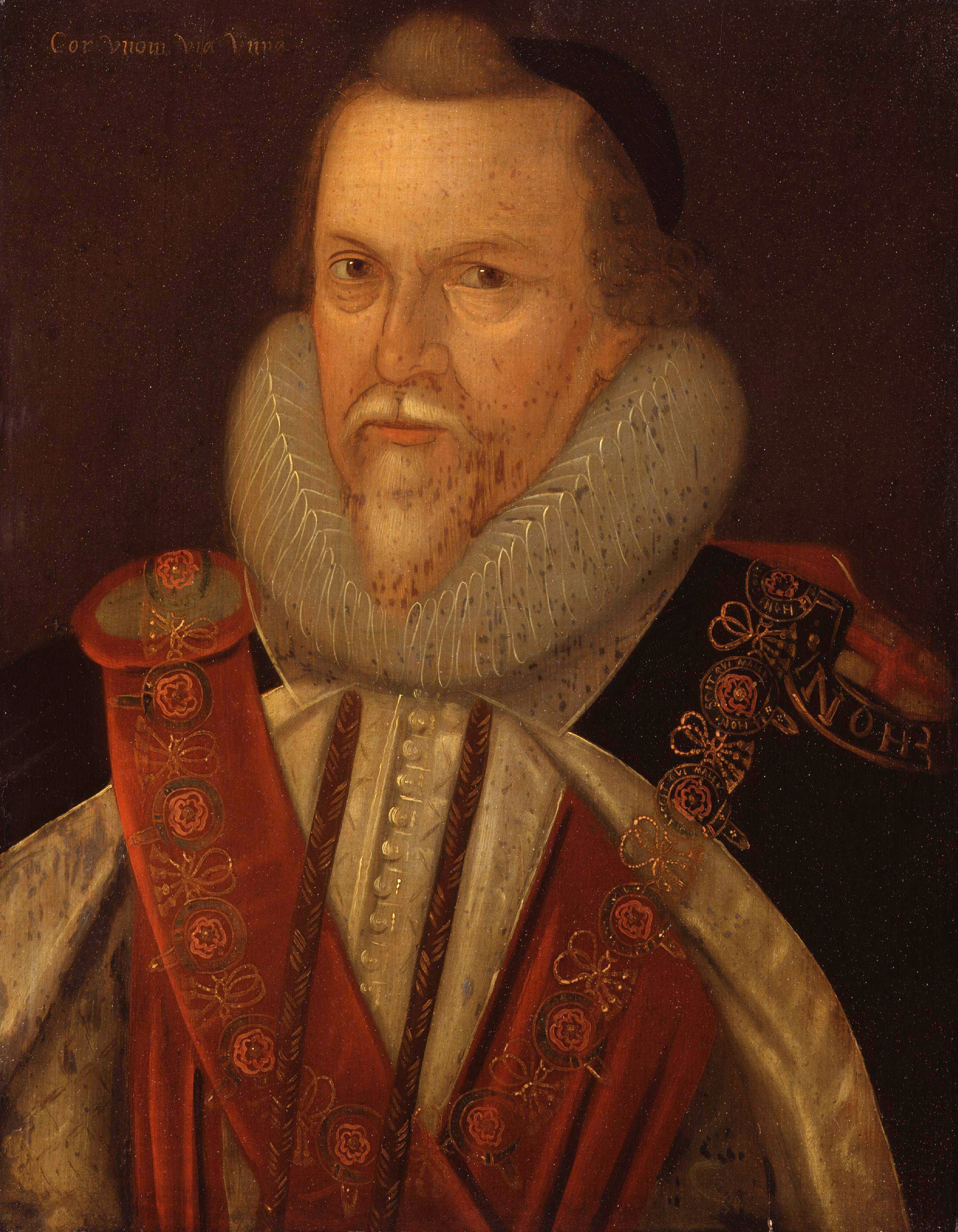
Sir Thomas Cecil (1542–1623)

Sir Thomas Cecil, later Earl of Exeter, had connections with Wimbledon manor, before he bought it in 1576, for he had lived there when he was a child, in The Old Rectory. His father, William Cecil, 1st Baron Burghley, had tenure of the house as a grace-and-favor residence by the Crown. Whilst Sir Thomas did own The Old Rectory, as it came as part of the manor, he decided to build a grand new Wimbledon manor house which was to be known as Wimbledon Palace. This was built next door to The Old Rectory and completed in 1588, England's Annus Mirabilis. It was a leading example of the Elizabethan prodigy house. Sir Thomas' son Edward Cecil was made 1st Viscount Wimbledon on the basis of this seat. Edward's sarcophagus sits within the Cecil chapel at St Mary's Church, Wimbledon, near the site of his demolished home.

The site, which was near the village of Wimbledon, was near the top of a high hill, astride the upper part of what is now Home Park Road, with extensive views northwards over the present day Wimbledon Park, above a steep slope that was dramatically terraced with massive retaining walls. The house was built on a modified H plan, with a slightly recessed central range facing south, and on the north, a central entrance between deep flanking wings, with matching staircase towers in the inner corners. An informally arranged service wing, not part of the symmetrical design, lay to the west. The entrance court, essentially a deep gated terrace entered from the sides, lay 26 steps below the upper cour d'honneur, which could be approached only by a monumental axial staircase with paired helical flights rising from a central raised landing. Wimbledon's series of terraces and axial stairs and its hilltop site was "inspired presumably" by the Villa Farnese at Caprarola.

The estate stood within a day's ride of Westminster, making it eminently suitable for an active courtier; there, the Cecils entertained Queen Elizabeth I for three days in 1599. John Thorpe's undated plan of Wimbledon's ground floor and forecourts of ca 1609, suggests that they were about twelve acres in extent, divided among eleven separate spaces, featuring plantations, walks, and parterres, laid out asymmetrically on the sloping site.

During the libel trial of Anne Lake Cecil, Lady Ros in 1618, evidence was submitted that a servant overheard the Countess of Exeter in the great chamber. It was said that James VI and I visited to check the acoustics. The house was damaged in 1628 by the accidental igniting of gunpowder stored there. The glories of this house, after repairs had been effected, were concentrated in the long Gallery, one of two in the house, which was richly painted and marbleized, no doubt by Francis Cleyn, who was responsible also for the exterior that was painted en camaieu in tones of yellow and burnt ochre.

== King Charles I and Queen Henrietta Maria ==
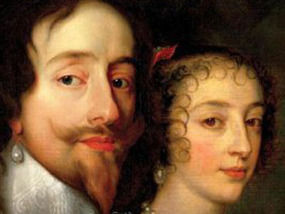
King Charles I and Queen Henrietta Maria

Immediately after Viscount Wimbledon died, in 1638, the manor together with manor house was sold by his heirs to trustees for the queen of Charles I, who gave it to Queen Henrietta Maria. Alterations and expansion were made in 1640–41, just at the outbreak of the English Civil War. Overseeing plans and construction was the court architect Inigo Jones, Surveyor of the King's Works, and on site was the prominent sculptor-builder Nicholas Stone. The two-storey house with a flat balustraded roof was severe in outward aspect. Thomas Fuller calls Wimbledon manor house "a daring structure;" and says, that "by some it has been thought to equal Nonsuch, if not to exceed it."

The magnificent gardens were created for the Queen by French garden designer André Mollet. He organised a new symmetrical arrangement on the south front. An old sunken garden to the east became an orange garden with parterres and orangery. A richly decorated room "below stairs" in the service quarters of the main house was used by the gardeners to plant orange and pomegranate trees in "boxes" or planters.

The house and gardens were described in a survey made in 1649. The old east wing of the house had incorporated a shell grotto. Inigo Jones reworked this wing with a chapel and marble parlour beside a terrace overlooking the orange garden. Henrietta Maria's bed was set in an alcove in the stone gallery on the west side. A large attic space was used for drying clothes. Interiors included panelling, some unpainted or varnished green, and "liver coloured" in the Marble Parlour. Several rooms were decorated with gilded stars. The floor of the long gallery was sweet smelling cedar. After noting the lower court and the upper court, the survey reported its several ascents in detail, counting the very steps:

The scite of this manor-house being placed on the side slipp of a rising ground, renders it to stand of that height that, betwixt the basis of the brick-wall of the sayd lower court, and the hall door of the sayd manor-house, there are five severall assents, consisting of three-score and ten stepps, which are distinguished in a very graceful manner; to witt, from the parke to a payre of rayled gates, set betwixt two large pillers of brick; in the middle of the wall standing on the north side of the sayd lower court is the first assent, consisting of eight stepps, of good freestone, layed in a long square, within which gates, levell with the highest of those eight stepps, is a pavement of freestone, leading to a payr of iron gates rayled on each side thereof with turned ballasters of freestone, within which is a little paved court leading to an arched vault neatly pillowred with brick, conteyning on each side of the pillers a little roome well arched, serving for celleridge of botteled wines; on each side of this vault are a payre of staires of stone stepps, twentie-three stepps in assent, eight foote nine inches broad; meeting an even landing-place in the height thereof, leading from the foresayed gates unto the lower court, and make the second assent; from the height of this assent a pavement of Flanders brickes thirteene foot six inches broad", leading "to the third assent, which stands on the south side of the lower courte, consisting of a round modell, in the middle whereof is a payre of iron gates rayled as aforesayd, within which is a fountayne fitted with a leaden cesterne fed with a pipe of lead; this round conteynes a payre of stone stayres of 26 stepps in assent, ordered and adorned as the second assent is, and leades into the sayd higher courte, and soe makes the third assent; from the height whereof a pavement of square stone nine foote broad and eightie-seaven foote long leades up to the fowerth assent, which consists of eleven stepps of freestone very well wrought and ordered, leading into a gallery paved with square stone, sixtie-two foote long and eight foote broad....

From the forementioned first assent there is a way cut forth of the parke, planted on each side thereof with elmes and other trees, in a very decent order, extending itself in a direct line two hundred thirty-one perches from thence quite through the parke northward unto Putney-common, being a very special ornament to the whole house.

== Civil War and the Interregnum ==
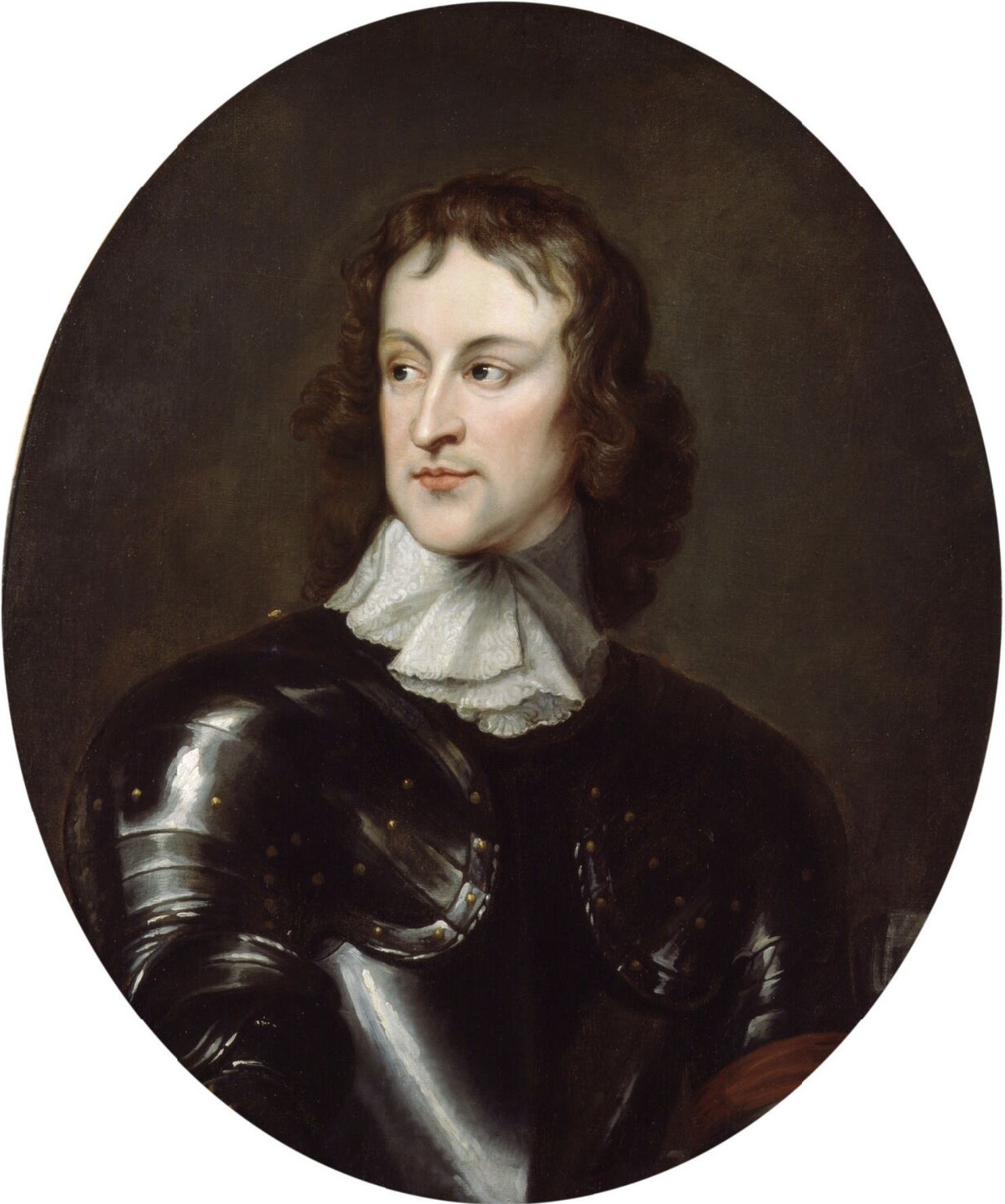
General John Lambert by John Walker c.1653

As a consequence of the English Civil War, the monarchy was overthrown in 1649 and the Crown lands were put up for sale. The manor passed to the Cromwellian General John Lambert. "Lambert," says Roger Coke, in A Detection of the Court and State of England during the four last reigns and the interregnum (1719), "after he had been discarded by Cromwell, betook himself to Wimbledon-house, where he turned florist, and had the finest tulips and gilliflowers that could be got for love or money; yet in these outward pleasures he nourished the ambition which he entertained before he was cashiered by Cromwell." The reputation of Wimbledon manor house in the history of flower gardening thus begins with General Lambert, who painted some of the flowers he was cultivating. Though the Queen's flower gardens may have fallen to ruin in the decade of the Civil War, the glory of Wimbledon aside from the straight avenue of elms and other trees centred on the house, that stretched forth as far as Putney was chiefly its fruit. Among a thousand fruit trees of every kind, the Parliament-men who inventoried the house and gardens in 1649 noted the "three great and fayer" fig trees that covered a very "greate part of the walls of the south side of the manor-house" "by the spreading and dilating of themselves in a very large proporcion, but yet in a most decent manner"; to have grown so extensive in 1649 the figs must have been planted in the time of Lord Exeter or his son Lord Wimbledon. The orangery in 1649 held 42 orange trees planted in boxes, valued at £10 each, and 18 young ones, a lemon tree "bearing greate and very large lemmons" (£20) a "pomecitron" tree" (Citrus medica, valued at £10), and six pomegranate trees. Doubtless the inventoried bay tree (Laurus nobilis) and the equally tender "Irish arbutis, very lovely to looke upon," were being taken into the orangery for winter protection, as England was then in the frigid grip of the Little Ice Age.

== The Restoration ==
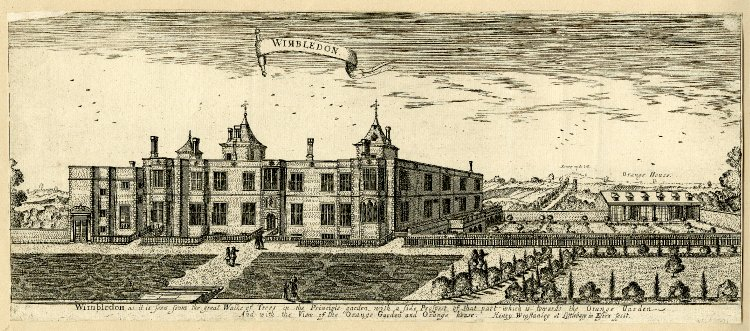
Garden view (south elevation) of Wimbledon Palace 1678

When the monarchy was restored in 1660 with Charles II, Wimbledon manor was promptly given back to Charles' widow Henrietta Maria, who sold it the following year to trustees for John Digby, 1st Earl of Bristol. Bristol's widow sold it to Thomas Osborne, 1st Earl of Danby, the Lord Treasurer, who was afterwards created Duke of Leeds. John Evelyn's name is loosely connected with the gardens on the grounds he went with the Lord Treasurer to view the house and grounds, 18 March 1678: of an entry in his diary that same year: "My Lord Treasurer sent for me to accompany him.to Wimbledon, which he had lately purchased of the Earl of Bristol; so breaking fast with him privately in his chamber, I accompanied him with two of his daughters, my lord Conway, and Sir Bernard Gascoyne, and having surveyed his gardens and alterations, returned late at night."

== Sir Theodore Janssen ==
Janssen's manor house.Built 1720.

Map of Wimbledon dated 1741 by John Rocque A:Part of Wimbledon Common B.Part of Old Park C. Part of Wimbledon Park with Marlborough house D. Belvedere House E. Janssen's home after stripped of manor.

Janssen's manor house later Belvedere House, with 1782 alterations to façade + additional storey; possibly completing the Campbell design. Photo 1888. Demolished 1900

The Duke's heirs sold the manor in 1717, to Sir Theodore Janssen, 1st Baronet of Wimbledon, one of the founding directors of the Bank of England, and the ill-fated South Sea Company. Janssen paid the famous architect Colen Campbell and Gould, £70 as "overseers" of a new house to be built for him at Wimbledon in 1720. Built in part with brick from the Elizabethan manor house on a new site to the south west of St Mary's Church. Janssen, as a director of the South Sea Company, was heavily involved in the South Sea Bubble fiasco, where the directors were accused by Parliament, in 1721, of committing fraud. Parliament itself was not immune from implication in the scandal, for several members of the cabinet were impeached for their corruption. The Chancellor of the Exchequer, John Aislabie, was found guilty of the "most notorious, dangerous and infamous corruption", and imprisoned. Janssen petitioned Parliament for leniency before they introduced a Bill enabling them to confiscate the assets of the directors. Parliament allowed him to keep £50,000 but in the end he evidently kept £100,000" Consequently, in 1721, he was also stripped of Wimbledon manor by Parliament.

In 1741, Janssen, appears to be living next door to the house he had built, albeit with the Campbell design incomplete (see map). Because the house was sold in 1749, the year after his death, this might indicate that he at least continued to own the house, which had been separated from the manor estate, in 1721; with the Rush family as tenants (see map). This theory appears to be confirmed by the Wimbledon Museum: "Although he (Janssen) was allowed to keep his newly built house he preferred to live in another, nearer the High Street". Reports that Sarah Churchill, Duchess of Marlborough owned and demolished this house, therefore, seem to be incorrect. Sir Theodore continued to live out his life quietly in Wimbledon. He died in 1748 aged 94 and is buried in the graveyard of St Mary's Church.

So in 1749 the Janssen house and land comprising some 70 acres, was sold to Mrs Martha Rush. In 1759 it was inherited by her son Samuel. In 1782 alterations were made to the façade and a further storey was added; possibly completing the original Campbell design (see pic). In 1783 the estate was inherited by Sir William Beaumaris Rush who died there in 1833 aged 83. The family were for a century and a half the proprietors of a great vinegar yard in Southwark, afterwards Potts's, and from the last of those wealthy merchants Sir William inherited a large fortune. The house, which had become known as Belvedere House, stood at what became the rear gardens of today's Nos. 6-12 Alan Road, was eventually demolished in 1900, to make way for a housing development to be known as the Belvedere Estate.

== The Duchess of Marlborough ==
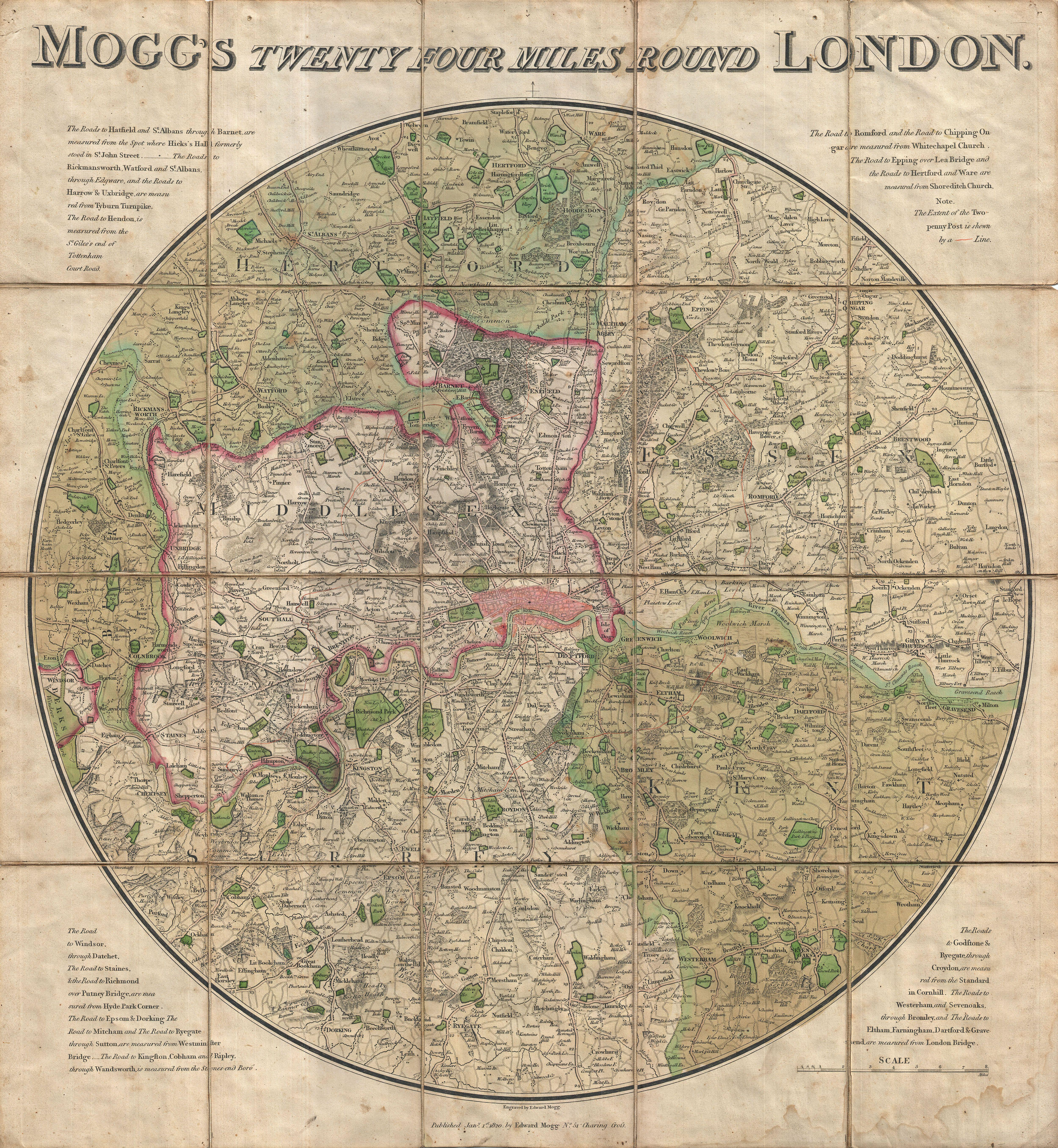
Extract from Mogg's Twenty Four Miles Round London, 1820 shows the overall extent of the various parcels then forming the manor.

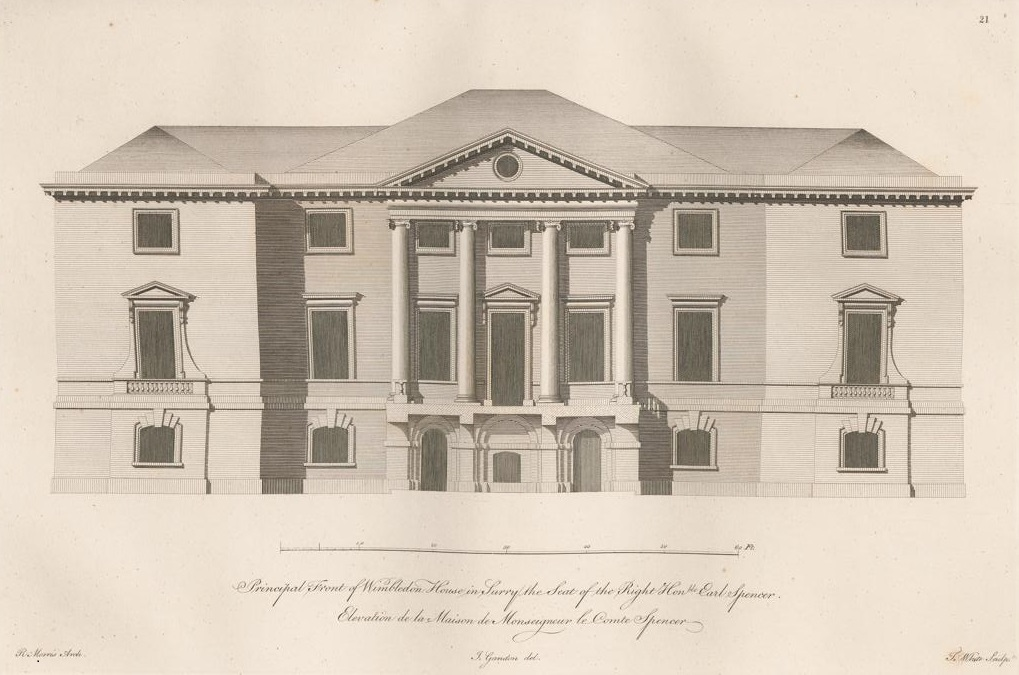
Wimbledon manor house built for Sarah Duchess of Marlborough by Henry Herbert, Earl of Pembroke 1733. Engraving from Vitruvius Britannicus Vol.V, 1771. Burnt down 1785.

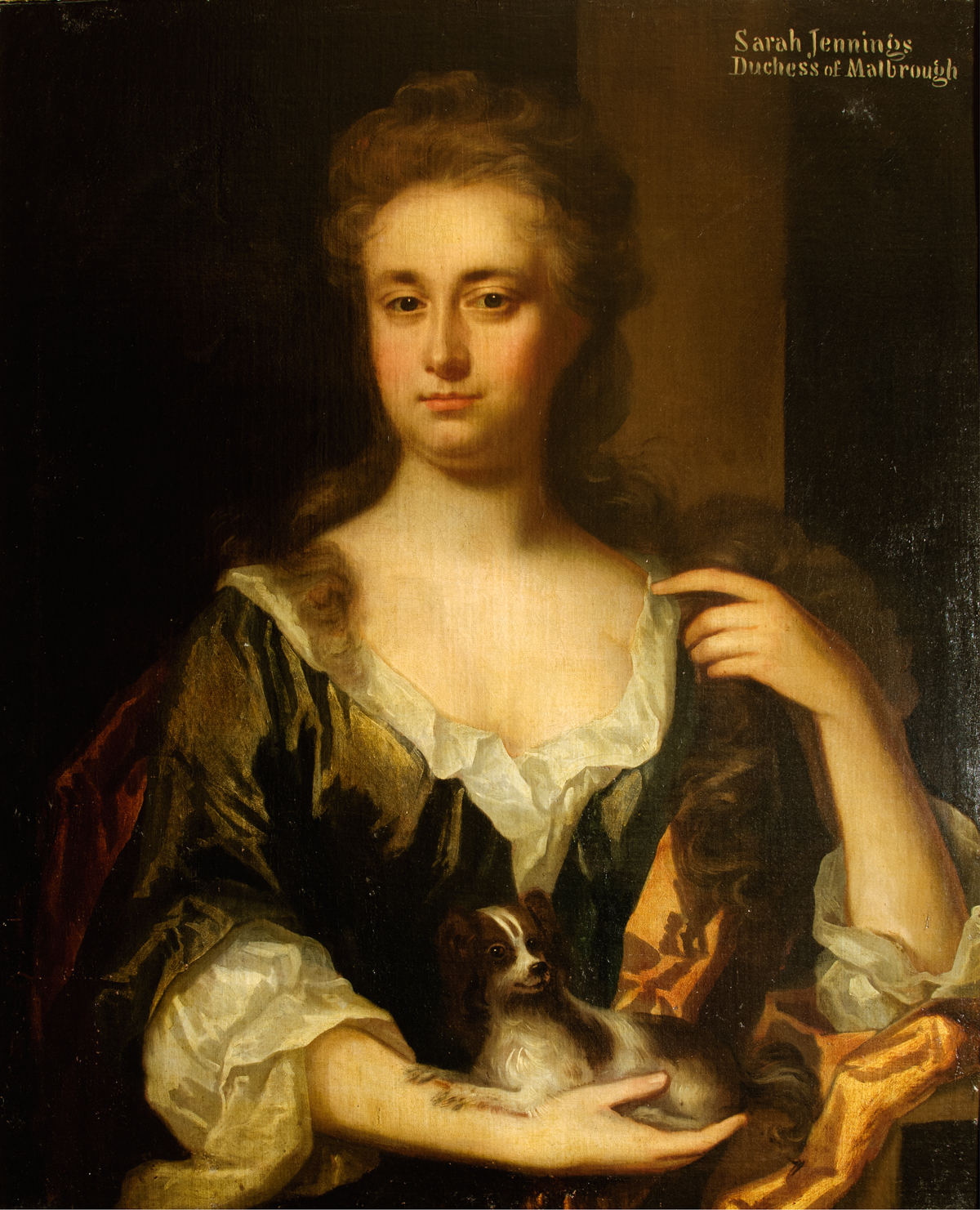
Sarah Churchill (née Jennings), Duchess of Marlborough. Circle of John Closterman c.1700

In 1723, the manor was purchased for £15,000 by Sarah Churchill, Duchess of Marlborough. Sarah was the widow of John Churchill, 1st Duke of Marlborough, who had died the year before, in 1722.The Duchess demolished the remains of the old Cecil manor house then she turned to the "Architect Earl" of Pembroke, Henry Herbert, for another house on a new site completed in 1733. This was immediately behind where the former Cecil house had stood and close to the junction of the present Arthur Road and Home Park Road in the grounds of the current Ricards Lodge school.This iteration of Wimbledon manor house was engraved in 1771 for the fifth volume of Vitruvius Britannicus, where attribution for the design of fifty years previous was given to Lord Pembroke's assistant Roger Morris. Letters of the Duchess of Marlborough do mention Morris on the site, but implying that he was acting on Pembroke's behalf, and the architect-builder Francis Smith of Warwick is also mentioned, as surveyor. Palladian Wimbledon manor was a compact house of gray brick with Portland stone dressings, of seven bays, its broader end bays slightly projecting; the three central bays were crowned with a pediment over a lightly projecting Ionic portico of four attached columns.The ground floor was sunken to allow the Duchess, who had gout, to enter at first floor level, without going up steps. Evidently the Duchess was not pleased with the finished house for she wrote to her granddaughter, Diana Russell, Duchess of Bedford, sometime between 1732 and 1735 that the Earl's talent was little more than to "imitate ill whatever was useless" in Inigo Jones and Andrea Palladio's buildings.

English Heritage, which lists Wimbledon Park a Grade II* protected monument, suggest that the Duchess consulted the landscape gardener Charles Bridgeman, but the extent of his contribution is unknown. Through the Duchess of Marlborough, Wimbledon manor passed, in 1744, to her heir, the 10-year-old John, 1st Viscount Spencer, soon to be made the 1st Earl Spencer.Under a contract of late 1764 Lancelot "Capability" Brown undertook landscaping projects in the park, which still comprised some 1200 acres; his work, which included the lake (Wimbledon Park Lake), was complete by 1768, In 1780, Hannah More visited the house as the guest of Jonathan Shipley, Bishop of St Asaph, to whom Lord Spencer lent the house annually for a season: "I did not think there could have been so beautiful a place within seven miles of London. The park has as much variety of ground, and is as un-Londonish as if it were an hundred miles out." Hannah More enjoyed the Duchess of Marlborough's books in the library, where: "numbers of the books were presents to her from the great authors of her time, whose names she had carefully written in the blank leaves, for I believe she had the pride of being thought learned, as well as rich and beautiful." "elegantly fitted up, and are used as an occasional retirement by Lord Spencer's family. The situation is singularly eligible, having a beautiful home prospect of the park, with a fine piece of water towards the north, and an extensive view over the country of Surrey on the south." The house burnt down at Easter 1785, spreading from the laundry-room where linen was being aired in preparation for the return of the family after a brief absence. Lord Spencer cleared away the ruins and leveled and turfed the ground, so that scarcely a trace remained of its foundations except for a tunnel, which still survives, which had linked the main house to the separate staff quarters.

== Spencer Wimbledon ==
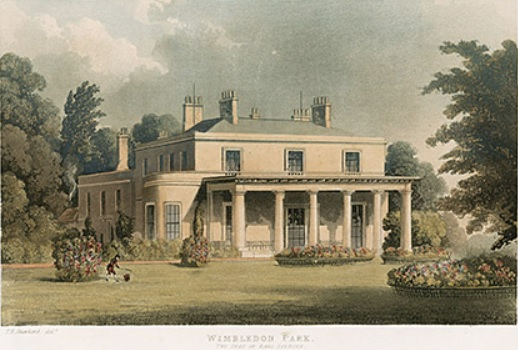
Wimbledon Park House. The last Wimbledon manor house. Built for the 2nd Earl Spencer 1799-1802 by architect Henry Holland. Demolished c.1949. Lithograph by Rudolph Ackermann 1825

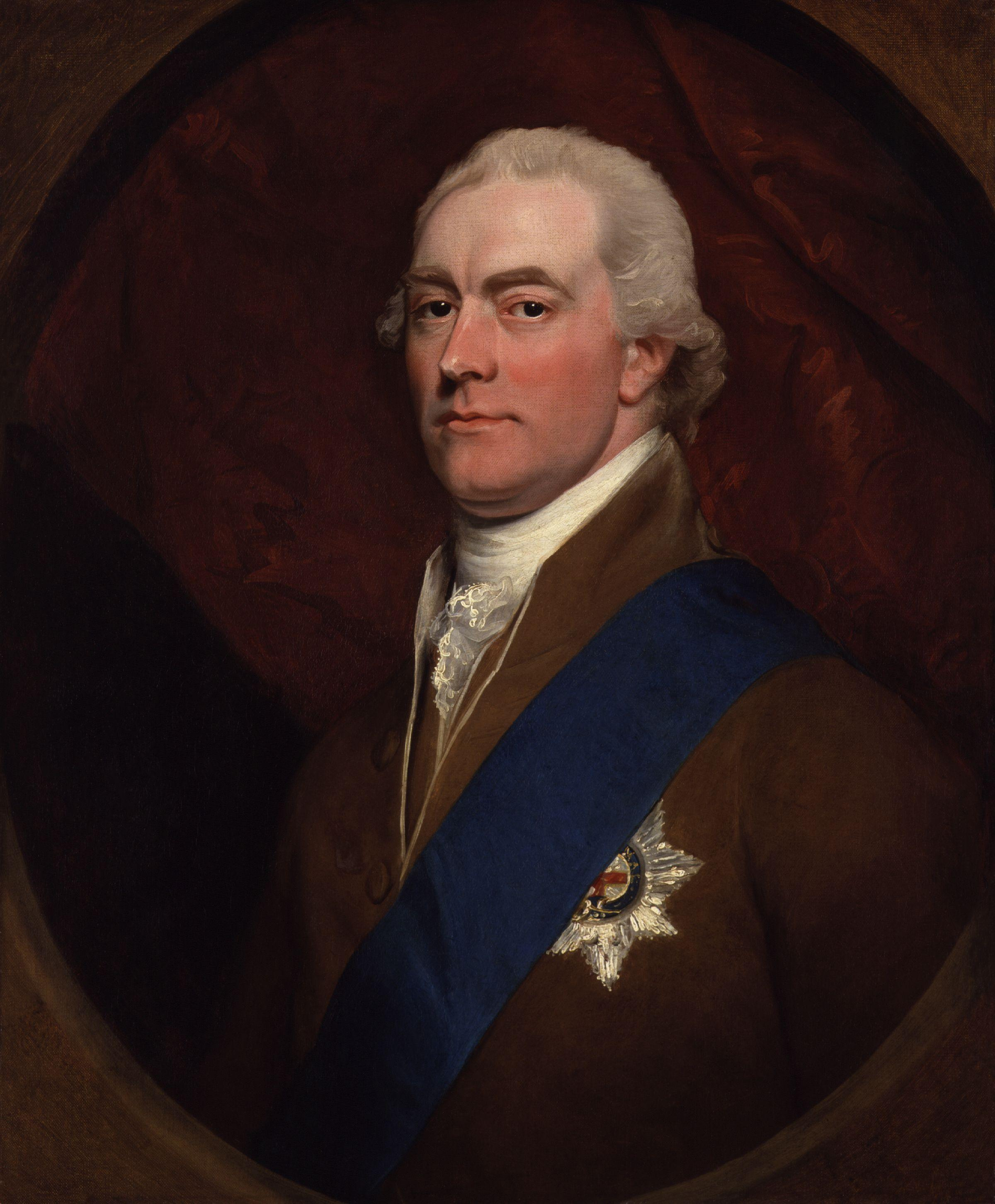
George Spencer, 2nd Earl by John Singleton Copley 1800

Between 1799 and 1802 George John Spencer, 2nd Earl Spencer had Wimbledon manor house rebuilt, in the Regency style, very close to the site of the Marlborough house, incorporating the surviving staff quarters. The new house would be called Wimbledon Park House, allegedly to designs by 'Capability' Brown's son-in-law, Henry Holland. Joseph Paxton, renowned later as the designer of the Crystal Palace for the 1851 Great Exhibition, worked here as a garden-boy assisting his brother, the head gardener. Sir Joseph Paxton returned to design new formal gardens in the 1840s for Edward St Maur, 11th Duke of Somerset, Spencer's tenant at the house from 1827. In 1838 the Duke entertained Queen Victoria there. In 1846 the Spencers left Wimbledon Park House, selling the estate (but not the manorial title) for £85,000 (£71 an acre), to the real estate developer John Augustus Beaumont, an insurance company director, who reduced the size of the park after 1860, with speculative streets of houses. The last Wimbledon manor house, Wimbledon Park House, isolated from its parkland and surrounded by increasingly dense suburban development, and having passed through a succession of owners, became dilapidated — the house was demolished in about 1949. The land on which it and the Marlborough house had stood was the site of Park House Middle School, built in 1972 and demolished in the early 2000s after Merton London Borough Council reverted to a two-tier school system. It now forms part of the sports fields of Ricards Lodge High School. In 1864, still lord of the manor, John Spencer, 5th Earl Spencer, attempted to get a private parliamentary bill to enclose Wimbledon Common, which he still owned, for the creation of a new park with a house and gardens and to sell part for building. Though Sir Joseph Paxton testified on Earl Spencer's behalf, in a landmark decision for English common land, and following an enquiry, permission was refused and 1871-created Board of Conservators received the land to preserve it in its natural condition. In 1996 Charles Spencer, 9th Earl Spencer sold his vestigial interest in Wimbledon, the title of lord of the manor of Wimbledon, to a buyer from Brazil for £171,000; manors may bring minor rights such as fishing, lesser mineral, and foraging rights but no powers nor property are believed to appertain to the archaic estate (interest in land), an incorporeal hereditament.
