= Custos Rotulorum of Lincolnshire =

This is a list of people who have served as Custos Rotulorum of Lincolnshire.

At the inception of the office (bef. 1544), a custos rotulorum was appointed for each of the three Parts of Lincolnshire. By 1554 these were Richard Ogle for Holland, Sir Richard Hussey for Kesteven, and Sir Thomas Heneage for Lindsey. This arrangement was discontinued with the appointment of a single custos for all Lincolnshire in 1549.

== Lincolnshire ==
- Sir John Hussey 1513

== Kesteven ==
- Sir Richard Hussey c.1544

== Holland ==
- Richard Ogle c.1544

== Lindsey ==
- Sir Robert Sheffield by 1516–?1518
- Sir Thomas Heneage c.1544

== Lincolnshire ==
- William Cecil, 1st Baron Burghley 1549 – aft. 1584
- Thomas Cecil, 1st Earl of Exeter bef. 1594 – aft. 1608
- William Cecil, 2nd Earl of Exeter 1619–1640
- Montagu Bertie, 2nd Earl of Lindsey 1640–1666

For later custodes rotulorum, see Lord Lieutenant of Lincolnshire.
