= Anne Lake Cecil, Lady Ros =

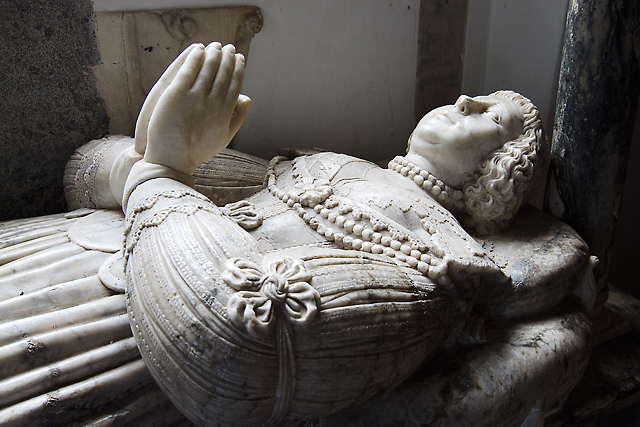
Monument to Anne, Lady Rodney, at the Church of St Leonard, Rodney Stoke

Anne Lake Cecil, Lady Roos or de Ros (1599–1630) was an English aristocrat involved in a major scandal at the Jacobean court.

== Early years ==
She was the daughter of Sir Thomas Lake and his wife Mary Ryder, a daughter of William Ryder, haberdasher and Mayor of London in 1600. She was probably brought up in the family homes in Charing Cross, London, and at Cannons in Little Stanmore.

== Lady Ros ==
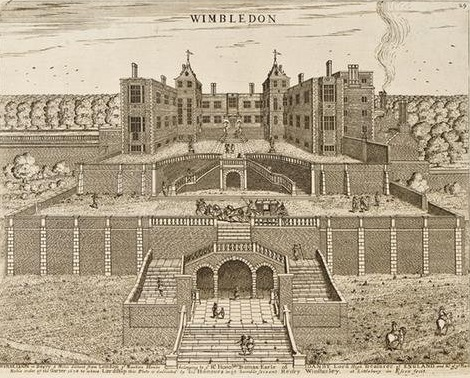
Wimbledon Manor House

She married William Cecil, 16th Baron Ros, a son of William Cecil, 2nd Earl of Exeter in 1616. The marriage broke down causing a feud between the Cecil and Lake families. The couple lived apart, apparently by the choice of the Lake family. William, Lord Ros, came to their house at Cannons in 1617 to collect Anne, Lady Ros, but was ambushed by her brother Arthur Lake and his armed servants.

Accusations and counter-accusations included rumours of affairs and poisoning attempts. It was said that the Baron Ros had an affair with his step-grandmother Frances and was the father of the 1st Earl of Exeter's youngest child.

Anne's reputation suffered, and Lady Anne Clifford wrote in her diary that "there were spoken extraordinarily foul matters of my Lady Ross". Her servants Katherine Maynard and Sara Swarton were said to have spread rumours about her.

The Earl of Exeter brought a case for slander against Lady Ros and her family in January 1618. Lady Lake was said to have accused Lady Exeter of trying to poison Lady Ros, with a medicinal "glister" or "clyster" and syrup of roses.

Lady Ros and her maid were held in custody, Lady Ros in the keeping of the Bishop of London, and the maid with Edmund Doubleday. Luke Hatton, formerly a groom of the chamber to the Earl of Exeter, was also held. Hatton was claimed to have informed the Lakes about the Countess of Exeter's plans, and so be the author of the slander. He provided Lady Ros with a written statement that the Countess of Exeter had talked of giving Lady Ros a "dramme", apparently a measure of poison. He soon denied writing this statement.

James VI and I took a personal interest in the proceedings and the case was heard in the Star Chamber. He considered a letter from the Countess of Exeter to Lady Ros to be a forgery.

Testimony from the servant Sara Swarton alias Waite was discredited when the court visited the Cecil great chamber or long gallery at Wimbledon Manor. She had claimed to have overheard crucial evidence while hiding there behind tapestry and listening to the Countess of Exeter reading out loud. As the hangings did not reach the ground, Swarton or Lady Ros said she had been further concealed by a handy chair. Swarton was sentenced to be fined and branded in her cheek, and sent to the Bridewell prison for life.

King James was said have personally investigated the room at Wimbledon where Swarton alleged to have overheard the Countess of Exeter speaking or reading her writing aloud at a window. The story was related in two versions by William Sanderson in his Compleat History Of The Lives and Reigns Of Mary, Queen of Scotland, And James, and Aulicus Coquinariae:

To make further tryal, the king, in a hunting journy, at New Park, neer Wimbleton, gallops thither, viewes the room; observing the great distance of the window from the lower end of the room, and placing himself behind the hanging, and so other lords in turn, they could not hear one speak aloud from the window. Then the housekeeper was called, who protested those hangings had constantly furnisht that room for thirty years, which the king observed to be two foot short of the ground, and might discover the woman if hidden behind them".

The Lake family were found to be at fault. Anne was to make a confession of her guilt and forgery, known as a "recognition" in the Star Chamber, but a written and signed submission was accepted. She spent a short period in the Tower of London. Sara Swarton confessed she had not overheard the Countess of Exeter while listening behind the Wimbledon hangings. Swarton was released after making a public submission at St Martin-in-the-Fields.

== Lady Rodney ==
The Baron Ros died in 1618. There was a rumour that Lady Ros might marry Endymion Porter. Subsequently, in 1621, she married George Rodney, a younger son of Sir John Rodney. John Chamberlain wrote "Lady Rosse is said to be married to a young gentleman of small means as being a younger brother".

Edward Rodney, another member of the family, had married a courtier Frances Southwell, a gentlewoman in the household of Anne of Denmark in 1614 at Somerset House.

She died in 1630 and was buried at St Leonard's, Rodney Stoke.
