= Elizabeth Cecil, 15th Baroness Ros =

English Baroness (1575–1591)

Elizabeth Manners, 15th Baroness Ros (c. January 1574 or 1575 – 1 May 1591) was the daughter and heir of Edward Manners, 3rd Earl of Rutland and his wife Isabella Manners (née Holcroft). On her father's death, the Earldom of Rutland devolved upon his brother, the Barony of Ros passed to his daughter, Elizabeth suo jure.

In January 1589, aged around 13 or 14, Baroness Ros married, at Newark Castle, William Cecil, Lord Burghley, son of Thomas Cecil, 1st Earl of Exeter and Dorothy Neville, daughter of John Nevill, 4th Baron Latimer and Lucy Somerset. As she was a ward of the Crown and could not marry without licence, Lord Burghley was fined £600, however it had been shown in their defence that the late Earl of Rutland desired the marriage and that his widow, the Dowager Countess, had given her consent to it taking place. Lord Burghley later succeeded as 2nd Earl of Exeter.

Baroness Ros died in childbirth on 1 May 1591, in London, at Tower Street, All Hallows, Barking and was buried in Westminster Abbey. She was succeeded in the Barony of Ros by her son, William Cecil, 16th Baron Ros, who later became Ambassador Extraordinary to Spain.

Peerage of England
Preceded by Edward Manners	Baroness Ros; 1587–1591	Succeeded by William Cecil
