= Thomas Cecil, 1st Earl of Exeter =

English politician and courtier (1542–1623)

The Earl of Exeter
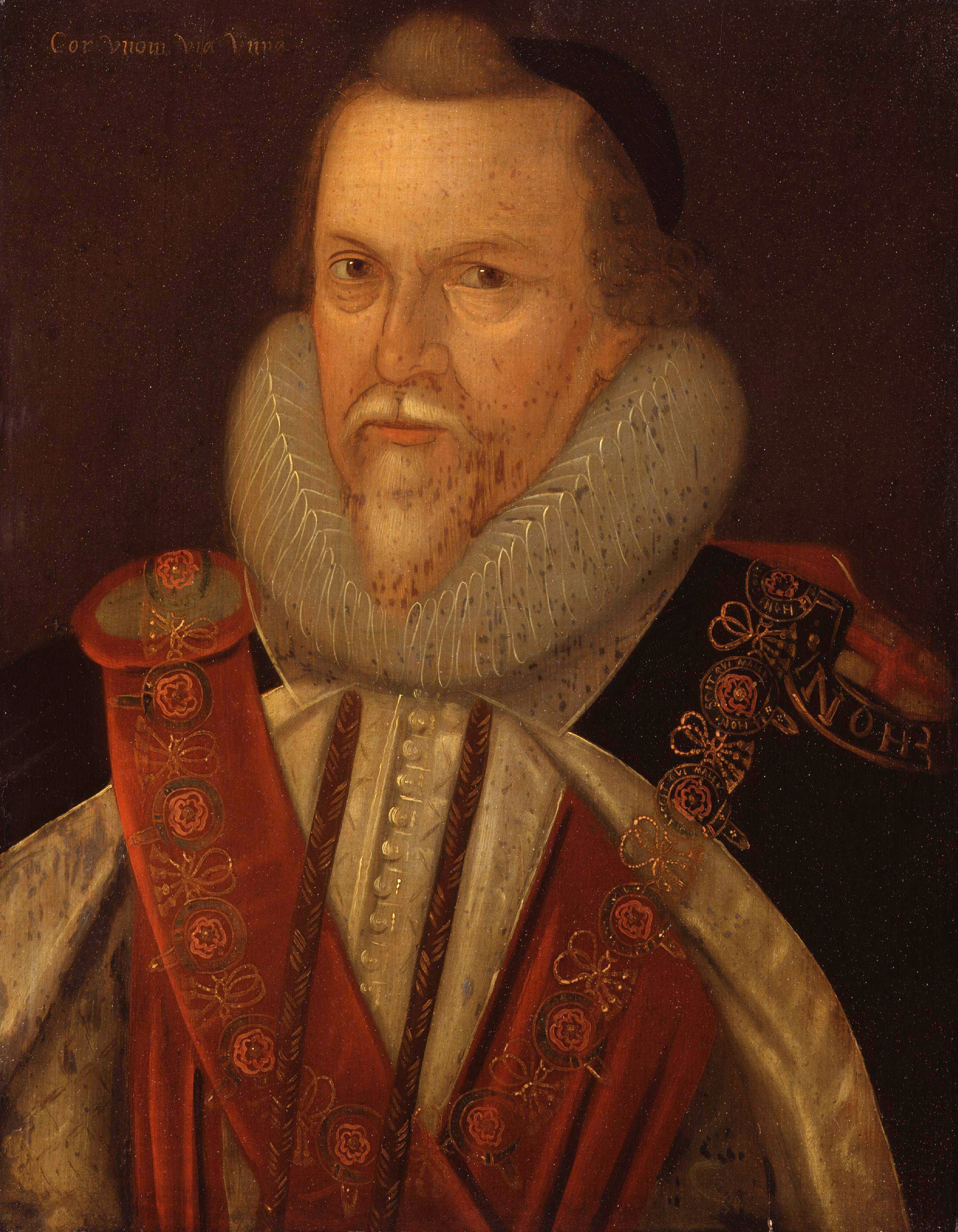
- Thomas Cecil, 1st Earl of Exeter
- Tenure: 4 May 1605 – 8 February 1623
- Predecessor: William Cecil, 1st Baron Burghley
- Successor: William Cecil, 2nd Earl of Exeter
- Other titles: 2nd Baron Burghley
- Born: Thomas Cecil; 5 May 1542; St Mary the Great, Cambridge, England
- Died: 8 February 1623 (aged 80); Westminster Abbey, London, England
- Residence: Exeter House; Burghley House; Wimbledon Palace; Wothorpe Towers
- Spouses: Dorothy Neville; Frances Brydges
- Issue: William Cecil, 2nd Earl of Exeter; Lucy Cecil, Marchioness of Winchester; Mildred Cecil-Trafford; Sir Richard Cecil; Edward Cecil, 1st Viscount Wimbledon; Mary Cecil, Countess of Norwich; Dorothy Cecil, Lady Alington; Elizabeth Cecil, Lady Hatton; Thomas Cecil; Frances Cecil, Countess of Thanet
- Parents: William Cecil, 1st Baron Burghley; Mary Cheke

Thomas Cecil, 1st Earl of Exeter KG (5 May 1542 – 8 February 1623), known as Lord Burghley from 1598 to 1605, was an English politician, courtier and soldier.

== Family ==
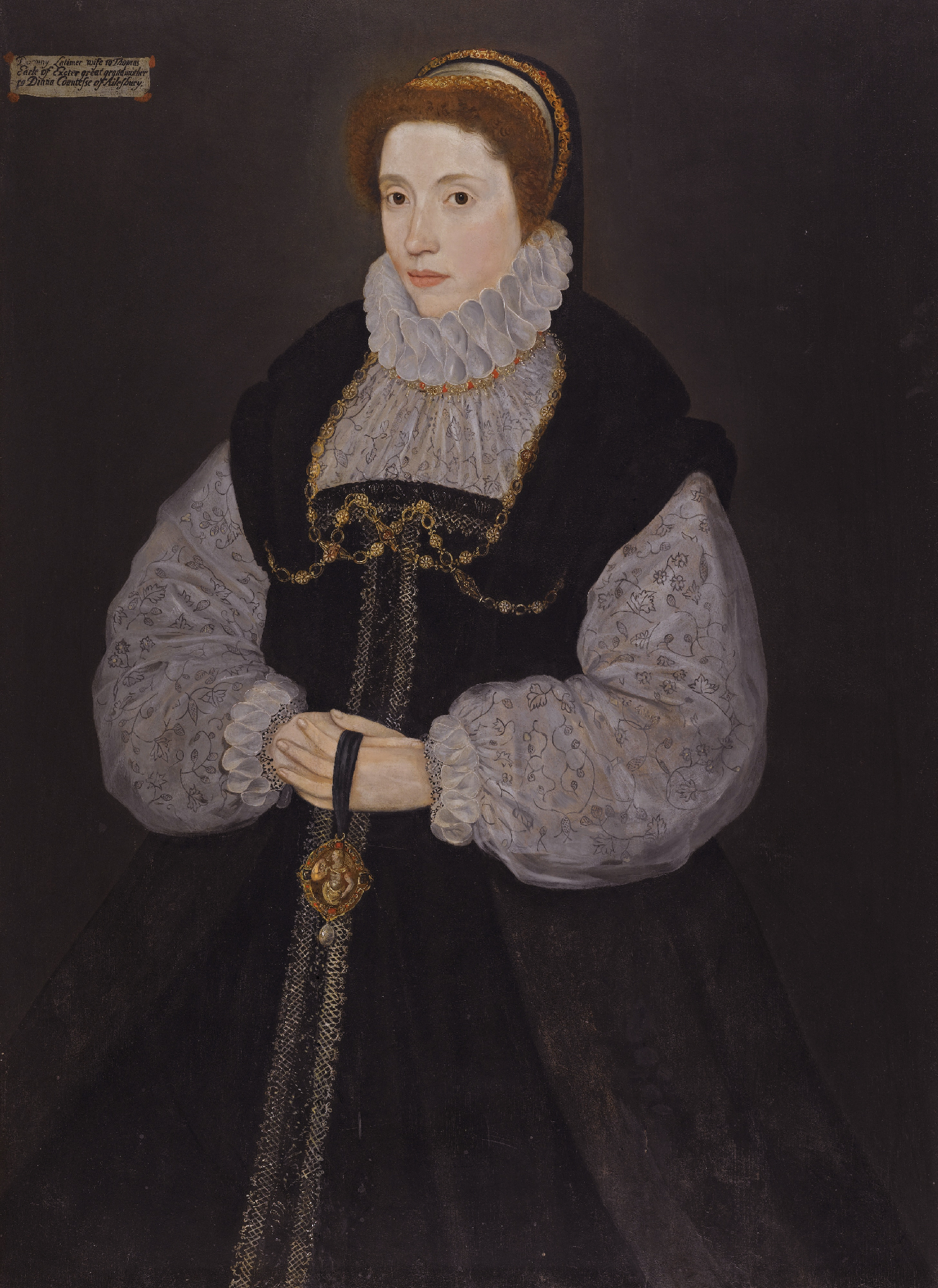
Dorothy Neville, first wife of Thomas Cecil (1549–1608)

Thomas Cecil was the elder son of William Cecil, 1st Baron Burghley, by his first wife, Mary Cheke (d. February 1543), daughter of Peter Cheke of Cambridge, Esquire Bedell of the University from 1509 until his death in 1529 (and sister of Sir John Cheke). He was the half-brother of Robert Cecil, 1st Earl of Salisbury, Anne Cecil, and Elizabeth Cecil.

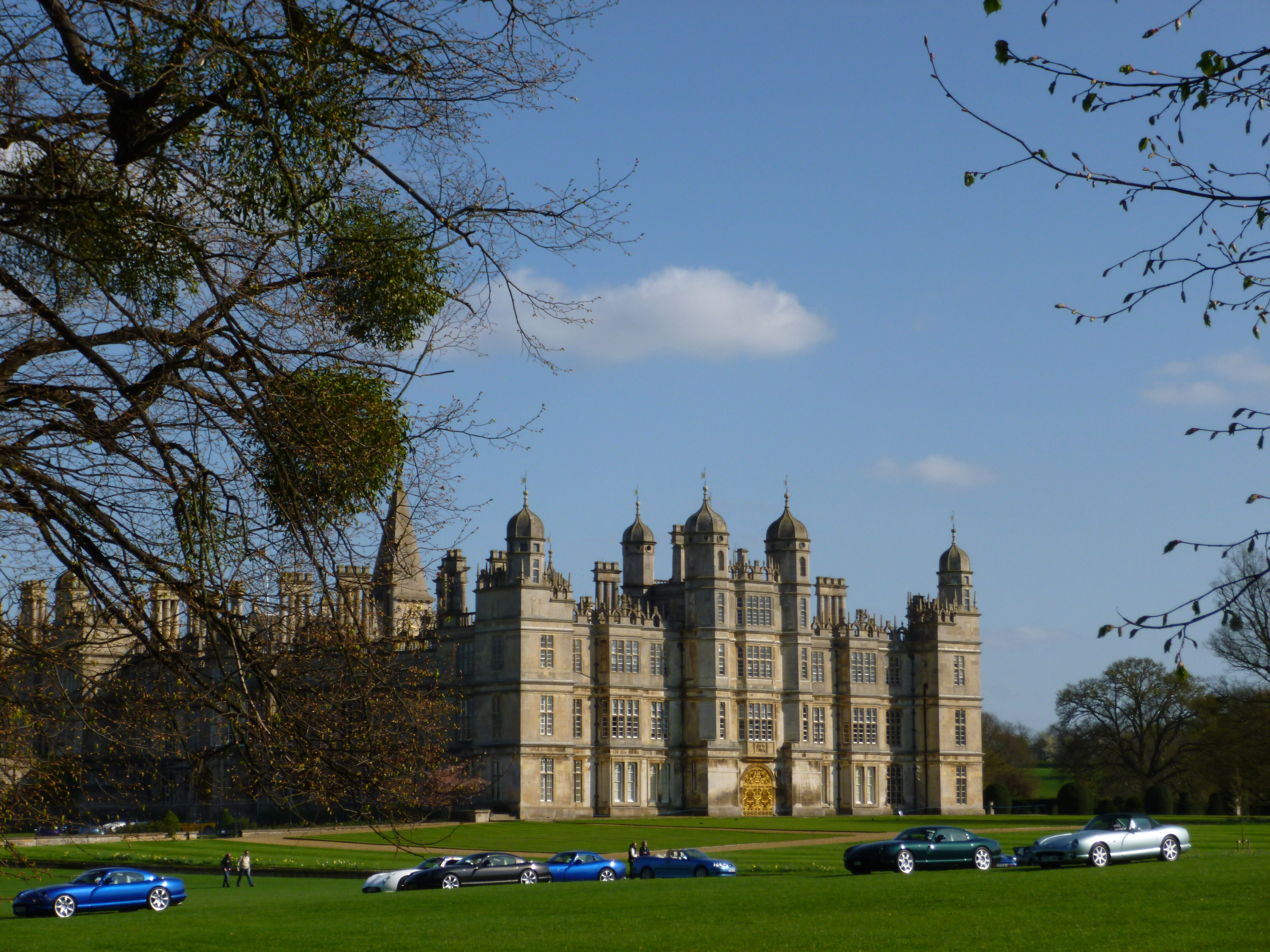
Burghley House

William Cecil declared the young Thomas to be like, "a spendyng sott, mete to kepe a tenniss court" (a spendthrift soak, suited merely to govern a tennis court), although the same source notes that "Thomas Cecil became an improved character as he advanced in life". Whilst Thomas's career may have been overshadowed by those of his illustrious father and half-brother, he was a fine soldier and a useful politician and had a good deal of influence on the building, not only of Burghley itself, but also two other important houses: Wothorpe Towers and Wimbledon Palace.

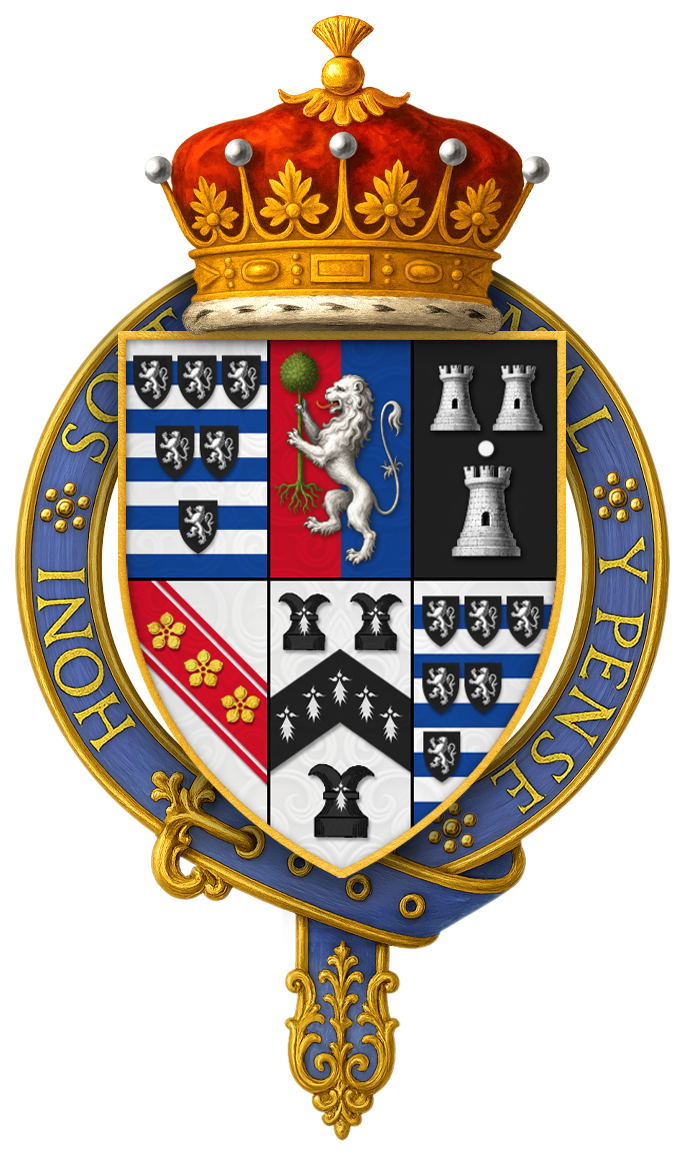
Arms of Sir Thomas Cecil, 1st Earl of Exeter, KG - Barry of ten argent and azure over all six escutcheons sable, three, two, and one, each charged with a lion rampant of the first.

== Career ==
Cecil was educated privately and at Trinity College, Cambridge, where he matriculated in 1558, being admitted to Gray's Inn in the same year. In 1561–62 he was sent with a guardian to Europe to improve himself, at first to Paris, where he applied himself more to social pleasures than to his studies. Eventually, he was removed from this environment first to Antwerp and then to Germany, and might have proceeded to Italy but for the death of his stepbrother William, which led to his being recalled to England.

He served in government under Queen Elizabeth I of England, sitting in the House of Commons first for Stamford, Lincolnshire, in the parliaments of 1563, 1571 and 1572. He was knighted in 1575 and appointed High Sheriff of Northamptonshire for 1578. He accompanied Robert Dudley, Earl of Leicester to the Dutch Republic, where he was distinguished for his bravery. In 1584 and 1586 he was member of parliament for Lincolnshire, and in 1585 was appointed governor of Brielle – an English Cautionary Town. He did not have good relations with Dudley, but he was very loyal to Sir John Norreys. In 1588, Cecil completed the building of Wimbledon Palace in Wimbledon Park, London, a leading example of the Elizabethan prodigy house. He returned again to the Commons as member for Northamptonshire in 1592 and 1597.

His father's death, later in 1598, brought him a seat in the House of Lords, the 2nd Lord Burghley, as he then was, served from 1599 to 1603 as Lord Lieutenant of Yorkshire and Lord President of the Council of the North, an office based at the King's Manor in York. It was during this period, that Queen Elizabeth I made him a Knight of the Garter in 1601.

After the death of Elizabeth in 1603, James VI and I became King of England at the Union of the Crowns. Thomas Cecil, now Lord Burghley, sent his son to Edinburgh to talk about the King's journey to England, and soon after the courtier Roger Aston came to York to speak with him. He wrote to Sir Robert Cecil that he had moved out of King's Manor in York, so that King James could stay there on his journey south to London. The house was empty of furnishings and "quite out of order". Lord Burghley stocked the wine cellars and larders. King James came to the "Manor of St Mary's" on 16 April 1603 and stayed in York for three days. Lord Burghley quarrelled with George Clifford, 3rd Earl of Cumberland over precedence and the right to carry a sword of office.

The king's wife, Anne of Denmark, came to York in June. Lord Burghley wrote to Sir Robert Cecil that Catholic ladies from Lancashire and other counties planned to come to York to ask the new queen to help establish toleration of religion. Lord Burghley thought that "she is wise enough how to answer them". After meeting Anne of Denmark, he wrote, "she will prove, if I be not deceived, a magnifical prince, a kind wife and a constant mistress".

During the early reign of King James I of England, he was created Earl of Exeter on 4 May 1605, the same day his younger half-brother, Robert Cecil, 1st Viscount Cranborne, was created 1st Earl of Salisbury. Unlike his brother, however, he did not become a government minister under King James's rule.

He attempted to build up a family alliance with one of King James's leading ministers, Sir Thomas Lake, by marrying his grandson, William Cecil, 16th Baron de Ros, to Lake's daughter, Anne Lake, in 1615, but the marriage collapsed amidst a welter of allegations and counter-allegations of adultery and incest. The ensuing scandal fascinated the Court and dragged on for years, until in 1621, the Star Chamber found that Anne, her mother, and other members of the Lake family, had fabricated all of the original allegations.

The Cecil family fostered arts; they supported musicians such as William Byrd, Orlando Gibbons, and Thomas Robinson. The latter, in his youth, was in the service of Thomas Cecil.

In 2019 Deborah Defoe proposed Thomas Cecil as a candidate in the Shakespearean authorship question in her book Behind the Arras: Thomas Cecil as Shakespeare.

== Marriages and issue ==
Thomas Cecil married, firstly, Dorothy Neville, the daughter of John Neville, 4th Baron Latimer and Lady Lucy Somerset, daughter of Henry Somerset, 2nd Earl of Worcester; and, secondly, Frances Brydges, the daughter of William Brydges, 4th Baron Chandos and Mary Hopton, and the widow of Thomas Smith, Master of Requests.

By his first wife, Thomas Cecil had ten children who survived to adulthood:

- William Cecil, 2nd Earl of Exeter.
- Lady Lucy Cecil (d. October 1614), who married William Paulet, 4th Marquess of Winchester.
- Lady Mildred Cecil (d. 23 December 1611), who married firstly, Sir Thomas Reade (d. 1595), and married secondly, Sir Edmund Trafford (c. 1560–1620).
- Sir Richard Cecil of Wakerley.
- Edward Cecil, 1st Viscount Wimbledon.
- Lady Mary Cecil (d. 18 March 1638), who married Edward Denny, 1st Earl of Norwich.
- Lady Dorothy Cecil (b. August 1577 – d. 10 November 1613), who married Sir Giles Alington of Horseheath, Cambridgeshire (1572–1638). Their daughter, Mary Alington, married Sir Thomas Hatton.
- Lady Elizabeth Cecil, who married, firstly, Sir William Newport alias Hatton (1550–1597), and secondly, Sir Edward Coke of Stoke Poges, Buckinghamshire.
- Thomas Cecil, esquire.
- Lady Frances Cecil (b. 28 February 1580/1581 – d. 21 June 1653), who married Nicholas Tufton, 1st Earl of Thanet.

His second wife Frances (d. 1663), the widow of Sir Thomas Smith, was around 30 when she married Cecil in 1609, he was 70. Ben Jonson alluded to their age difference in the masque The Gypsies Metamorphosed. Their daughter, Georgiana, was born in 1616. She was baptised at St Mary's Church, Wimbledon on 13 July 1616, with Queen Anne, wife of King James I, as godmother. She died in 1621.

The Earl of Exeter died on 7 February 1623, and was buried in the chapel of St John the Baptist, Westminster Abbey, London.

== See also ==
- Wimbledon Palace - The house Sir Thomas Cecil built

== Notes ==
Political offices
Preceded by creation	Governor of Brill, The Netherlands. bef. 1585 – aft. 1596	Succeeded by Sir Edward Conway
Preceded by The Lord Burghley	Custos Rotulorum of Lincolnshire bef. 1594 – aft. 1608	Succeeded by Lord Burghley
Preceded by Kenelm Digby	Custos Rotulorum of Rutland bef. 1594–1623	Succeeded by The Marquess of Buckingham
Vacant Title last held by The Earl of Huntingdon	Lord Lieutenant of Yorkshire; 1599–1603	Succeeded by The Lord Sheffield
Vacant Title last held by Sir Christopher Hatton	Lord Lieutenant of Northamptonshire; 1603–1623	Succeeded by The Earl of Exeter
Peerage of England
New creation	Earl of Exeter; 1605–1623	Succeeded by William Cecil
Preceded by William Cecil	Baron Burghley; 1598–1623	Succeeded by William Cecil
