= William Cecil, 16th Baron Ros =

English peer

The Right Honourable William Cecil
- Baron de Ros
- Coat of arms
- Tenure: 1591–1618
- Predecessor: Elizabeth Cecil, 15th Baroness Ros
- Successor: Francis Manners, 17th Baron Ros
- Born: May 1590; Newark Castle, Nottinghamshire
- Baptised: 4 June 1590
- Died: 27 June 1618 (aged 28)
- Spouse: Anne Lake (m. 1616)
- Father: William Cecil, 2nd Earl of Exeter
- Mother: Elizabeth Manners, 15th Baroness Ros

William Cecil, 16th Baron Ros of Helmsley (May 1590 – 27 June 1618) was an English peer, whose ill-advised marriage to Anne Lake resulted in a major scandal, which dragged on for years after his early death.

He was born at Newark Castle, Nottinghamshire, only son of William Cecil, 2nd Earl of Exeter, and baptised on 4 June 1590. In 1591, he inherited the barony of de Ros from his mother, Elizabeth Cecil, 15th Baroness de Ros.

In 1611, Roos embarked upon the early 17th-century version of the later Grand Tour, accompanied by a tutor. Whilst in Europe, Roos exhibited apparent Catholic sympathies: he "regularly dined and conversed with Catholic priests and visited English Catholics living in Brussels. Rumors of Roos’s potential conversion to Catholicism persisted during his educational travels".

On 13 February 1615 or 1616, he married Anne Lake, daughter of Sir Thomas Lake, the Secretary of State, and his wife Mary Ryther, a marriage which soon ended in divorce and a bitter feud between the two families, caused in the first place by the Cecil family's refusal to transfer lands allegedly due to Anne as part of the marriage settlement. Anne, her mother and other family members made lurid and entirely false allegations against Cecil. Cecil challenged his brother-in-law Sir Arthur Lake, generally regarded as the prime mover in the affair, to a duel, but Arthur refused the challenge.

The accusations, which included adultery with his grandfather's young second wife Frances Brydges, were so serious that he felt it wiser to leave the country for a time. He was sent by King James I on a special mission to the Holy Roman Emperor. Eventually, a thorough investigation concluded that all the charges against Cecil had been fabricated by the Lake family, several of whom were severely punished by Star Chamber as a result. The matter was not finally resolved until 1621, by which time William was dead.

He died aged 28 without issue. Since his father and grandfather both outlived him, the Earldom of Exeter passed to his first cousin David Cecil, 3rd Earl of Exeter. His mother's barony passed separately to her next heir, Francis Manners, 6th Earl of Rutland. Cecil's ex-wife Anne remarried George Rodney of Stoke Rodney, Somerset, and died in 1630.

== Sources ==
- Mosley, Charles ed. Burke's Peerage Delaware 2003 107th Edition Vol.1 p,1363

Peerage of England
Preceded by Elizabeth Cecil	Baron Ros; 1591–1618	Succeeded by Francis Manners
