= John Stow =

16th-century English historian and antiquarian (1524–1605)

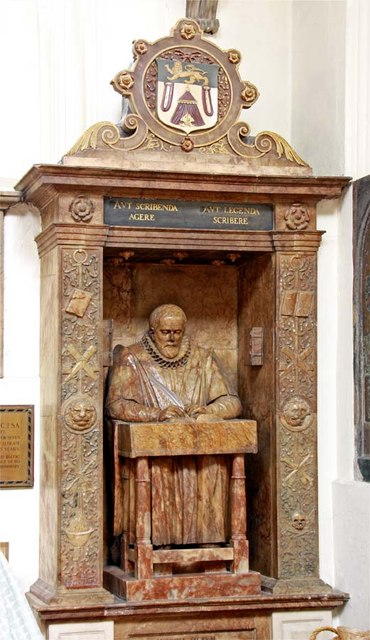
Monument with effigy of John Stow, Church of St Andrew Undershaft, City of London, with arms of the Worshipful Company of Merchant Taylors and Latin inscription: "Either do things worth writing or write things worth reading"

John Stow (also Stowe; 1524/25 – 5 April 1605) was an English historian and antiquarian. He wrote a series of chronicles of English history, published from 1565 onwards under such titles as The Summarie of Englyshe Chronicles, The Chronicles of England, and The Annales of England; and also A Survey of London (1598; second edition 1603). A. L. Rowse has described him as "one of the best historians of that age; indefatigable in the trouble he took, thorough and conscientious, accurate – above all things devoted to truth".

== Life ==
John Stow was born in about 1525 in the City of London parish of St Michael, Cornhill, then at the heart of London's metropolis. His father, Thomas Stow, was a tallow chandler. Thomas Stow is recorded as paying rent of 6s 8d per year for the family dwelling, and as a youth Stow would fetch milk every morning from a farm on the land nearby to the east owned by the Minoresses of the Convent of St Clare. There is no evidence that he ever attended a grammar school; his learning appears to have been largely self-acquired.

Stow did not take up his father's trade of tallow chandlery, instead becoming an apprentice, and in 1547 a freeman, of the Merchant Taylors' Company, by which stage he had set up business in premises close to the Aldgate Pump in Aldgate, near to Leadenhall Street and Fenchurch Street.

In about 1560 he started upon his major work, the Survey of London. His antiquarian interests attracted suspicion from the ecclesiastical authorities as a person "with many dangerous and superstitious books in his possession", and in February 1569 his house was searched. An inventory was made of all the books at his home, especially those "in defence of papistry", but he was able to satisfy his interrogators as to the soundness of his Protestantism. A second attempt to incriminate him was made in 1570 also without success.

In about 1570 he moved to the parish of St Andrew Undershaft in the Ward of Lime Street, where he lived in comfortable surroundings until his death in 1605.

== Antiquarian network ==
Stow was in close contact with many of the leading antiquarians of his day, including Archbishop Matthew Parker, John Joscelyn, John Dee, William Fleetwood, William Lambarde, Robert Glover, Henry Savile, William Camden, Henry Ferrers and Thomas Hatcher. He was active in the first Society of Antiquaries, established in about 1586. He built up an extensive library of manuscript and printed historical sources, which became known to contemporaries as his "storehouse", and which he was generous in making available to others.

== Personality ==
Stow was highly esteemed by his antiquarian contemporaries, probably in no small part because of his willingness to share his material. Sir George Buck wrote of "honest John Stow, who could not flatter and speak dishonestly, and who was a man very diligent and much inquisitive to uncover all things concerning the affairs or words or persons of princes", and characterised him as a "good antiquary and diligent searcher of knowledge". Edmund Howes described him in later life as being "of a pleasant and cheerful countenance; his sight and memory very good; very sober, mild, and courteous to any that required his instructions; and retained the true use of all his senses unto the day of his death, being of an excellent memory".

Nevertheless he was drawn into several bitter quarrels and harboured longstanding grudges. One protracted feud was with his younger brother, Thomas, over their respective shares in their mother's estate before and after her death in 1568. (John believed he was entitled to a greater share as the eldest son; Thomas claimed a greater share because he had cared for their mother during her final years.) He had further arguments with neighbours, including William Ditcher and a Mister Crowche. His quarrel with his rival chronicler Richard Grafton is noted below.

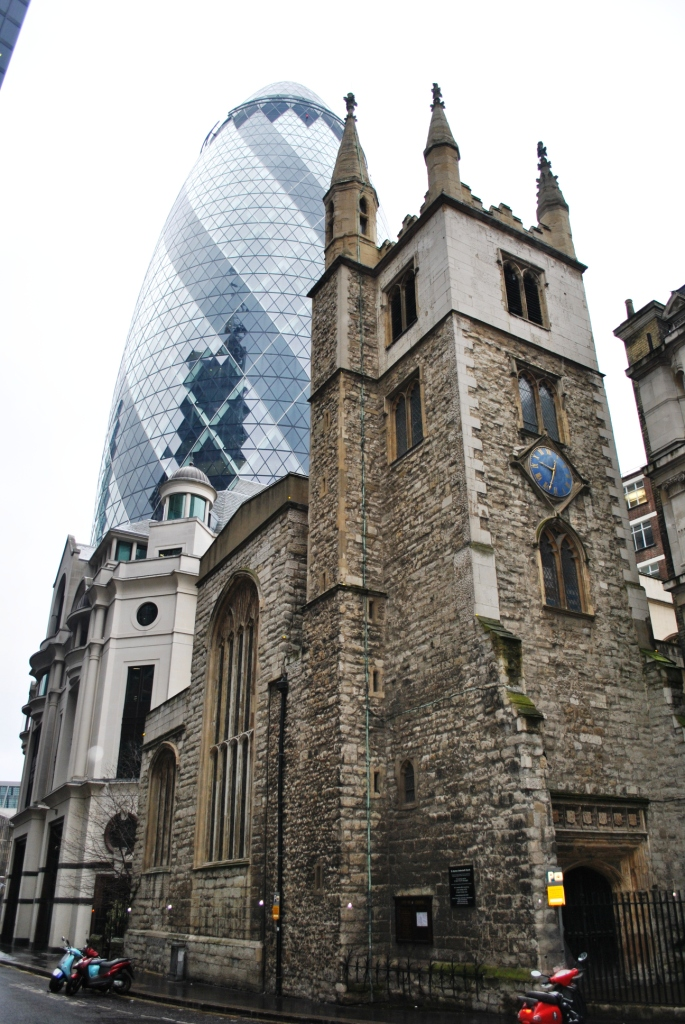
The church of St Andrew Undershaft, London, where Stow is buried

== Later years and death ==
Stow's literary efforts did not prove very remunerative, but he accepted his relative poverty with cheerful spirit: Ben Jonson relates once walking with him when Stow jocularly asked two mendicant cripples "what they would have to take him to their order". From 1579 he was in receipt of a pension of £4 per annum from the Merchant Taylors' Company; and in 1590 he petitioned the Court of Aldermen for admission to the Freedom of the City of London, in order to reduce his expenses. In about the 1590s, William Camden commissioned Stow to transcribe six autograph notebooks of John Leland in exchange for a life annuity of £8: this was probably (in part) a charitable gesture towards an old but impoverished friend. In March 1604 King James I authorised Stow and his associates to collect "amongst our loving subjects their voluntary contributions and 'kind gratuities'", and himself began "the largesse for the example of others". While such royal approval was welcome it reaped dividend too slowly for Stow to enjoy any substantial benefit during his lifetime.

Stow died on 5 April 1605 and was buried in the church of St Andrew Undershaft on the corner of Leadenhall Street and St Mary Axe.

== Works ==
Stow published his first work, The woorkes of Geffrey Chaucer, newly printed with divers additions whiche were never in printe before, in 1561.

This was followed in 1565 by his Summarie of Englyshe Chronicles (in small octavo format), and in 1566 by the related but distinct Summarie of Englyshe Chronicles ... Abridged (in sextodecimo format). Both works ran through multiple editions during Stow's lifetime: editions of the Summarie appeared in 1566, 1570, 1574, 1575 and 1590 (with additional posthumous editions, by Edmund Howes, in 1607, 1611 and 1618); and of the Summarie Abridged in 1567, 1573, 1584, 1587, 1598, and 1604. The Summarie Abridged makes disparaging allusions in its preface to the rival Abridgement of the Chronicles of England of Richard Grafton: the dispute between the two men continued to fester until Grafton's death in 1573.

In 1580, Stow published the more expansive The Chronicles of England, from Brute unto this present yeare of Christ, 1580. He later developed this into the still more substantial The Annales of England, of which editions appeared in 1592, 1601, and 1605 – the last being continued to 26 March 1605, or within ten days of Stow's own death. Further posthumous editions by Edmund Howes were published in 1615 and 1631.

Under Archbishop Matthew Parker's patronage, Stow was persuaded to produce a version of Flores historiarum, allegedly by "Matthew of Westminster", published in 1567; and then the Chronicle of Matthew Paris in 1571, and the Historia brevis of Thomas Walsingham in 1574. In the Chronicle of England 1590 Stow writes: "To The Honorable Sir John Hart, Lord Maior. The Chronicle written before that nothing is perfect the first time, and that it is incident to mankinde to erre and slip sometimes, but the point of fanta[s]tical fooles to preserve and continue in their errors."

At the urging of Archbishop Parker, Stow also compiled a "farre larger volume", a history of Britain entitled "A Historie of this Iland". He announced this as "ready to the presse" in 1592, but it proved too ambitious to be commercially viable, and he was unable to find a printer prepared to publish it. The manuscript is lost.

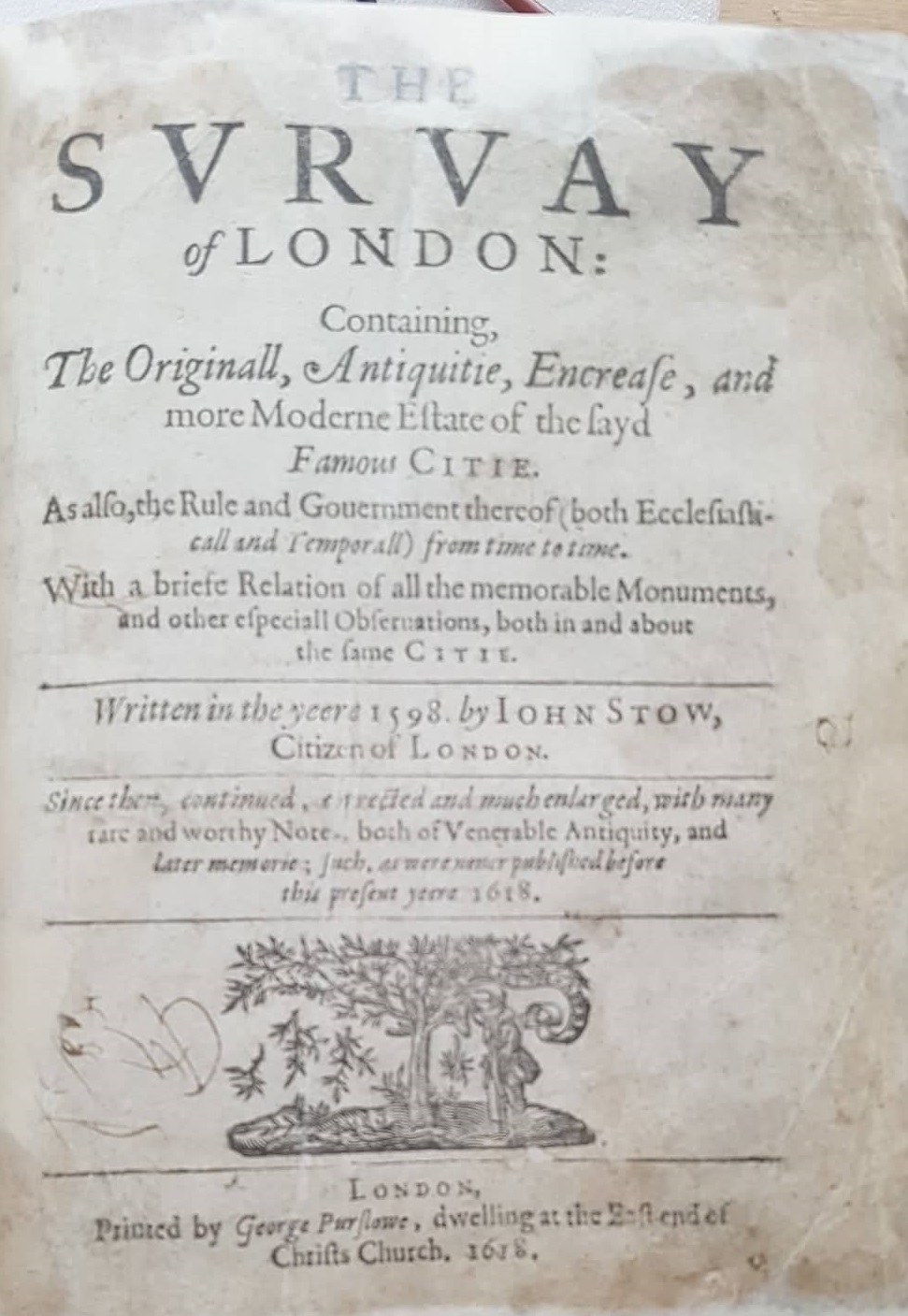
Stow's Survay of London, 1618 edition

=== Survey of London ===
The work for which Stow is best known is his Survey of London (original spelling: A Survay of London), published in 1598. This was a work of chorography: a detailed ward-by-ward topographical and historical tour of the city, providing a unique account of its buildings, social conditions and customs. A second, revised edition appeared in 1603. Following Stow's death, a third edition, with additions by Anthony Munday, appeared in 1618; a fourth by Munday and Humfrey Dyson in 1633 published by Elizabeth Purslowe; a fifth with interpolated amendments by John Strype in 1720; and a sixth by the same editor in 1754. The edition of 1598 was reprinted, edited by William John Thoms, in 1842, in 1846 and (with illustrations) in 1876. An edition based on that of 1598, edited by Henry Morley, was published in 1889 and has been reprinted on several occasions since.

A critical edition, based on that of 1603 and edited in two volumes by C. L. Kingsford, was published in 1908 and republished with additional notes in 1927. This remains the standard scholarly edition. A more popular single-volume edition was published in Everyman's Library, with an introduction by H. B. Wheatley, in 1912 (revised edition 1956) and has been frequently reprinted.

== Manuscripts and collections ==
Many of Stow's own autograph manuscripts are now held in the British Library, notably in the Harley Collection; and others in the Bodleian Library. Some in Lambeth Palace Library (MS 306) were published in 1880 by the Camden Society, edited by James Gairdner, as Three Fifteenth Century Chronicles, with Historical Memoranda by John Stowe the Antiquary, and Contemporary Notes of Occurrences written by him.

The manuscript and printed works that made up his library are now scattered, but can often be identified through the many annotations he made to them.

== Commemoration and legacy ==
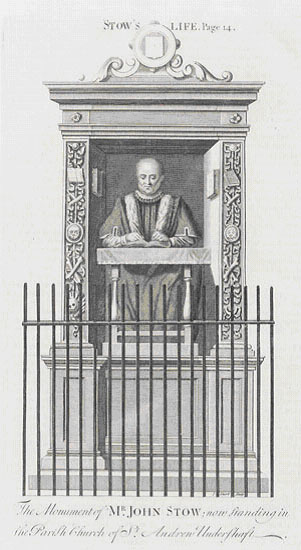
An 18th-century engraving of Stow's monument

Stow's widow commissioned a mural monument to him in St Andrew Undershaft, made of Derbyshire marble and alabaster. The work has been tentatively attributed to Nicholas Johnson. It includes an effigy of Stow, which was originally coloured: he is represented seated at a desk, writing in a book (probably the revision of his Annales, which he continued to 26 March, ten days before his death), and flanked by other books. Above him is the motto, based on an epigram of Pliny the Younger, Aut scribenda agere, aut legenda scribere ("[Blessed is he to whom it is given] either to do things that are worth writing about, or to write things that are worth reading about"). The figure holds a real quill pen, in a manner similar to the effigy of William Shakespeare at Stratford-upon-Avon: the latter monument has been attributed, on equally tentative grounds, either to Nicholas Johnson's brother, Gerard, or more recently to Nicholas himself.

In acknowledgement of Stow's continuing reputation as the founding father of London history, the quill held by his effigy has been periodically renewed. The renewal is mentioned as taking place "annually" in 1828; and, although the custom may later have fallen into abeyance, it was revived following the monument's restoration by the Merchant Taylors' Company in 1905. In 1924, the ceremony was incorporated into a special church service, with an address by a London historian; and this service continued to be held annually every April until 1991, including the years of the Second World War. No services could be held in 1992 or 1993 because of damage to the church caused by the Baltic Exchange bomb of 1992. The service was revived in 1994, but from 1996 to 2017 was held only once every three years. The service due to take place in 2020 was cancelled because of the COVID-19 pandemic, and the next service took place in 2024. The services are jointly sponsored by the Merchant Taylors' Company and the London and Middlesex Archaeological Society, with the quill supplied by the society. The exchange of the quill is undertaken by the Lord Mayor of London or the Master Merchant Taylor alternately.

Stow's Survey of London lends its title to the Survey of London, a comprehensive multi-volume architectural survey of the former County of London, founded in 1894 and still in progress.
