= Edmund Howes =

English chronicler

- Died: 1631
- Occupation: Chronicler

Edmund Howes (fl. 1607–1631), was an English chronicler.

== Biography ==
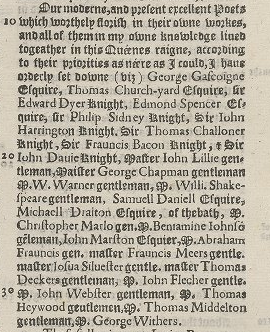
William Shakespeare described as both poet and gentleman in Howes' 1615 update to Stow's Chronicle

Howes lived in London, and designated himself "gentleman". Undeterred by John Stow's neglect, and despite the ridicule of his acquaintances, he applied himself on Stow's death in 1605 to continuations of Stow's Abridgement and of his Annales. The former he undertook, after discovering (he tells us) that no one else was likely to perform it. Howes's first edition of Stow's Abridgement, or Summary of the English Chronicle, appeared in 1607. A dedication to Sir Henry Rowe, the lord mayor, a few notices of "sundry memorable antiquities", and a continuation of matters "foreign and domestically" between 1603 and 1607, constitute Howes's contributions. In 1611 Howes issued another edition of the same work, with a further continuation to the end of 1610, and a new dedication addressed to Sir William Craven, lord mayor.

Howes issued in 1615 an expanded version of Stow's well-known Annales or Chronicle, with an historical preface, and a continuation from 1600, the date of the last edition, to 1615. According to Howes's own account, Archbishop Whitgift had suggested this task to him, and he received little encouragement while engaged on it. In 1631 he published his final edition of the Annales, with a dedication to Charles I, and a concluding address to the lord mayor and aldermen of London. Howes lays much stress on his love of truth, and the difficulties caused him in his labours by "venomous tongues". In a letter to Nicholas, dated 23 December 1630, he refers to the passage of his work through the press, and mentions Sir Robert Pye as a friend. There was a further 1631 edition of the Annales, with Howes's additions.
