= Elizabeth Purslowe =

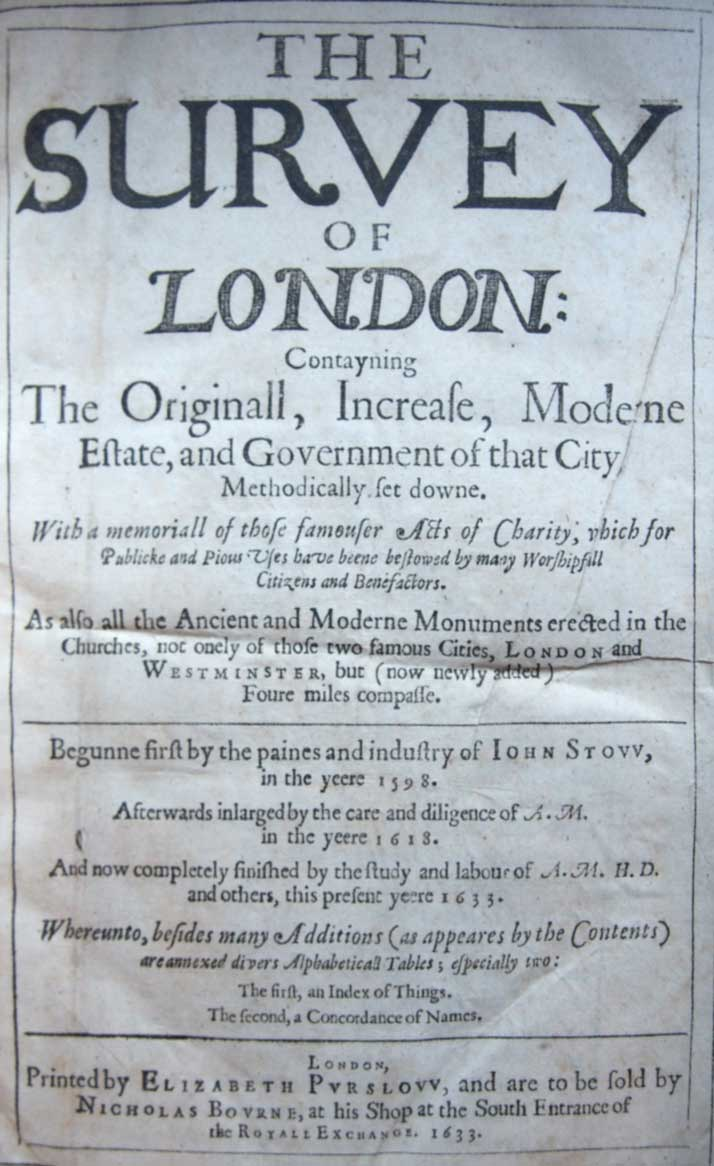
- 1633 John Stow's Survey of London
- Born: unknown
- Died: c.1656
- Occupation: printer
- Known for: leading a publishing company
- Spouse: George Purslowe
- Children: two
- Parent: unknown

Elizabeth Purslowe (fl. 16- c, 1656 ) was an English person involved in the 17th century publishing trade. She was one of the first women to be recognised as a master printer and she lost this privilege for publishing books that did not support the King's views.

== Life ==
Purslowe came to notice in 1632 when her husband died. Her husband had been apprenticed between 1602 and 1609 and he had been recognised as a master printer in 1614 when he took over Simon Stafford's equipment and business. He then had an established printing business and they were married by 1622. They had at least two sons as they are known to have become adults.

After 1632 she ran the business and she was on the list of master printers. We know this because her name was removed from the list for publishing a radical text that did not support the Laudianist (Royalist) approach to church politics. Her son was allowed to take her place and he joined the Stationer's Company in 1640 even though he was still an apprentice. Irrespective he and his mother continued to support the distribution of radical texts. Elizabeth's name continued to appear in the company's published books.

Notably she published, "Juvenilia: or Certain Paradoxes and Problems" by John Donne and plays by Philip Massinger and John Ford, In 1633 she published the fourth edition of John Stow's Survey of London.

== Death and legacy ==
The date of her death is unknown but she received a valuable pension and this stopped in 1656. She is credited with printing over 160 books. Scholar Helen Smith notes that Purslowe printed at least 164 books after her husband's death, and that this number 'dwarfs that of many male printers' at the time. Purslowe's contribution to radical printing is considered to be more than contemporary history acknowledges. Her printing business continued passing down through the family. It was led at several points by a woman including Elizabeth's daughter-in-law.
