= Gerard Johnson (sculptor) =

17th-century English sculptor

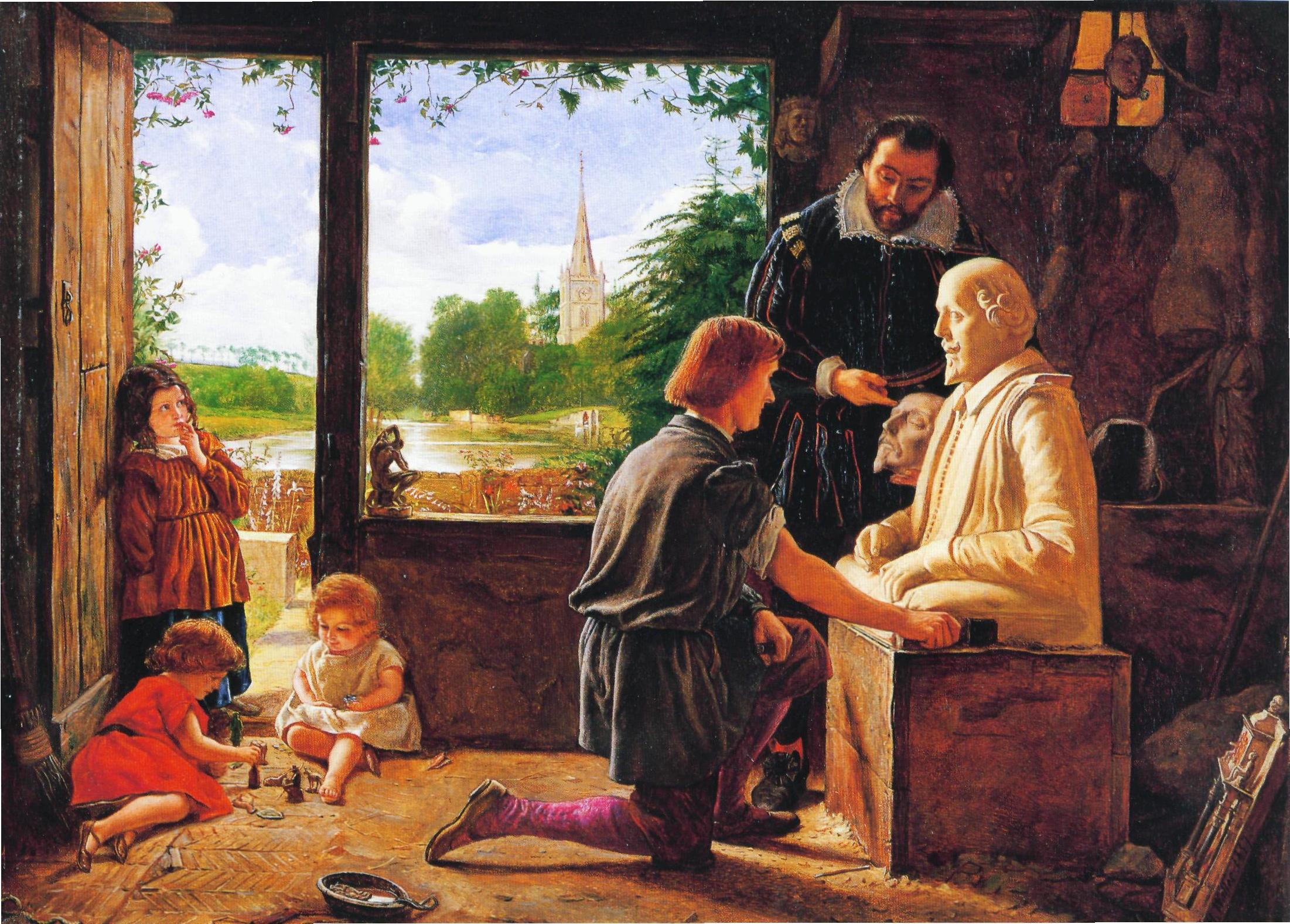
An imaginary scene painted in 1857 by Henry Wallis depicting Gerard Johnson carving the monument, while Ben Jonson shows him Shakespeare's death mask

Gerard Johnson Jr. (Dutch: Gheerart Janssen; fl. 1612–1623) was a sculptor working in Jacobean England who is traditionally supposed to have created Shakespeare's funerary monument (although this attribution has more recently been challenged). In May 1612 Johnson was paid for making part of a fountain for the east garden at Hatfield House, Hertfordshire.

His father, then known as Gheerart Janssen, came to England in 1567 from Holland. He established himself as a sculptor of funerary monuments in London. Gerard the elder worked on a monument to the 1st Earl of Southampton, which also depicts Shakespeare's patron, the 3rd Earl, as a young man. Shakespeare would probably have seen the monument if he had stayed at Titchfield.

Shaespeare's monument is in Holy Trinity Church, Stratford upon Avon, and may have been commissioned by his son-in-law John Hall. Dugdale states that the Gerard the younger created the memorial in Holy Trinity church to Shakespeare's friend John Combe, who left the playwright a legacy in his will. This would probably have been installed in 1615 while Shakespeare was still alive. It is also possible that Shakespeare knew the Johnson family from his London days, since their workshop was close to the Globe Theatre.

In 1849 a death mask of Shakespeare was made public by a German artist, Ludwig Becker, who linked it to a painting which, he claimed, depicted Shakespeare and resembled the mask. The mask, known as the "Kesselstadt death mask" was given publicity when it was declared authentic by the scientist Richard Owen, who also claimed that the Stratford memorial was based on it. The artist Henry Wallis painted a picture depicting the sculptor working on the monument while looking at the mask. The sculptor Lord Ronald Gower also believed in the authenticity of the mask. When he created the large public Shakespeare statue in Stratford in 1888, he based the facial features on it. He also attempted to buy it for the nation. The mask is now generally believed to be a fake, though its authenticity claim was revived in 1998.

In 2021, Lena Cowen Orlin challenged the attribution of Shakespeare's monument to Gerard Johnson, arguing that it was more probably by Gerard's brother, Nicholas Johnson, was commissioned by Shakespeare himself during his lifetime, and was sculpted from the life.

== Gallery ==
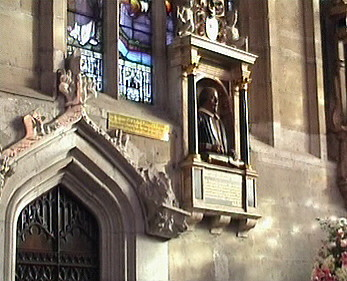
The monument in situ

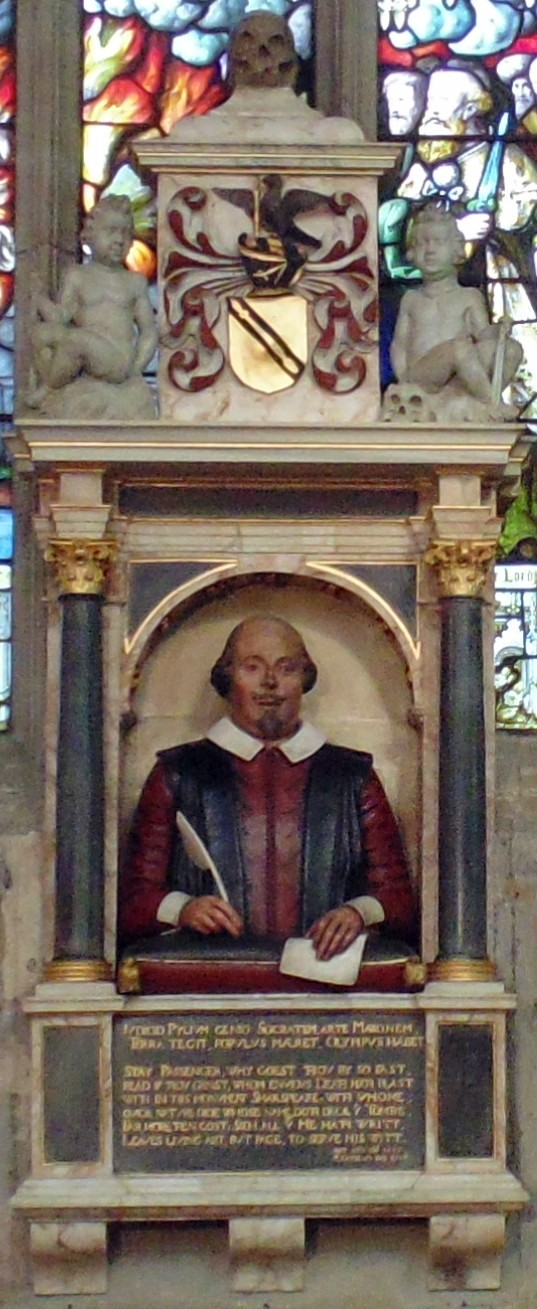
Close-up of the sculpture

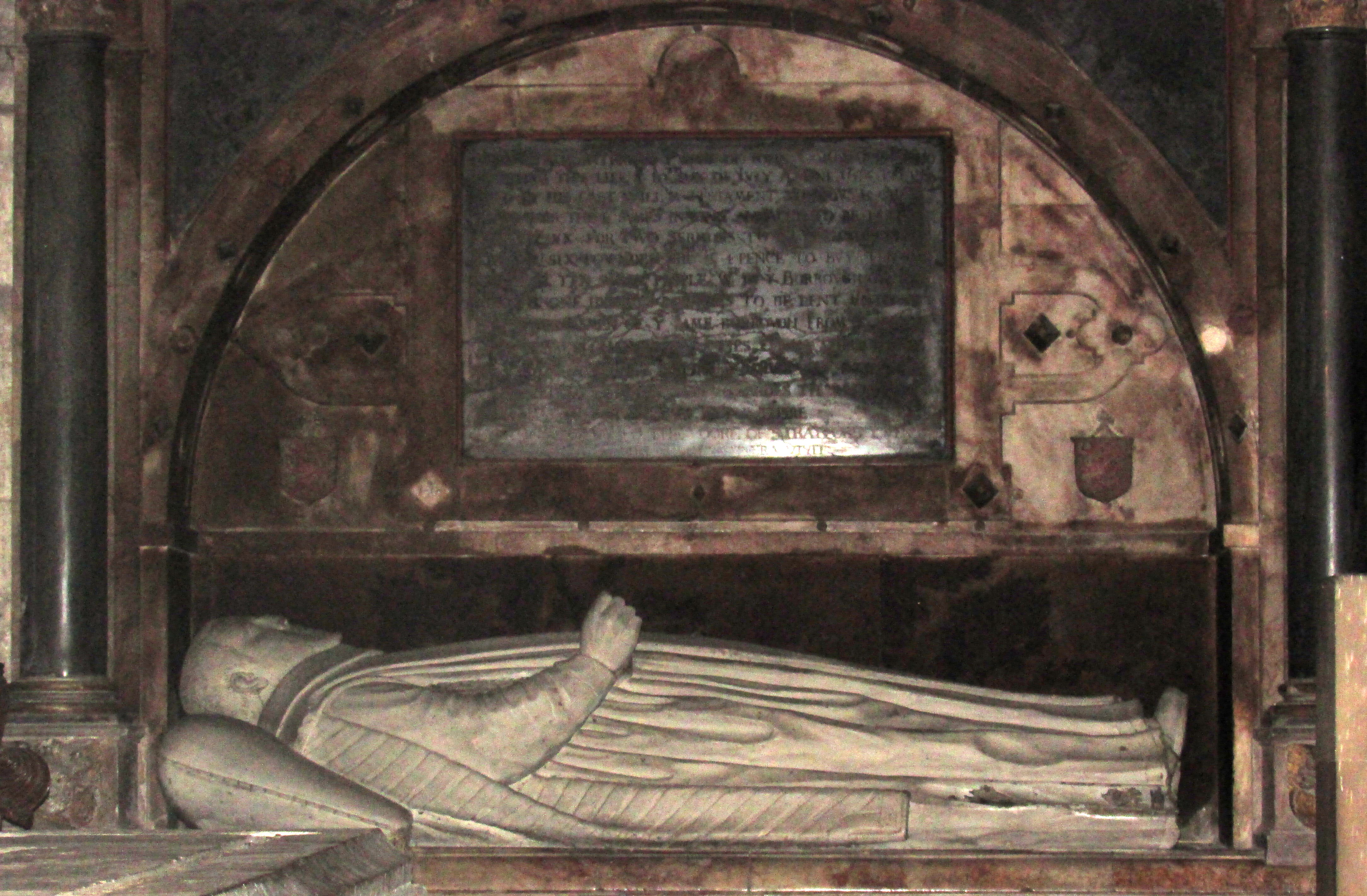
The tomb of John Combe
