= Shakespeare's funerary monument =

Monument in Stratford-upon-Avon

Coordinates: 52°11′12″N 1°42′27″W

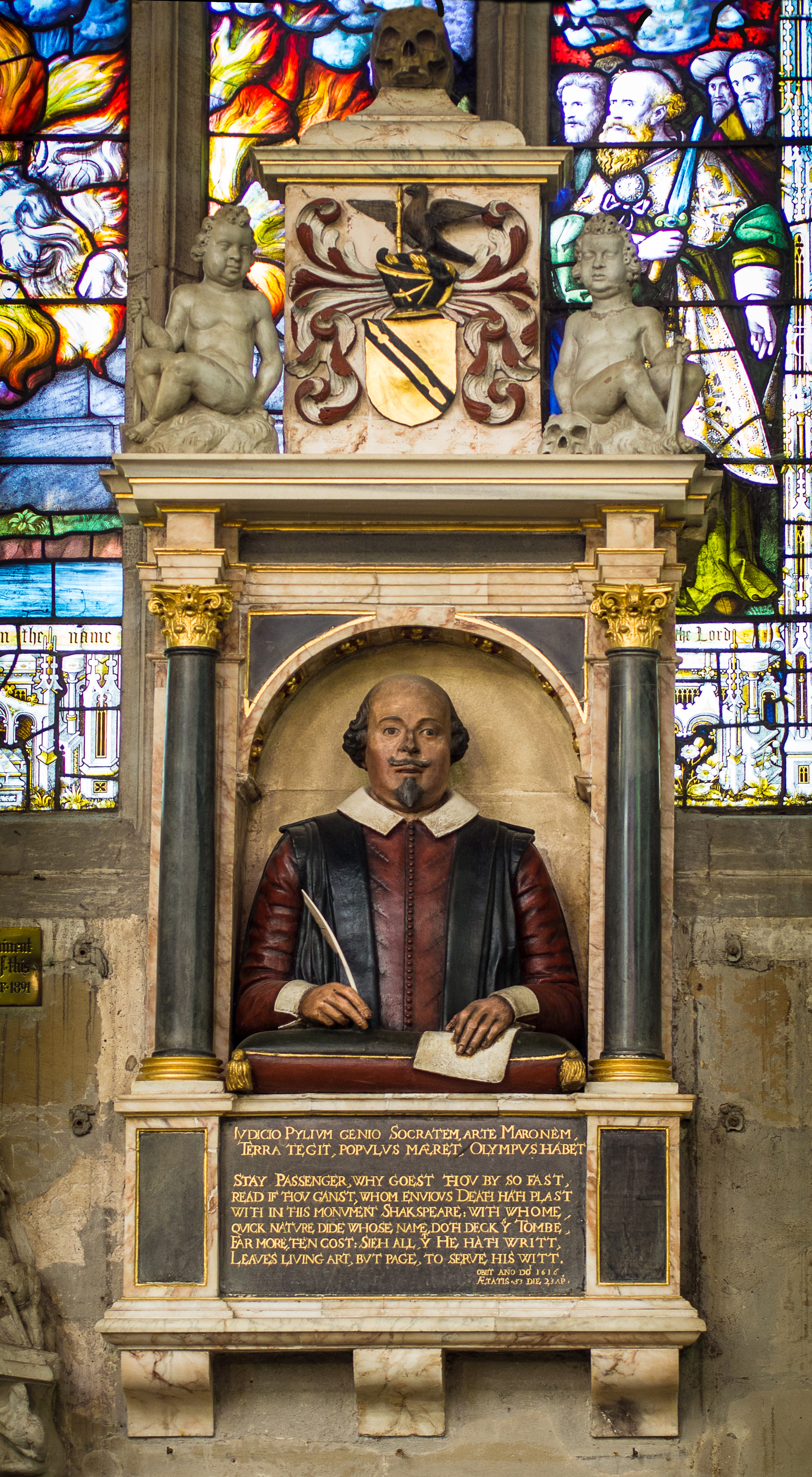
Shakespeare's funerary monument, Holy Trinity Church, Stratford

The Shakespeare funerary monument is a memorial to William Shakespeare located inside Holy Trinity Church at Stratford-upon-Avon in Warwickshire, the church in which Shakespeare was baptised and where he was buried in the chancel two days after his death. The monument, carved in pale blue limestone, is mounted on the north wall of the chancel. It has traditionally been identified as the work of the sculptor Gerard Johnson, but this attribution is challenged by Lena Cowen Orlin, who argues that it was more likely modelled from life by Gerard's brother, Nicholas Johnson.

The monument features a demi-figure of the poet holding a real quill pen in one hand and a piece of paper resting on a cushion in the other. The style, which was popular from the early- to the mid-17th century, was most commonly used to memorialize divines, academics, and those professions with pretensions of learning. The buttoned doublet, with its ornamental slashes, was probably originally painted scarlet, the loose subfusc gown black, the eyes hazel, and the hair and beard auburn. It has been retouched many times, and was painted entirely white in 1793. This demi-figure is one of only two representations definitely accepted as accurately portraying William Shakespeare's physical appearance. The monument is topped with strapwork rising to a heraldic shield displaying Shakespeare's arms, on either side of which sits an allegorical figure: one, representing Labour, holds a spade, the other, representing Rest, holds an inverted torch and a skull.

The two columns that support the entablatures and coat-of-arms above the bust are of black polished marble. The two putti and the skull are of sandstone, and the capitals and bases of the columns are of gilded sandstone. The architraves, frieze and cornice were originally of red-veined white alabaster, but they were replaced in 1749 with white marble. The effigy and the cushion are carved of one piece of bluish Cotswold limestone, and the inlaid panels are of black touchstone.

The date the monument was erected is not known exactly, but it must have been before 1623; in that year, the First Folio of Shakespeare's works was published, prefaced by a poem by Leonard Digges that mentions "thy Stratford moniment" [sic]. John Weever transcribed the monument inscription and grave epitaph, and H. R. Woudhuysen's analysis of the undated manuscript suggests that his visit to Stratford was made not much later than 1617–18. The monument was restored in 1748–49 and has been repainted several times.

== Inscriptions ==
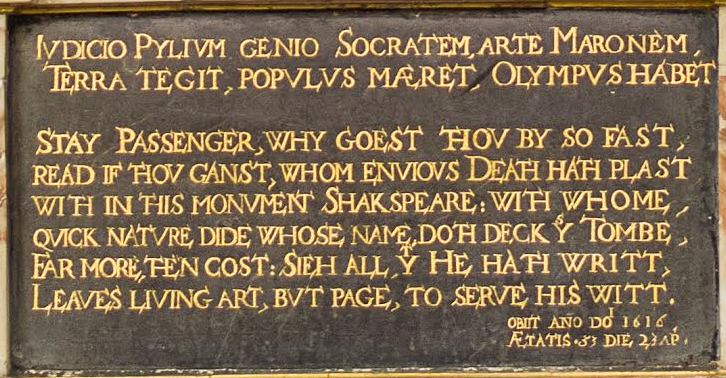
The memorial plaque on Shakespeare's monument

Beneath the figure is engraved an epitaph in Latin and a poem in English. The epitaph reads:

IVDICIO PYLIVM, GENIO SOCRATEM, ARTE MARONEM,
TERRA TEGIT, POPVLVS MÆRET, OLYMPVS HABET

The first line translates as "A Pylian in judgement, a Socrates in genius, a Maro in art", comparing Shakespeare to Nestor the wise king of Pylos, the Greek philosopher Socrates, and the Roman poet Virgil (whose last name or cognomen was Maro). The second reads "The earth covers him, the people mourn him, Olympus possesses him", referring to Mount Olympus, the home of the gods.

The English poem reads:

STAY PASSENGER, WHY GOEST THOV BY SO FAST,

READ IF THOV CANST, WHOM ENVIOVS DEATH HATH PLAST
WITH IN THIS MONVMENT SHAKSPEARE: WITH WHOME,
QVICK NATVRE DIDE: WHOSE NAME, DOTH DECK Y^{S} TOMBE,
FAR MORE, THEN COST: SIEH ALL, Y^{T} HE HATH WRITT,

LEAVES LIVING ART, BVT PAGE, TO SERVE HIS WITT.

As modernized in The Oxford Shakespeare:

Stay, passenger, why goest thou by so fast?

Read, if thou canst, whom envious death hath placed
Within this monument: Shakespeare, with whom
Quick nature died; whose name doth deck this tomb
Far more than cost, sith [since] all that he hath writ

Leaves living art but page to serve his wit.

Stanley Wells is one of the few biographers to comment on the poem, saying that it "somewhat cryptically calls on the passer-by to pay tribute to his greatness as a writer", and admitting "the only sense I can make out of the last bit is that his compositions relegate the sculptor's art to the rank of a mere page – with perhaps a forced pun on the writer's 'pages' – offering service to his genius; or perhaps that all art subsequent to Shakespeare's is a page – servant – to his." Wells also points out that "his name does not deck the tomb, and it's not a tomb anyway", suggesting that it may have been originally designed to be part of a free-standing tomb.

Beneath the poem, in smaller lettering, an inscription gives the details of his death in abbreviated Latin: "died the year of the Lord 1616, in his 53rd year, on 23 April".

OBIIT AN̄O DO^{I} 1616
ÆTATIS٠53 DIE 23 AP^{R}.

== History ==
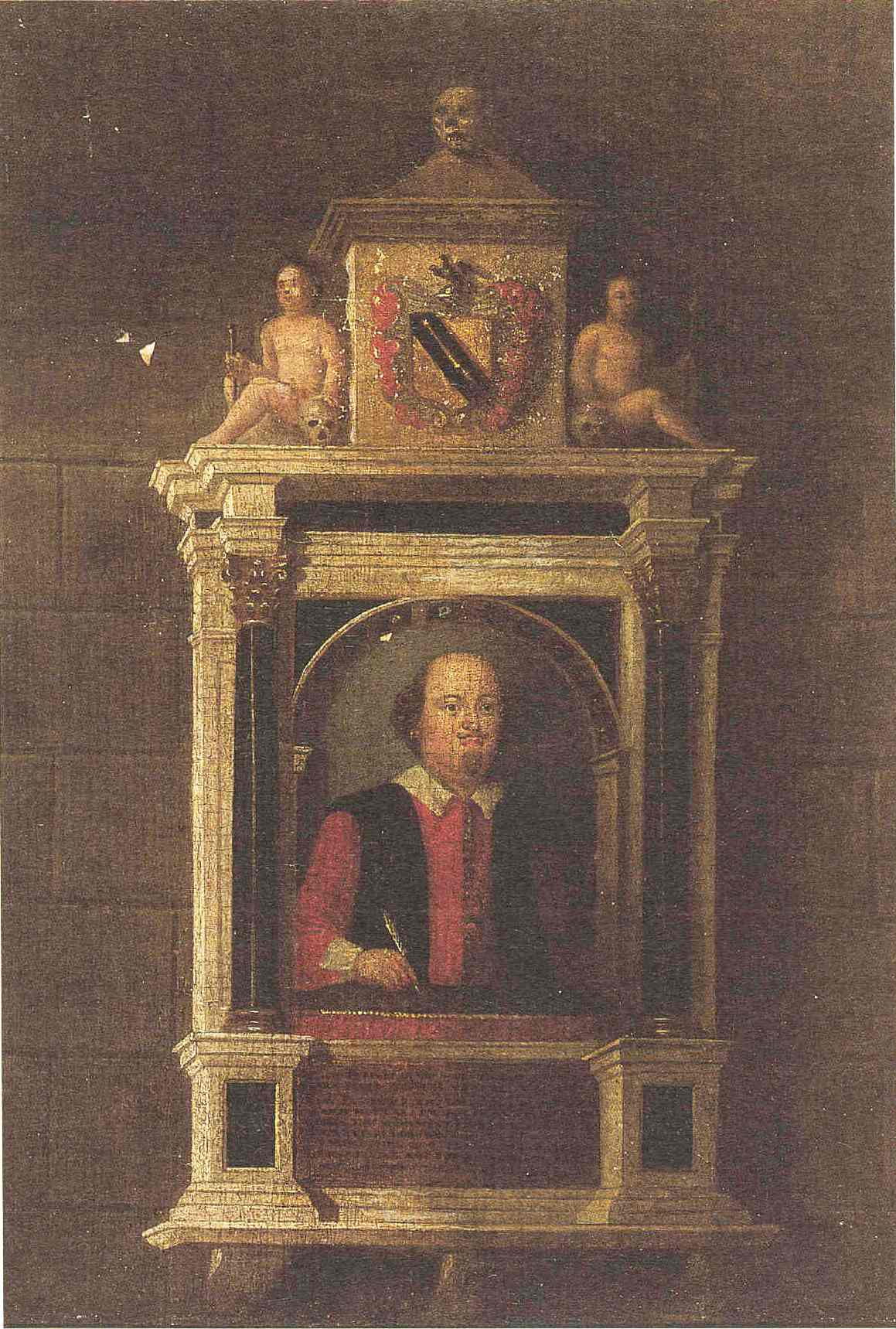
Painting of monument by limner John Hall made before its 1748–49 restoration

The monument was first illustrated and discussed in print in Sir William Dugdale's Antiquities of Warwickshire (1656) in which Dugdale wrote that Stratford "gave birth and sepulture to our late famous Poet Will. Shakespere, whose Monument I have inserted in my discourse of the Church." The engraving, almost certainly by Wenceslaus Hollar, was done from an original rough sketch made by Dugdale, probably in 1649, likely under the patronage of Shakespeare's granddaughter (and last living descendant), Elizabeth Barnard. Both depictions exhibit marked differences from the monument's modern appearance: the poet is not shown holding a quill or paper, and the cushion appears to be tipped up against his body. The art critic Marion Spielmann described it as giving the impression that Shakespeare was pressing the cushion to his groin, "which, for no reason, except perhaps abdominal pains, is hugged against what dancing-masters euphemistically term the 'lower chest'". The print was copied by later engravers.

In 1725, Alexander Pope's edition of Shakespeare's works included the first engraving of the monument's later look, made by George Vertue in 1723. A drawing of the monument in situ by Vertue also survives. An account by John Aubrey, written in the early 1670s (but possibly based on observations made a decade or two earlier), describes Shakespeare as wearing "a Tawny satten doublet I thinke pinked and over that a black gowne like an Under-gratuates at Oxford, scilicet the sleeves of the gowne doe not cover the armes, but hang loose behind".

The monument was restored in 1748–49. Parson Joseph Greene, master of Stratford grammar school, organised the first known performance of a Shakespeare play in Stratford to fund the restoration. John Ward's company agreed to perform Othello in the Town Hall on 9 September 1746, with all receipts going to help pay for the restoration.

Writing soon after the restoration, Greene wrote that "the figure of the Bard" was removed to be "cleansed of dust &c". He noted that the figure and cushion were carved from a single piece of limestone. He added that "care was taken, as nearly as could be, not to add to or diminish what the work consisted of, and appear'd to have been when first erected: And really, except changing the substance of the Architraves from alabaster to Marble; nothing has been chang'd, nothing alter'd, except supplying with original material, (sav'd for that purpose,) whatsoever was by accident broken off; reviving the Old Colouring, and renewing the Gilding that was lost". John Hall, the limner from Bristol hired to do the restoration, painted a picture of the monument on pasteboard before 1748. Greene also had a plaster cast of the head made before the restoration began.

Shakespeare's pen has been repeatedly stolen and replaced since, and the paint has been renewed. In 1793 Edmond Malone, the noted Shakespeare scholar, persuaded the vicar to paint the monument white, in keeping with the Neoclassical taste of the time. The paint was removed in 1861 and the monument was repainted in the colours recovered from beneath the white layer.

In 1973 intruders removed the figure from its niche and tried to chip out the inscription. Local police took the view that they were looking for valuable Shakespeare manuscripts, which were rumoured to be hidden within the monument. According to Sam Schoenbaum, who examined it after the incident, the figure suffered only "very slight damage".

== Interpretations ==
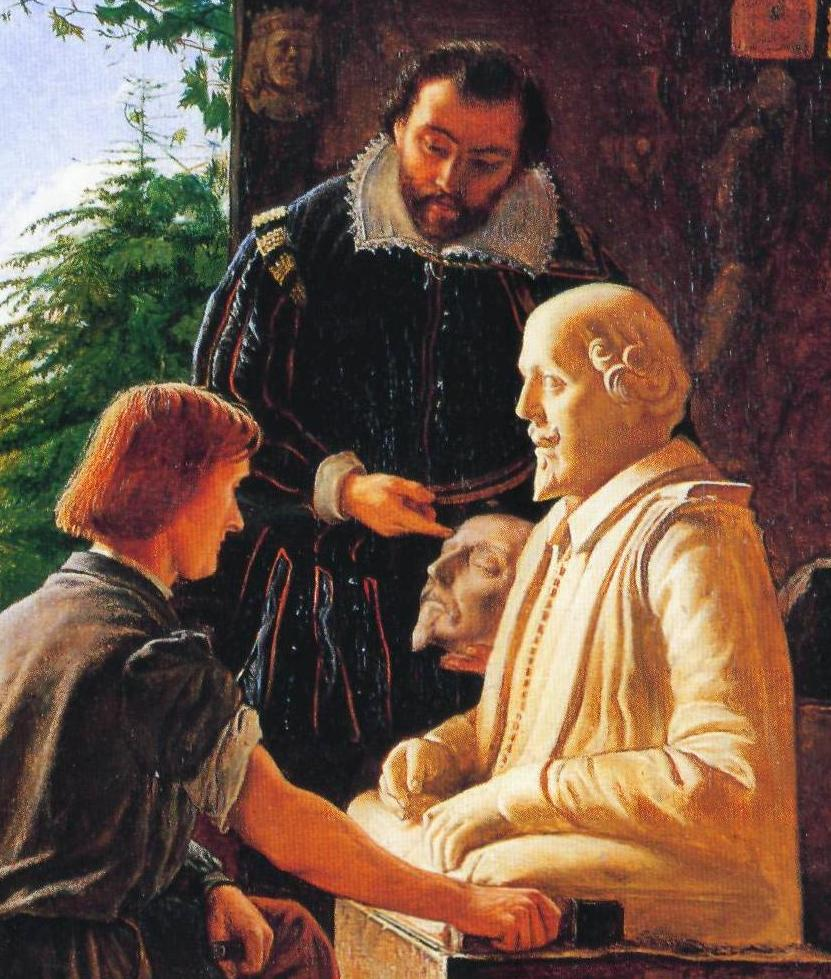
A fanciful 1857 painting by Henry Wallis depicting Gerard Johnson carving the monument, while Ben Jonson shows him Shakespeare's death mask

In the 1850s, the scientist Richard Owen argued that a death mask discovered in Germany by Ludwig Becker in 1849, known as the Kesselstadt Death Mask, was probably used by Gerard Johnson to model the face of the effigy. The mask had been claimed to be of Shakespeare because of a similarity to an alleged Shakespeare portrait Becker had bought two years earlier. This was depicted by the painter Henry Wallis in his imaginary scene portraying Ben Jonson showing the death mask to the sculptor. However, measurements of the mask and the monument figure did not correspond, most notably the bony structure of the forehead, and the idea was discredited. Though the Kesselstadt mask does not seem to fit, Park Honan asserts that the facial features of the monument do appear to have been modelled on a mask: "His eyes stare, the face is heavy and the nose is small and sharp. Because of the shrinkage of the muscles and possibly of the nostrils, the upper lip is elongated".

Lena Cowen Orlin, however, proposes that the monument may have been commissioned by Shakespeare himself, during his lifetime, from Nicholas Johnson; and that the effigy was sculpted from the life.

Critics have generally been unkind about the appearance of the sculpture. Thomas Gainsborough wrote that "Shakespeare's bust is a silly smiling thing". J. Dover Wilson, a critic and biographer of Shakespeare, once remarked that the Bard's effigy makes him look like a "self-satisfied pork butcher." Sir Nikolaus Pevsner pointed out that the iconographical type represented by the figure is that of a scholar or divine; his description of the effigy is "a self-satisfied schoolmaster".

Schoenbaum, however, says the monument is a typical example of Jacobean Renaissance style, and Spielmann says the "stiff simplicity" of the figure was more suitable for a sepulchral sculpture in a church than a more life-like depiction.

== Gallery ==
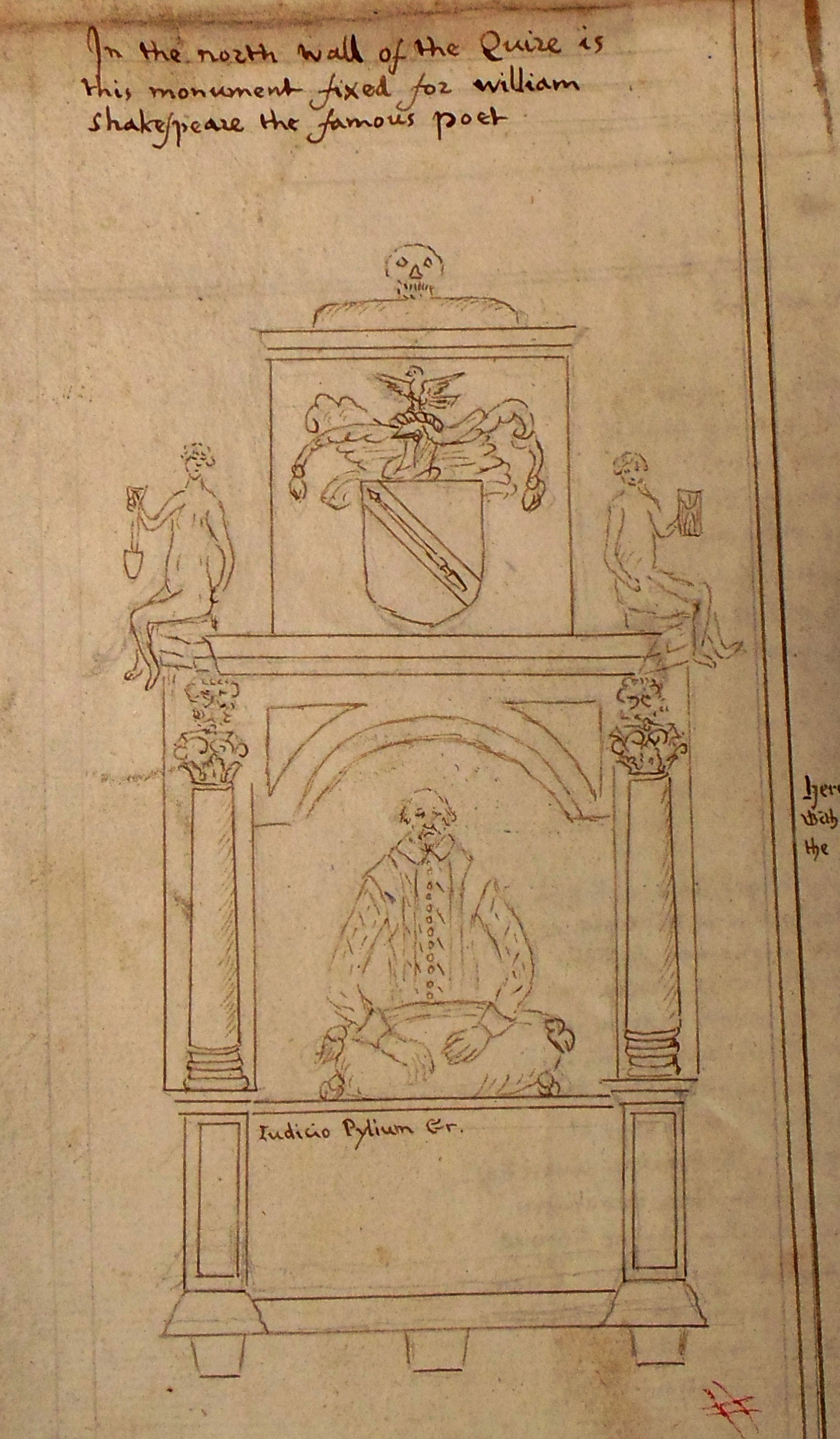
Sketch by William Dugdale, probably made in 1649, and afterwards used by Wenceslaus Hollar for his engraving in Dugdale's Antiquities of Warwickshire

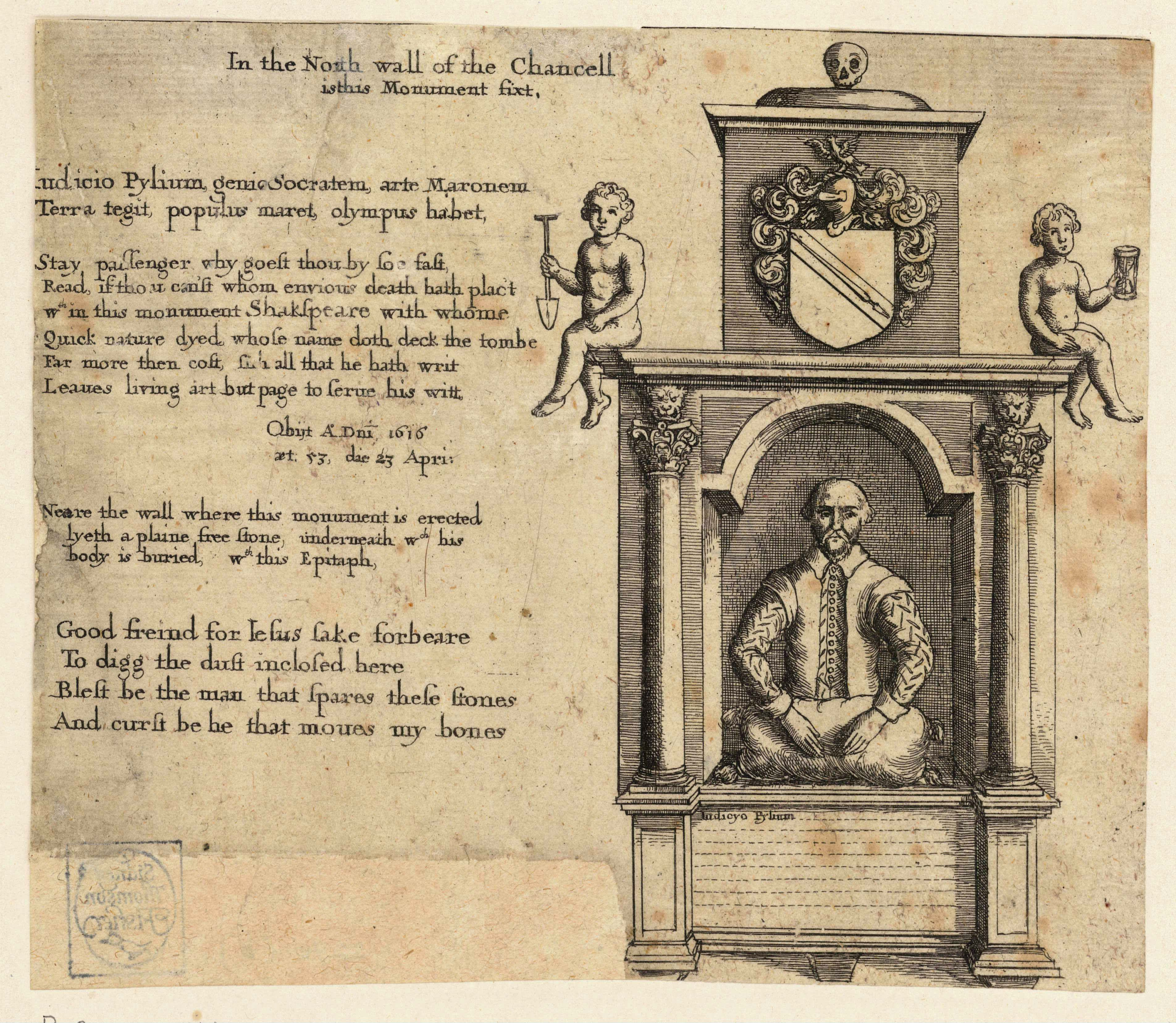
The first published illustration of the monument, in Dugdale's Antiquities of Warwickshire (1656), engraved by Hollar

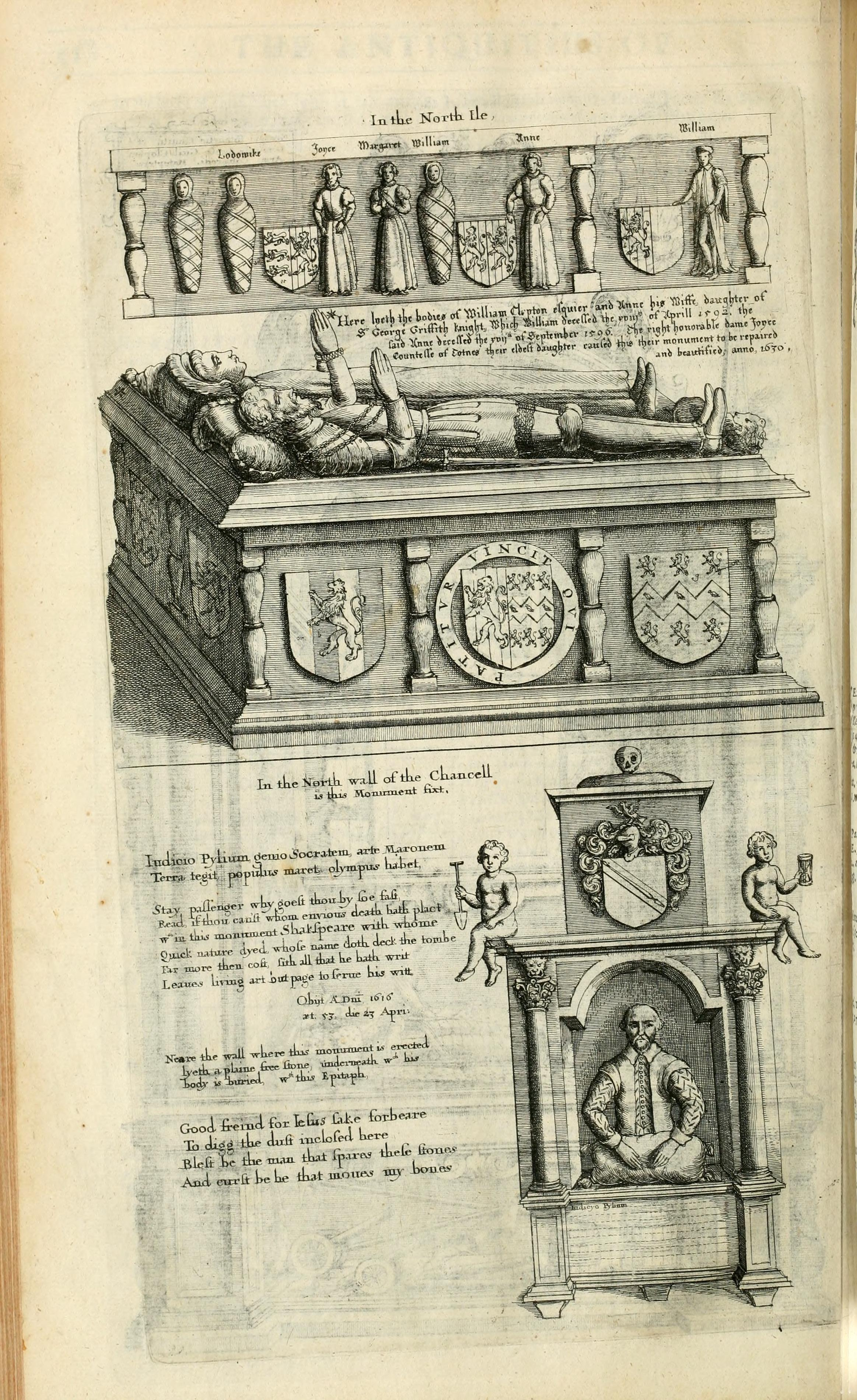
Hollar engraving in full context

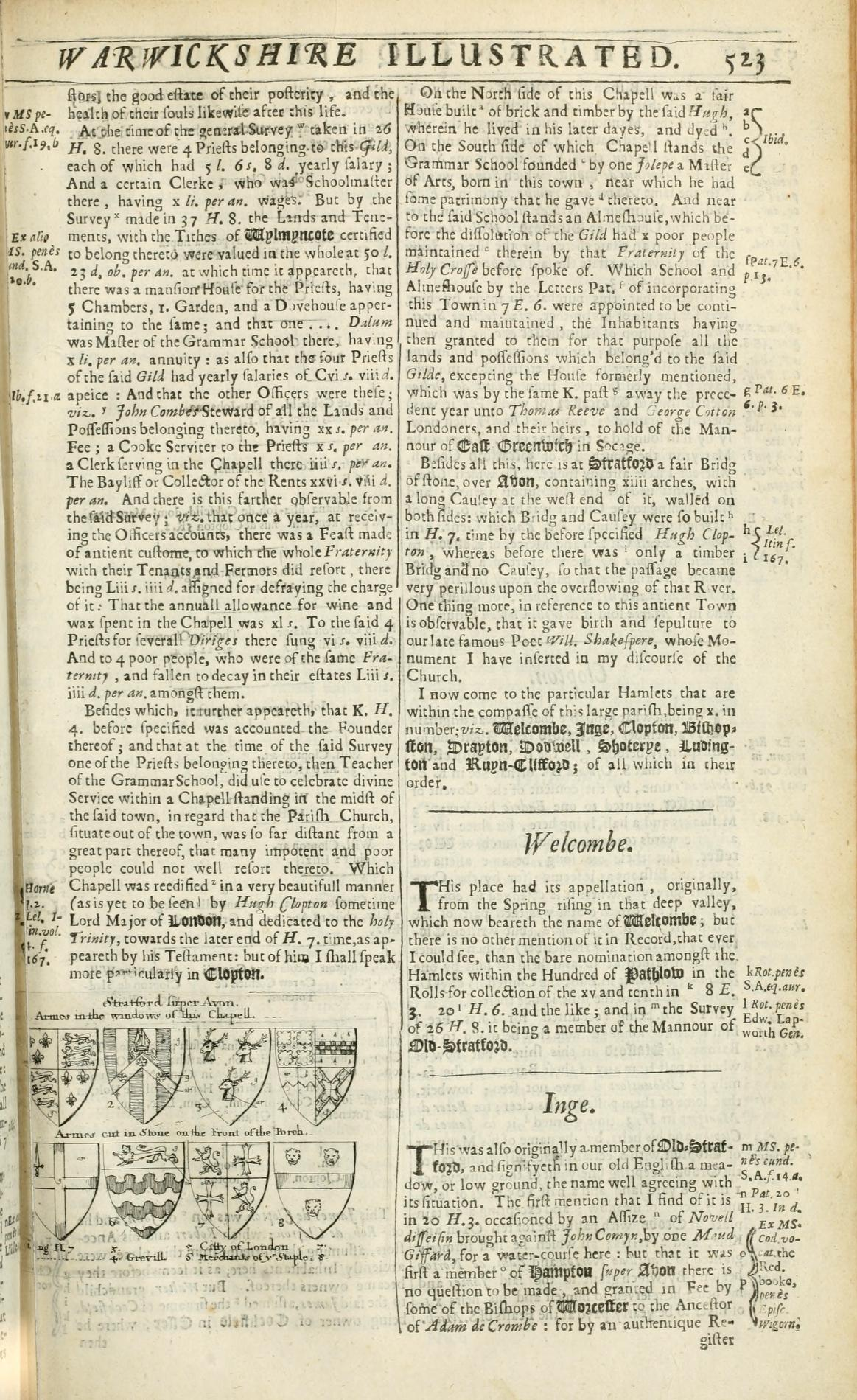
Later page in Dugdale identifying the above monument as that of "our late famous Poet Will. Shakespere", who was born and was buried in Stratford-upon-Avon

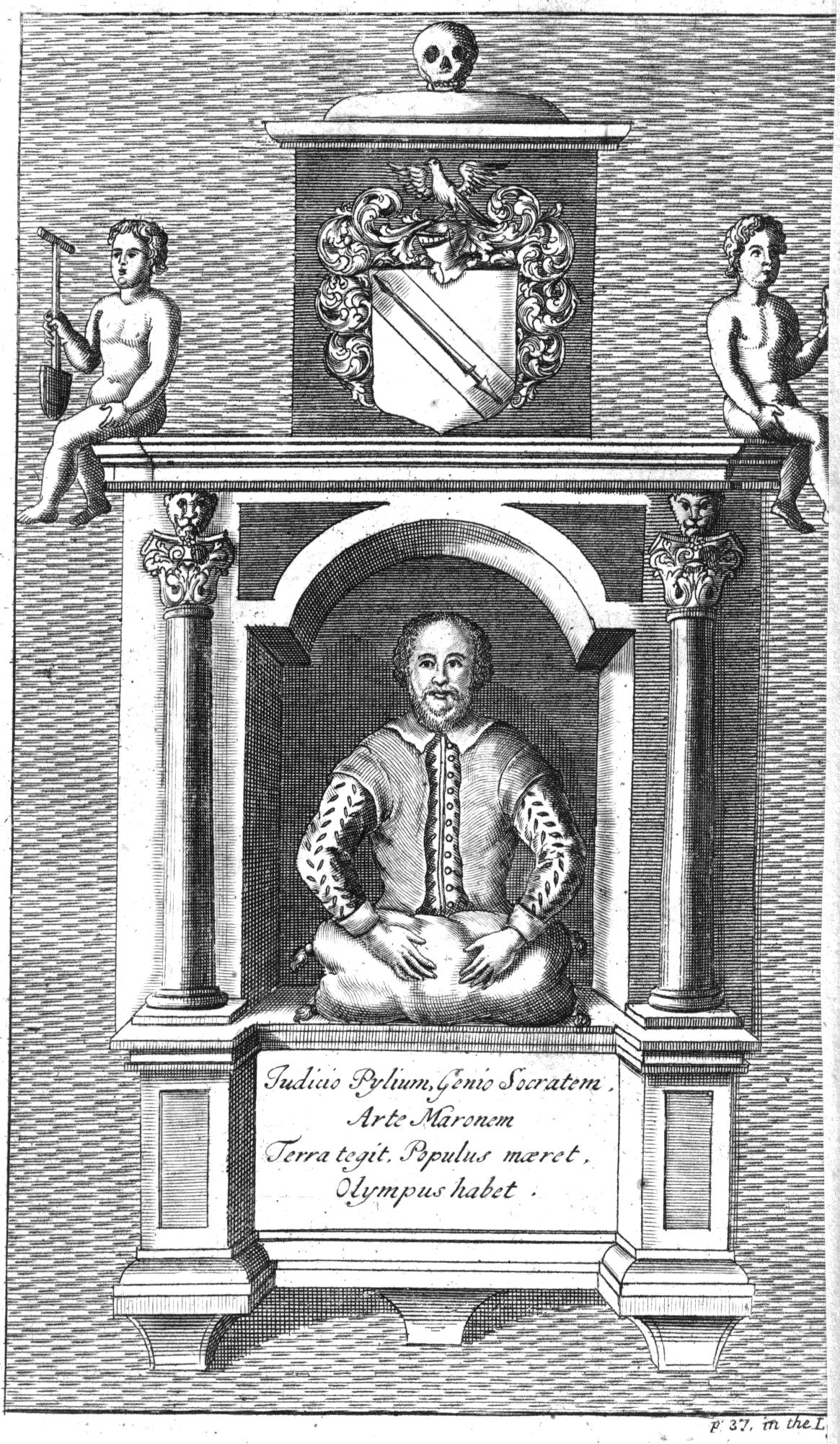
Michael Van der Gucht's engraving for Nicholas Rowe's Works of Mr. William Shakespear (1709), made from a plate copied from Hollar, as the reversed shadowing indicates

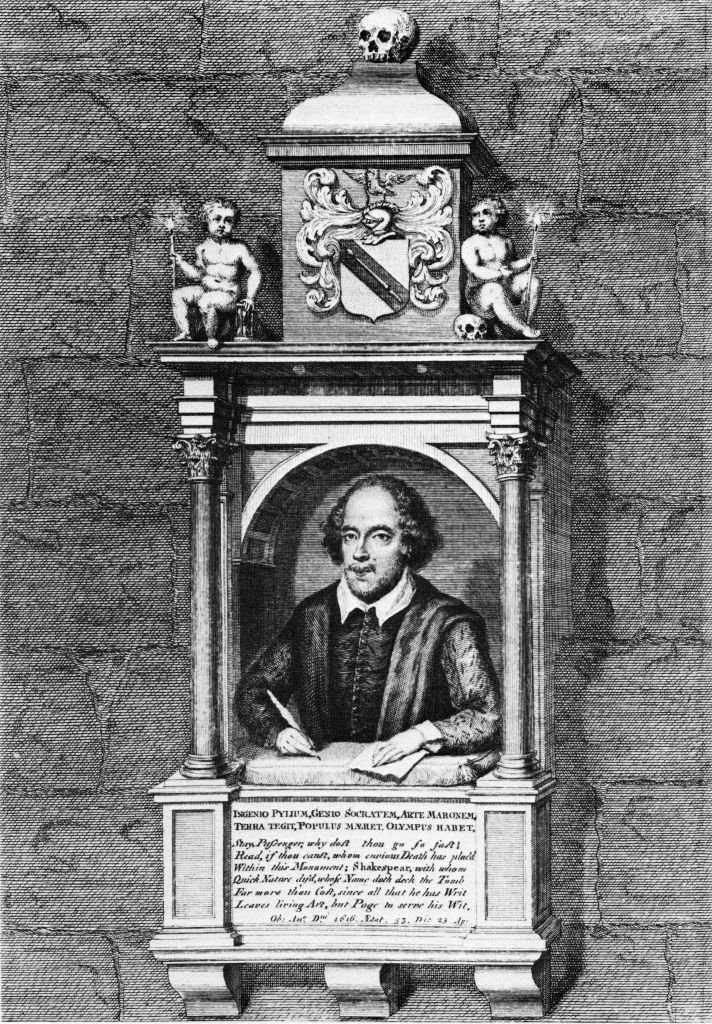
George Vertue's 1725 illustration for Pope's edition of Shakespeare's works, derived from his own drawing of the monument and the Chandos portrait

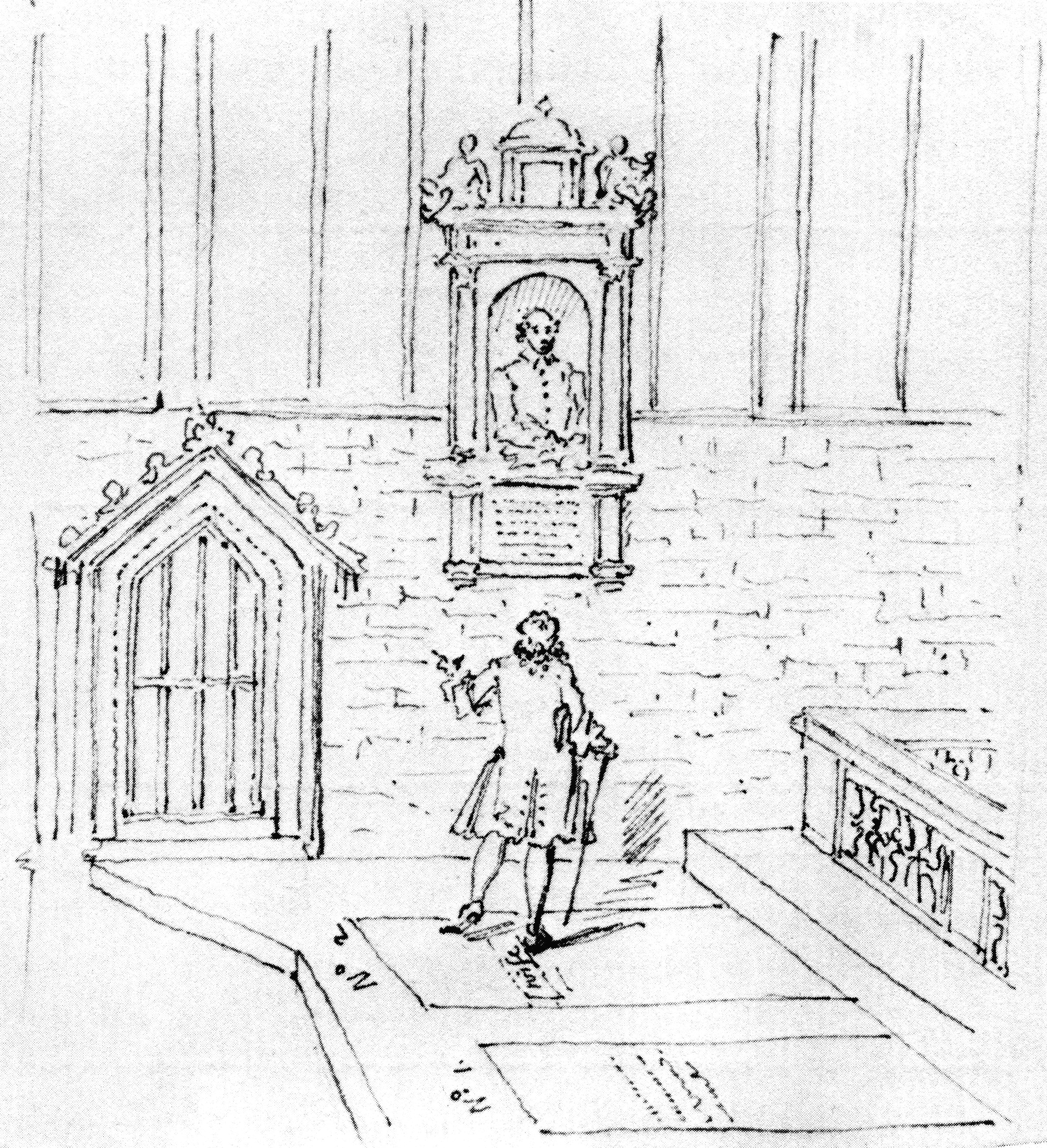
Sketch made by George Vertue in 1737

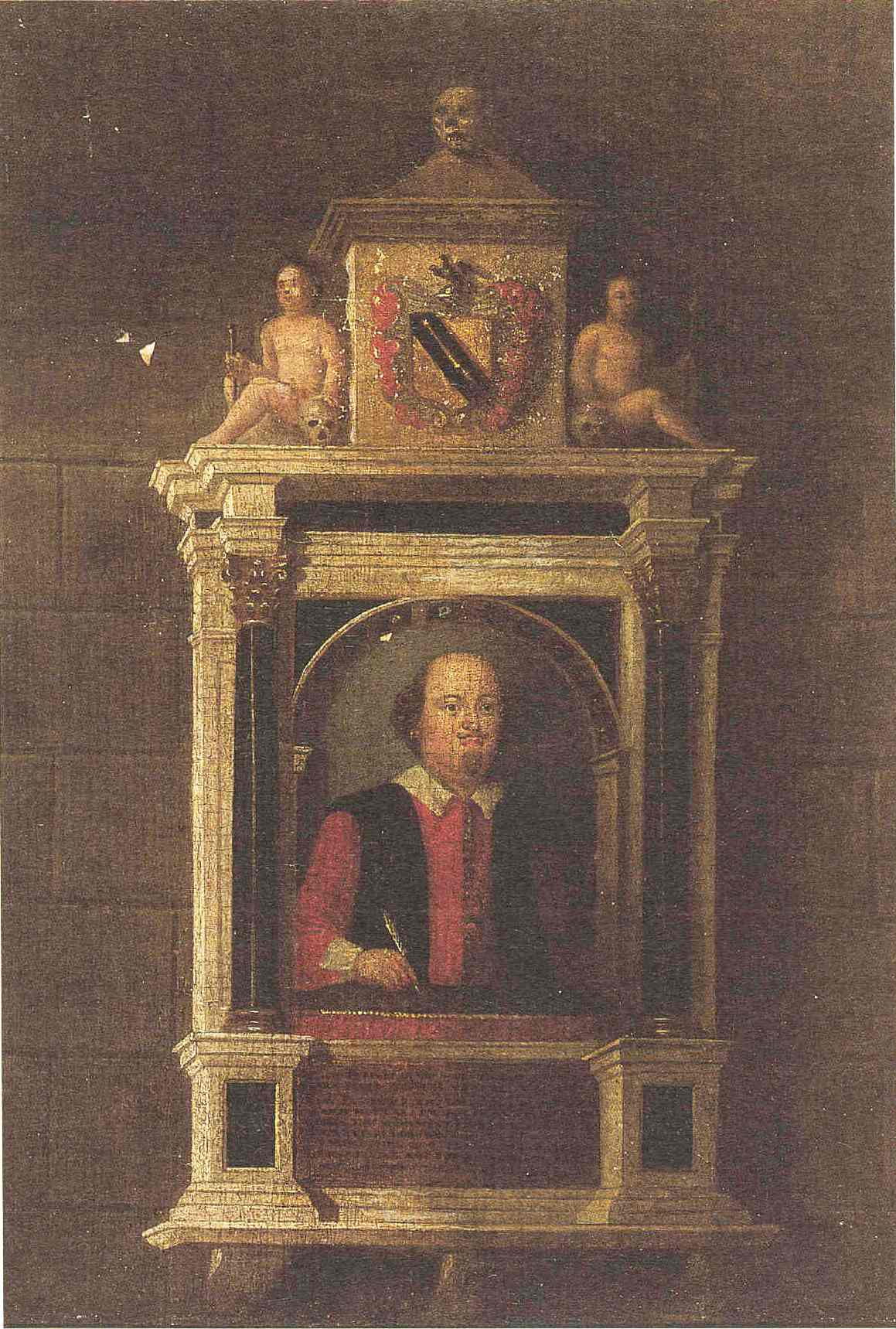
Painting of monument by limner John Hall made before its 1748–49 restoration

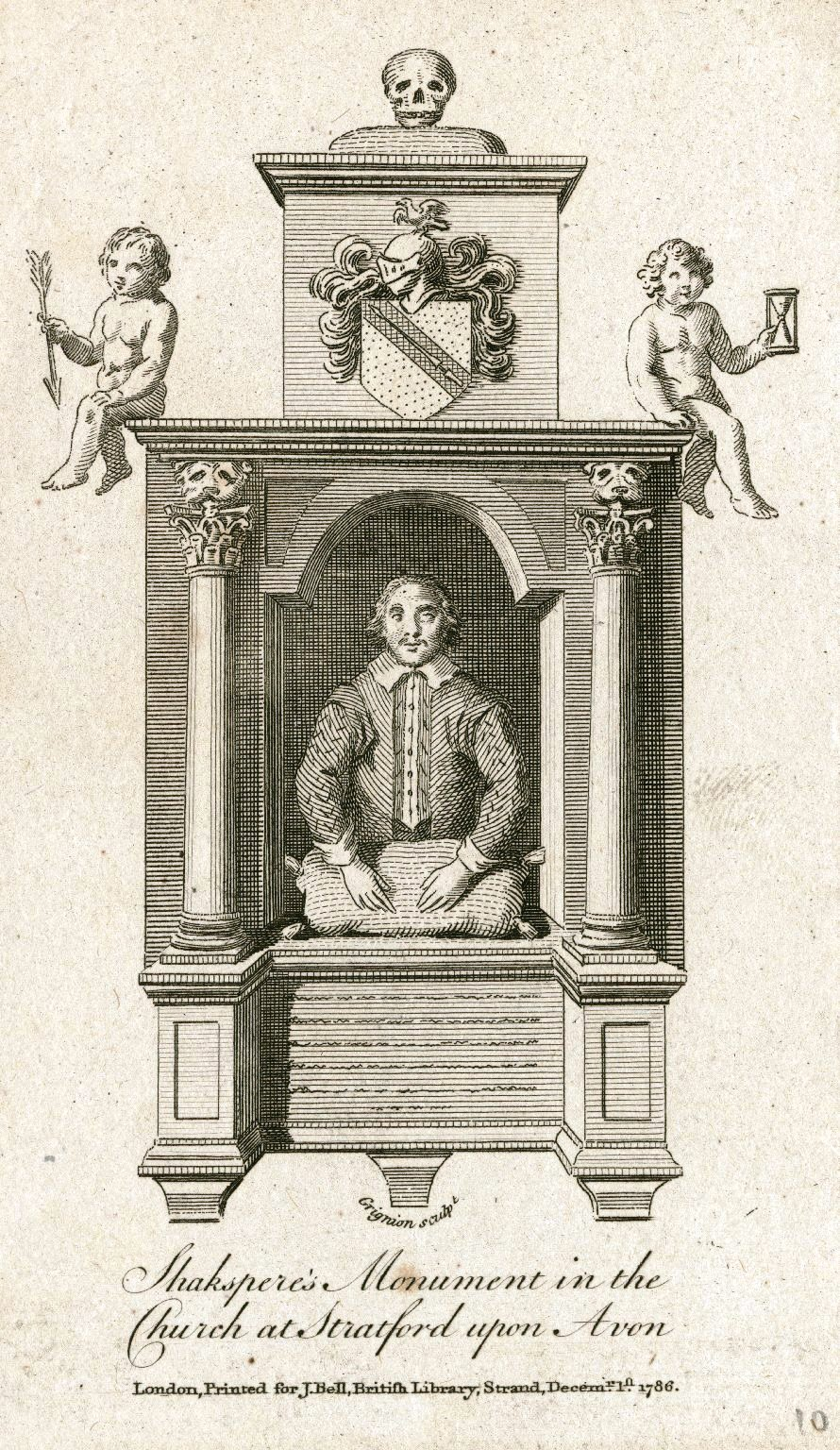
Engraving of Shakespeare's monument by Charles Grignion, derived from Hollar's engraving, first published in John Bell's 1786 edition of Shakespeare

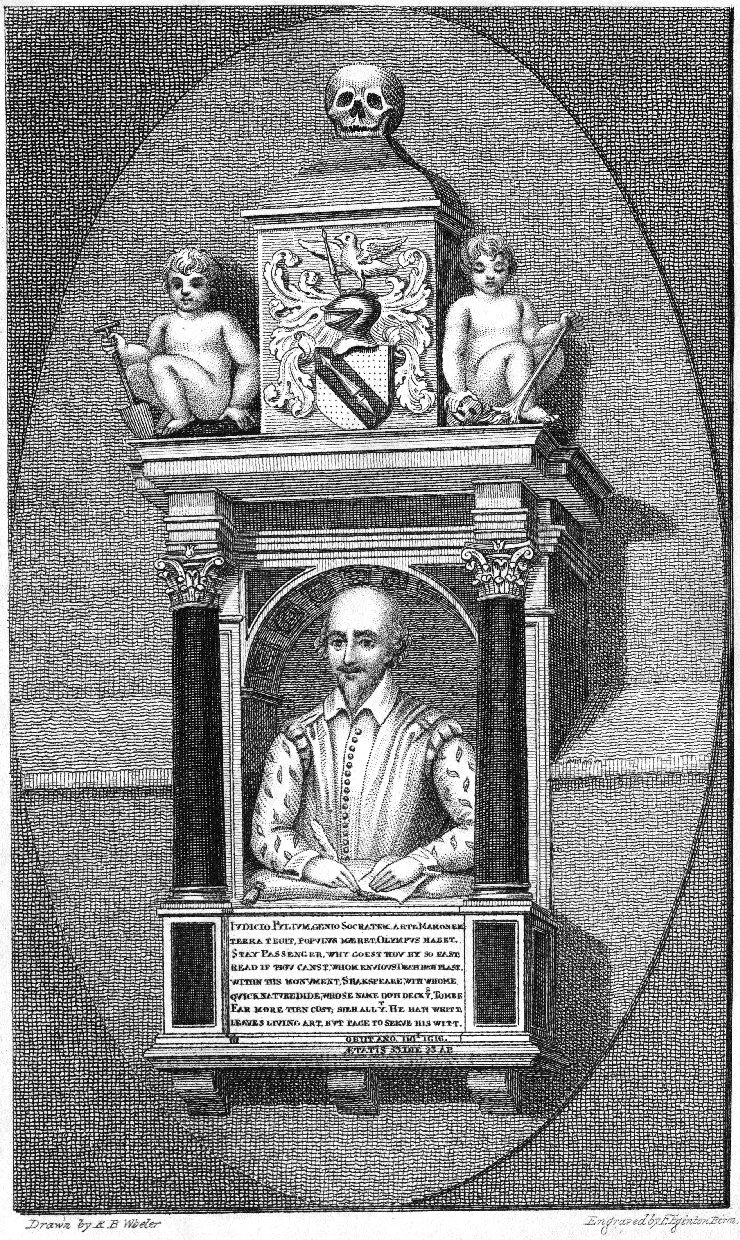
Engraving by Francis Eginton from a drawing by Robert Bell Wheler published in Wheler's History and Antiquities of Stratford-upon-Avon in 1806

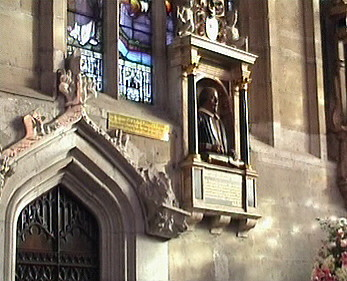
The immediate context of the monument

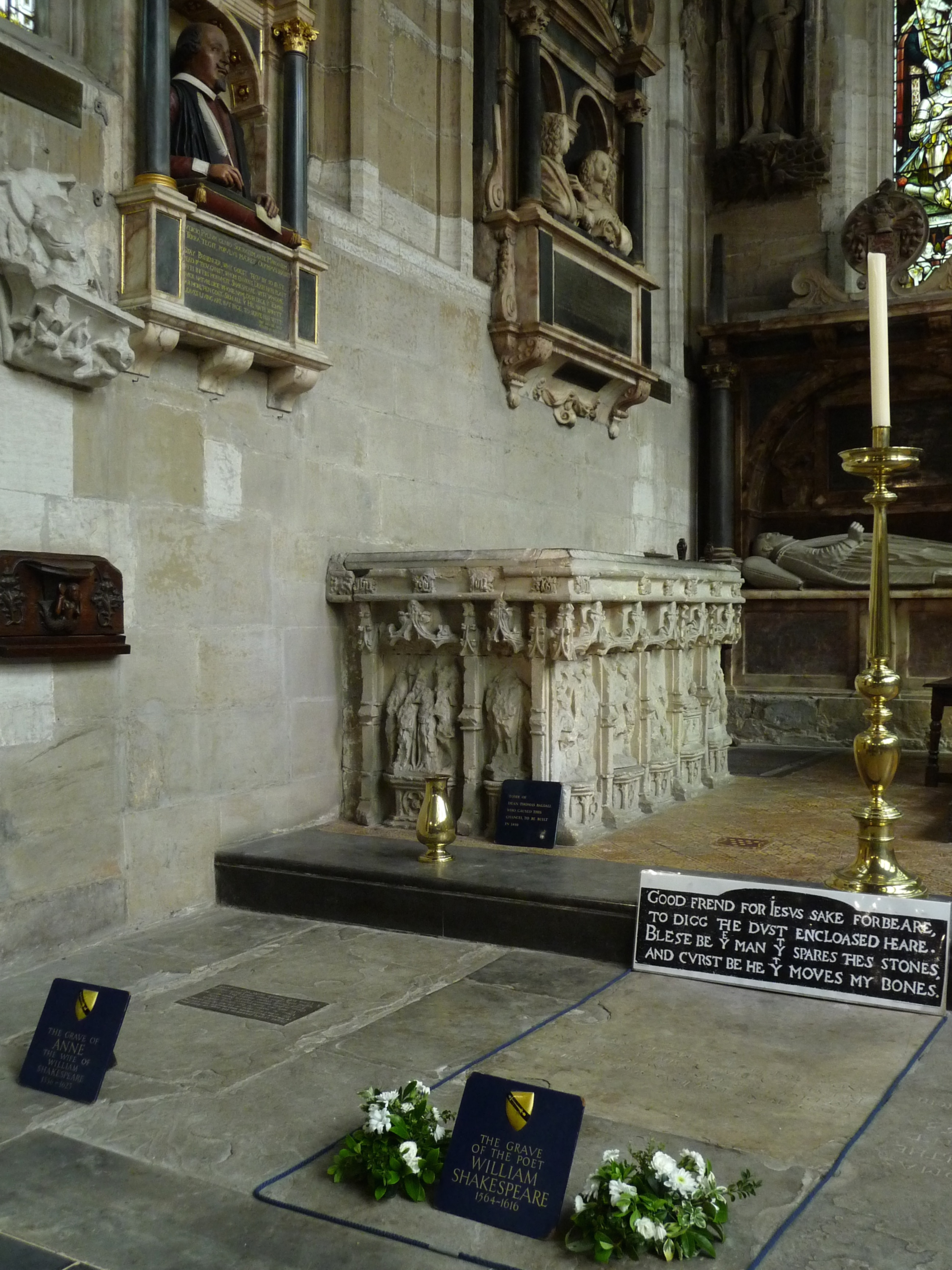
The wider context of the memorial, above the graves of Shakespeare and his wife

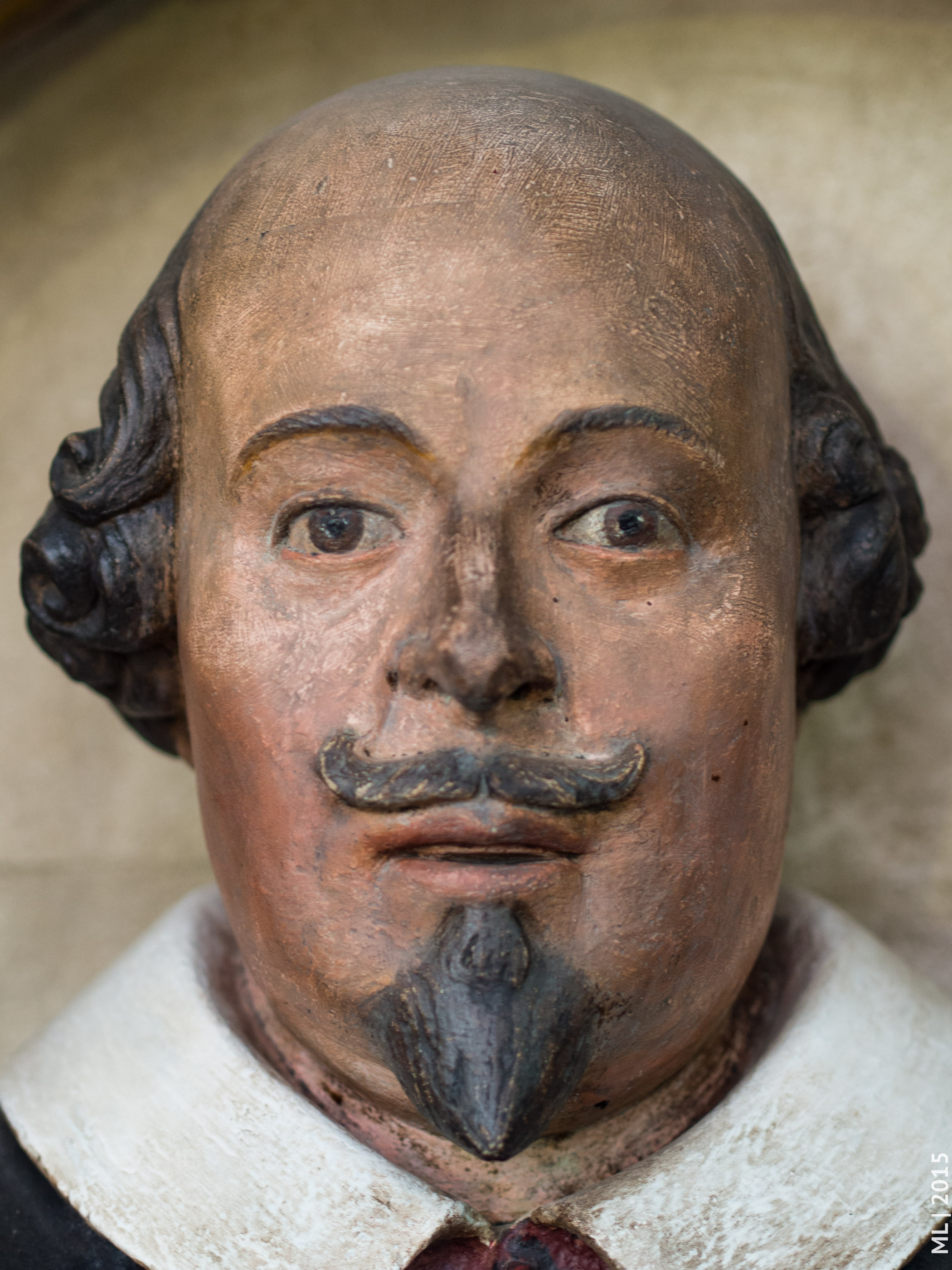
Close-up of features

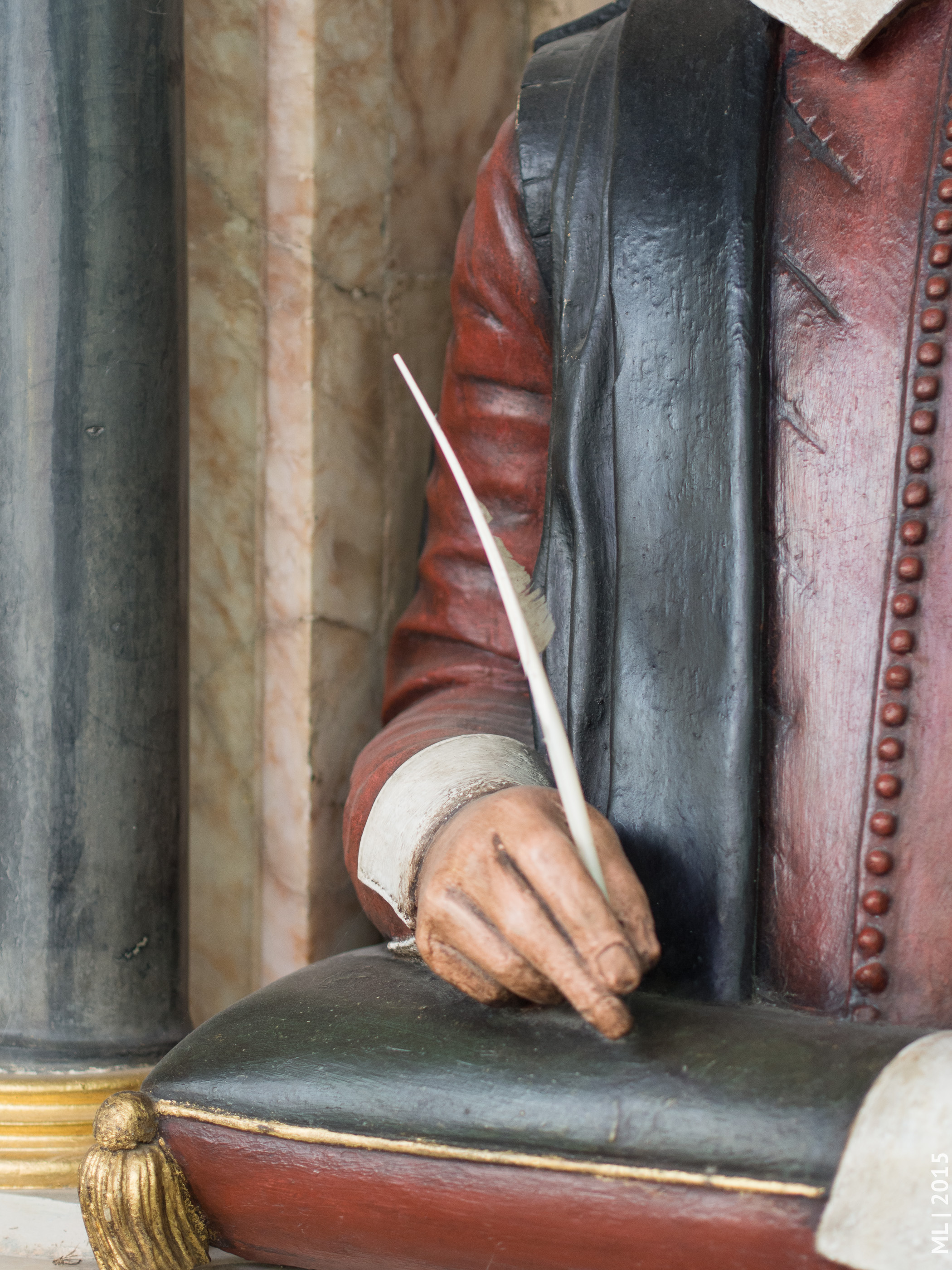
Close-up of hand and quill

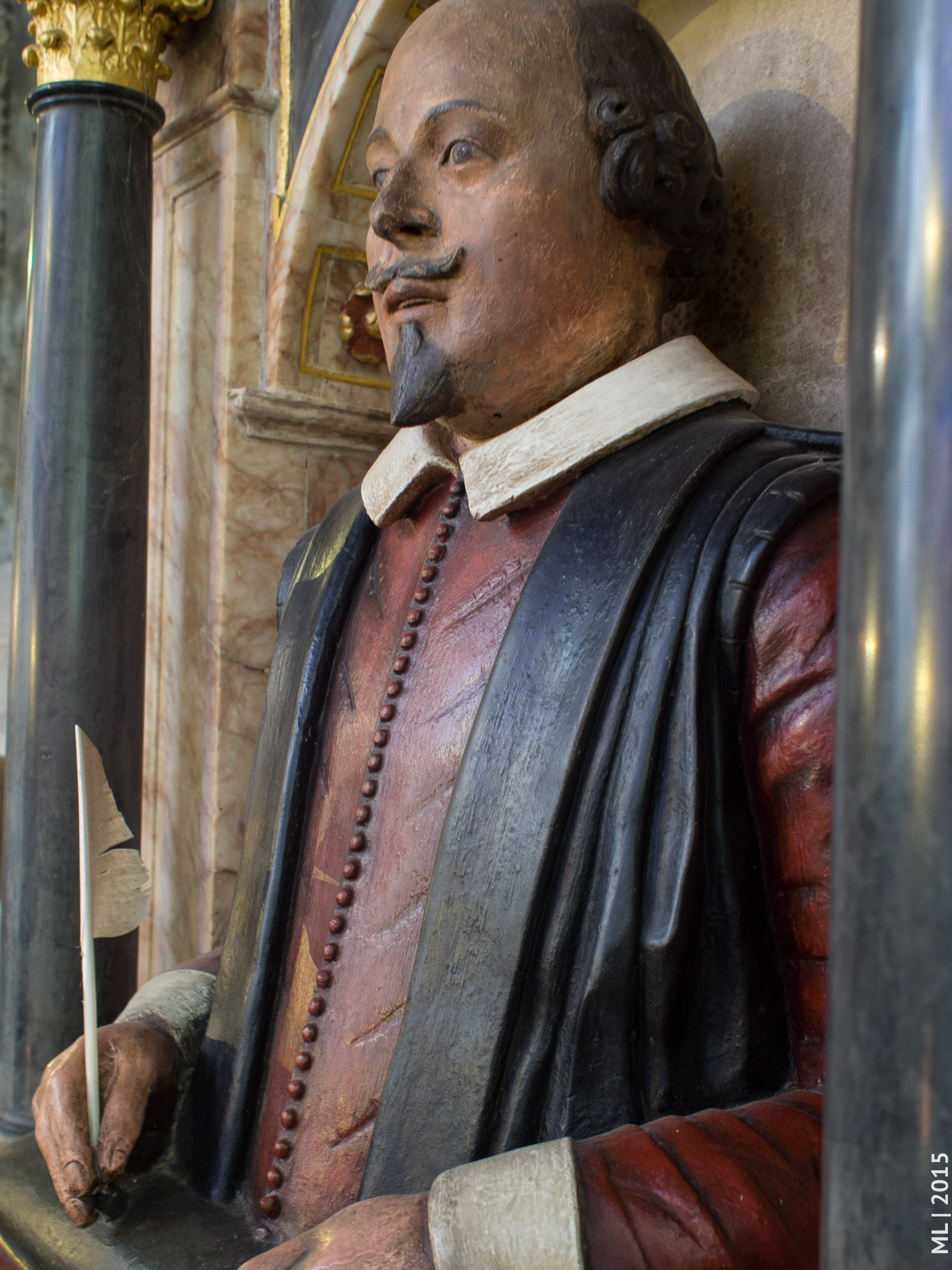
Profile from altar

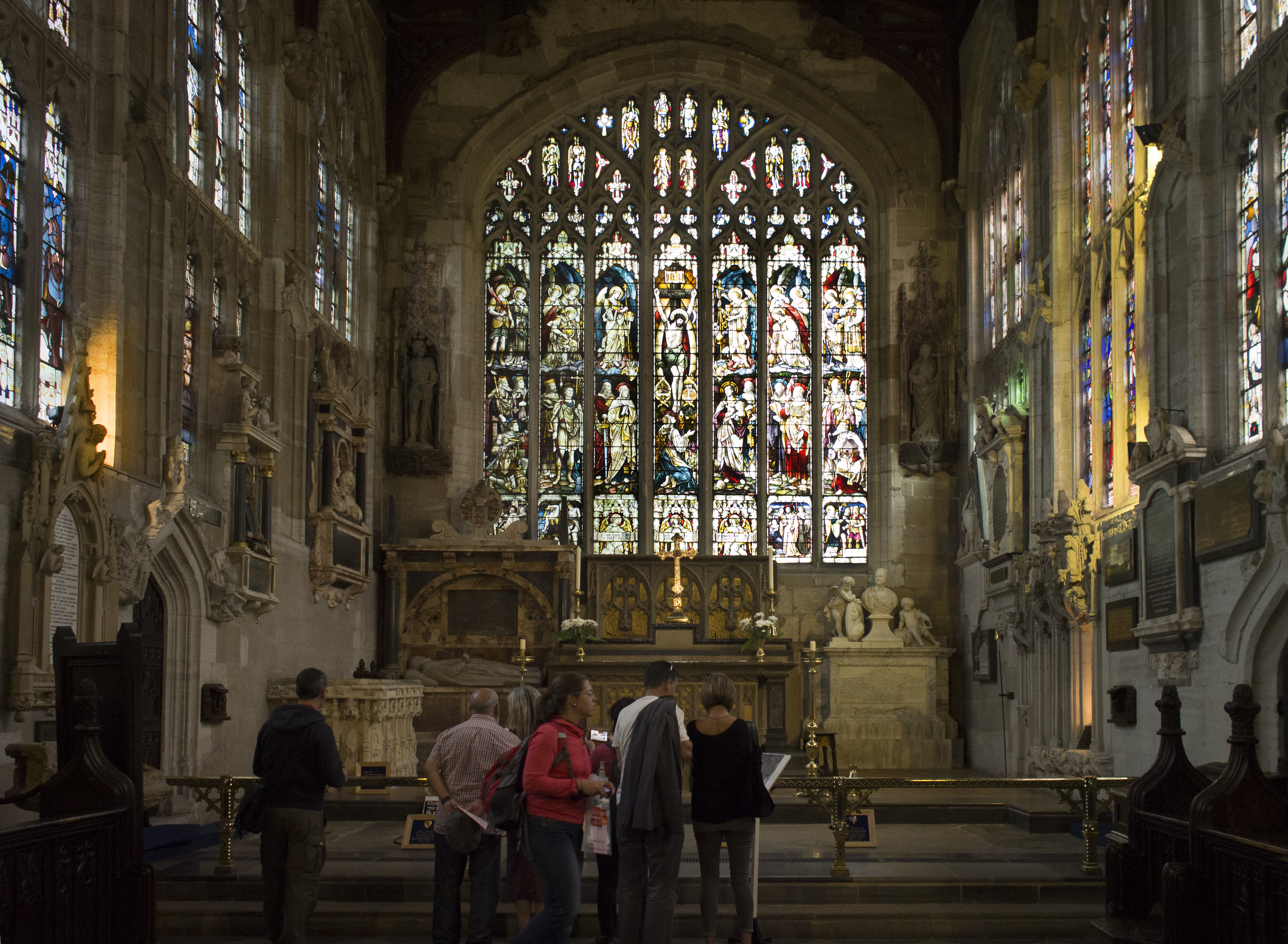
View of chancel of Holy Trinity Church, monument on left wall
