= Gheerart Janssen (sculptor) =

Anglo-Dutch sculptor

Gheerart Janssen (fl. 1568, died 1611), later known as Gerard Johnson Sr. or the Elder, was an English sculptor who operated a monument workshop in Elizabethan and Jacobean England and the father of Gerard Johnson the younger, who is thought to have created Shakespeare's funerary monument. He and Cornelius Cure became the leaders of the so-called Southwark school of monument design, which dominated the English market in the late-sixteenth century.

== Life ==
Johnson was born in Amsterdam. He became an English citizen in 1568 and Anglicized his name. Forbidden as an alien to live in the City of London, he settled across the Thames River in Southwark in the Bankside area, in which communities of Dutch and Flemish refugees flourished. Johnson married an English woman, Mary (or Marie), and had a family of five sons and a daughter. Two of the sons, Nicholas and Gerard, became sculptors and continued their father's monument business.

Johnson's workshop became a major monument supplier. In 1593 his workshop employed four journeymen and an apprentice, as well as an English assistant.

He died in 1611 and was buried on 30 July at St Saviour's, Southwark. Although it is known that he made some garden sculptor and a chimney piece, none of which survives, in his will he described himself as a "tombemaker".

== Notable works ==
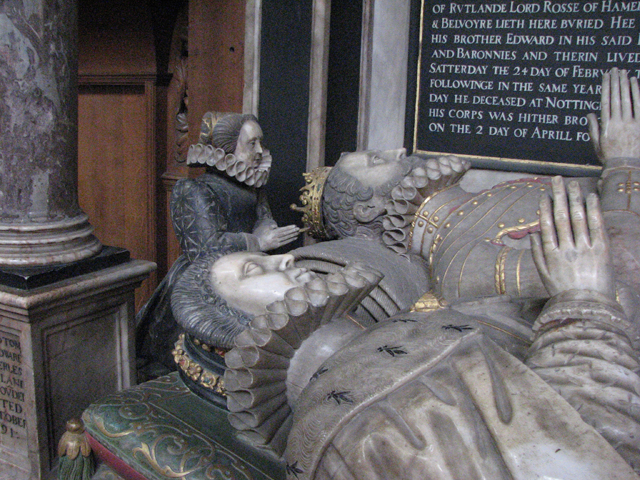
Tomb of the 4th Earl of Rutland, detail of the effigies of the earl and his wife with a daughter kneeling at the head.

Johnson's clientele included several important patrons, such as the earls of Rutland, the earls of Southampton, and Sir John Gage, the Tudor politician, in 1595.

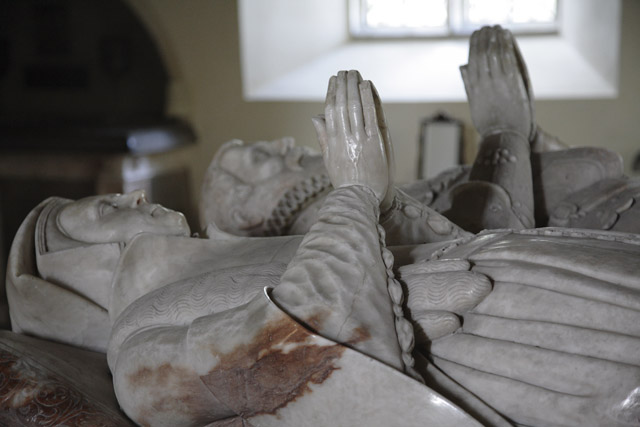
Tomb of Sir John Gage and his wife Philippa in Church of St Michael Firle

In 1591, Johnson was commissioned, ostensibly by Roger Manners, 5th Earl of Rutland, but in practicality his mother, to erect two monuments in St Mary the Virgin's Church at Bottesford, Leicestershire, commemorating the 3rd and 4th earls, Edward and John Manners. The surviving financial papers paint a detailed picture of how such commissions were negotiated and carried out. Johnson received £200 plus expenses for the complete job. The monuments were made in the Southwark yard, carried by ship to Boston, Lincolnshire, and from there transported on 15 carts to Bottesford. Johnson and his son Nicholas stayed in Bottesford to supervise the assembly of the monuments from late September, using local carpenters and masons to alter the church floor and walls to accommodate the structures. He was paid off in November. John Matthews, a painter from Nottingham, was paid £20 in installments from February through November 1592 for "inricheinge" the two tombs.

== Nicholas Johnson ==
His son Nicholas (died 1624) was co-executor of his father's estate and worked with him on the Southampton memorial at Titchfield. He collaborated with other tombmakers on major commissions: with Nicholas Stone the elder in 1615 on the tomb of Thomas Sutton at the Charterhouse School and in 1618–19 with William Cure the younger on the tomb of Bishop Montague in Bath Abbey. In 1618-19 he built the third tomb at Bottesford for the Rutlands commemorating Roger Manners, the fifth earl, and his wife. He died in 1624 and was buried on 16 November at St Saviour's, Southwark.
