= Ailesbury Mausoleum =

Historic site in Bedfordshire, England

Coordinates: 52.0310°N 0.4589°W

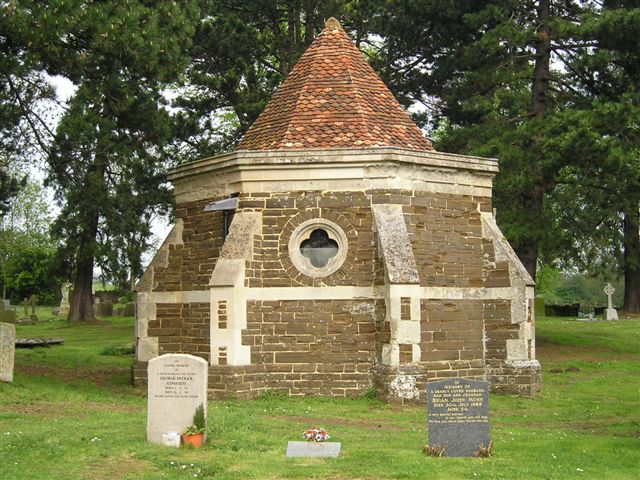
The Ailesbury Mausoleum, Maulden Churchyard, Bedfordshire, built in 1656 and "Gothicised" in 1859

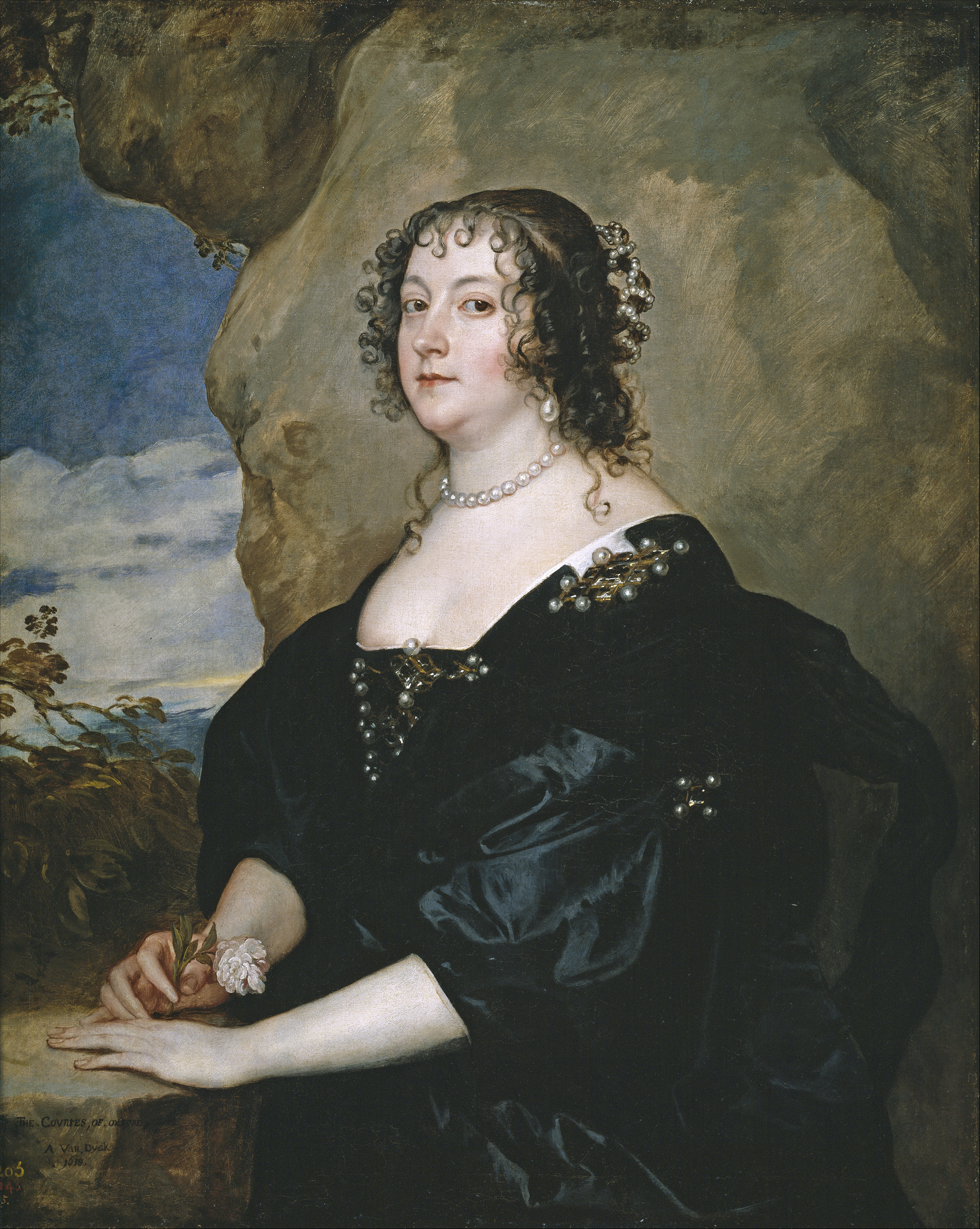
Lady Diana Cecil (d.1654) (Countess of Elgin, 2nd wife of Thomas Bruce, 1st Earl of Elgin (1599–1663)), in memory of whom the Ailesbury Mausoleum was built by her husband in 1656. Portrait by van Dyck

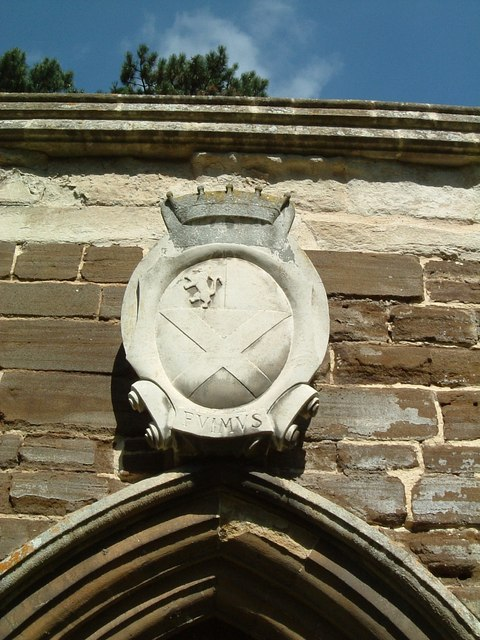
Left: Cartouche above entrance to the Ailesbury Mausoleum displaying the arms of Bruce (right): Or, a saltire and chief gules on a canton argent a lion rampant azure, with Latin motto below: fuimus, "we have been"

The Ailesbury Mausoleum situated in the churchyard of St Mary's Church, Maulden, in Bedfordshire, is a Grade II listed structure built in 1656 by Thomas Bruce, 1st Earl of Elgin (1599–1663) (father by his 1st wife of Robert Bruce, 2nd Earl of Elgin, 1st Earl of Ailesbury (1626-1685)), of nearby Houghton House in the parish of Maulden, for the purpose of housing the coffin and "splendid monument" of his second wife, Lady Diana Cecil (d. 1654), a daughter of William Cecil, 2nd Earl of Exeter and widow of Henry de Vere, 18th Earl of Oxford. In the opinion of the architectural historian Sir Howard Colvin (1991) it is one of the first two free-standing mausoleums ever built in England, together with the Cabell Mausoleum at Buckfastleigh in Devon.

== History ==
It was customary before the use of mausoleums in England for prominent gentry and nobility to be buried within the parish churches of which they owned the advowson, or which served the parish within which was situated the manor of which they were lords and in which was situated their manor house and principal seat. In the early mediaeval era exceptionally wealthy such persons desired to be buried within abbeys or monasteries founded by themselves or their ancestors (usually for the express purpose of funding monks or nuns to pray continually for the rapid transition of their souls and those of their ancestors through the uncertain stage of Purgatory and rapidly onwards to eternal rest in Heaven). If sufficiently eminent such persons were buried in a cathedral. Such burials usually were made at the north side of the altar in the chancel, the position of greatest honour, and a most sacred spot, or if already occupied, elsewhere in the chancel or in a dedicated family chapel elsewhere within the church, usually situated at the east end of a new aisle expressly built by the family for that purpose.

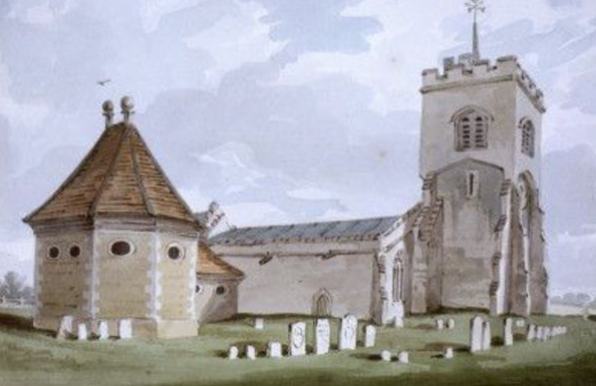
The Ailesbury Mausoleum, early 19th century watercolour, showing the original arrangement before being "Gothicised" in 1859

The advowson of Maulden church was acquired in 1635 by Thomas Bruce, 1st Earl of Elgin, who had been granted the nearby estate of Houghton by King James I (1603-1625), which he made his seat. The advowson remained a possession of his descendants until 1954, long after the family had sold Houghton in 1738, when it was transferred to the Bishop of St. Albans.

The Ailesbury Mausoleum consisted originally of a subterranean crypt with vaulted ceiling with an elongated octagonal shaped room above at ground level. The crypt contained the Countess's coffin whilst the room above displayed her monument, in the form of an oval gadrooned cistern from which rises a half-figure of the Countess, sculpted in white marble (attributed to Thomas Burman), locally known as "the lady in the punchbowl". The room was lit by oval windows and was linked by a short length of covered passage which led into the north side of the Church, in which was situated the manorial pew occupied by the Bruce family and its household servants. This original arrangement is illustrated in an early 19th-century watercolour painting now in the nearby Luton Museum and Art Gallery, which also shows the steeply pitched roof with alternating bands of plain and fish-scale clay tiles, surviving today.

Following the death of the 1st Earl of Elgin in 1663, his son and heir by his first marriage, Robert Bruce, 2nd Earl of Elgin, 1st Earl of Ailesbury (1626-1685), placed a white marble sculpted bust of his father and another of his own son Edward Bruce (who had died the year before in 1662) (both attributed to George Bushnell) in the Mausoleum, each in its own niche set into the wall either side of the Countess's monument, and placed their coffins in the crypt below.

Thomas Bruce, 3rd Earl of Elgin, 2nd Earl of Ailesbury (1656-1741) was a strong supporter of the Stuarts and went into exile overseas in 1696 on account of his loyalty to King James II. He never returned to Houghton and in 1738 sold the house to John Russell, 4th Duke of Bedford. However the family's connection with the Mausoleum was not neglected.

Charles Bruce, 4th Earl of Elgin, 3rd Earl of Ailesbury (died 1747) inherited from his mother Elizabeth Seymour, niece and heiress of John Seymour, 4th Duke of Somerset (1629–1675), the estates of the Seymour family in Savernake Forest, Wiltshire, and in 1721 rebuilt Tottenham Lodge in the parish of Great Bedwyn, Wiltshire, to the design of his brother-in-law the pioneering Palladian architect Lord Burlington. He thus moved from Houghton House to Tottenham, but retained a close connection with the Mausoleum.

In 1746, one year before the death of Charles Bruce, 4th Earl of Elgin, 3rd Earl of Ailesbury, who had no son, it was apparent that on his death the Earldom of Ailesbury would become extinct and that his older Earldom of Elgin would pass to a distant cousin and heir male. He therefore persuaded the king to create him Baron Bruce of Tottenham, with special remainder to his younger nephew Hon. Thomas Brudenell (1739–1814), 4th son of George Brudenell, 3rd Earl of Cardigan (1685–1732) of Deene Park in Northamptonshire, by his wife Elizabeth Bruce, to whom he also bequeathed his estates with the proviso that he should adopt the additional surname of Bruce.

On the death of the 3rd Earl of Ailesbury in 1747 his 8 year old nephew Thomas Brudenell duly became Thomas Brudenell-Bruce, 2nd Baron Bruce of Tottenham (1729-1814), having inherited the barony, the Bruce estates and the Wardenship of Savernake Forest. In 1776 King George III created him Earl of Ailesbury. His son was Charles Brudenell-Bruce, 1st Marquess of Ailesbury (1773–1856).

The coffins in the crypt below had degenerated within this period to such an extent that in 1769 Thomas Brudenell-Bruce, 2nd Baron Bruce (1729-1814), ordered the construction of 27 loculi to re-house them, and also to house the remains of past and future members of his family. A diagram showing the arrangement of the loculi within the vault survives in the Wiltshire and Swindon Record Office. The family continued to use the Mausoleum for interments until 1836, at which date 24 of the loculi were occupied by deceased family members, when another vault at Great Bedwyn in Wiltshire came into use, and to which in 1857 the coffins of Henrietta and Henrietta-Maria, Marchioness of Ailesbury (d.1831) were removed.

In 1859 the passageway was demolished and the exterior of the room was "Gothicised", to the design of Benjamin Ferrey, according to the fashion then prevalent. This included the building of external buttresses and the blocking-up of the oval windows.

In the 1970s the Brudenell-Bruce family removed the valuable marble sculptures from the Mausoleum and placed them in their residence at Deene Park in Northamptonshire. In 2001 ownership of the Mausoleum was transferred to Bedfordshire County Council. It has recently been restored with substantial funding from the Heritage Lottery Fund, from EB Bedfordshire Ltd (Landfill Tax) and with small donations from other sources. Replicas of the marble busts have been installed in the mausoleum.

== Sources ==
- The Mausolea and Monuments Trust, Ailesbury Mausoleum, 2017
