= Thomas Bruce, 1st Earl of Elgin =

Scottish nobleman (1599–1663)

Thomas Bruce
- Earl of Elgin
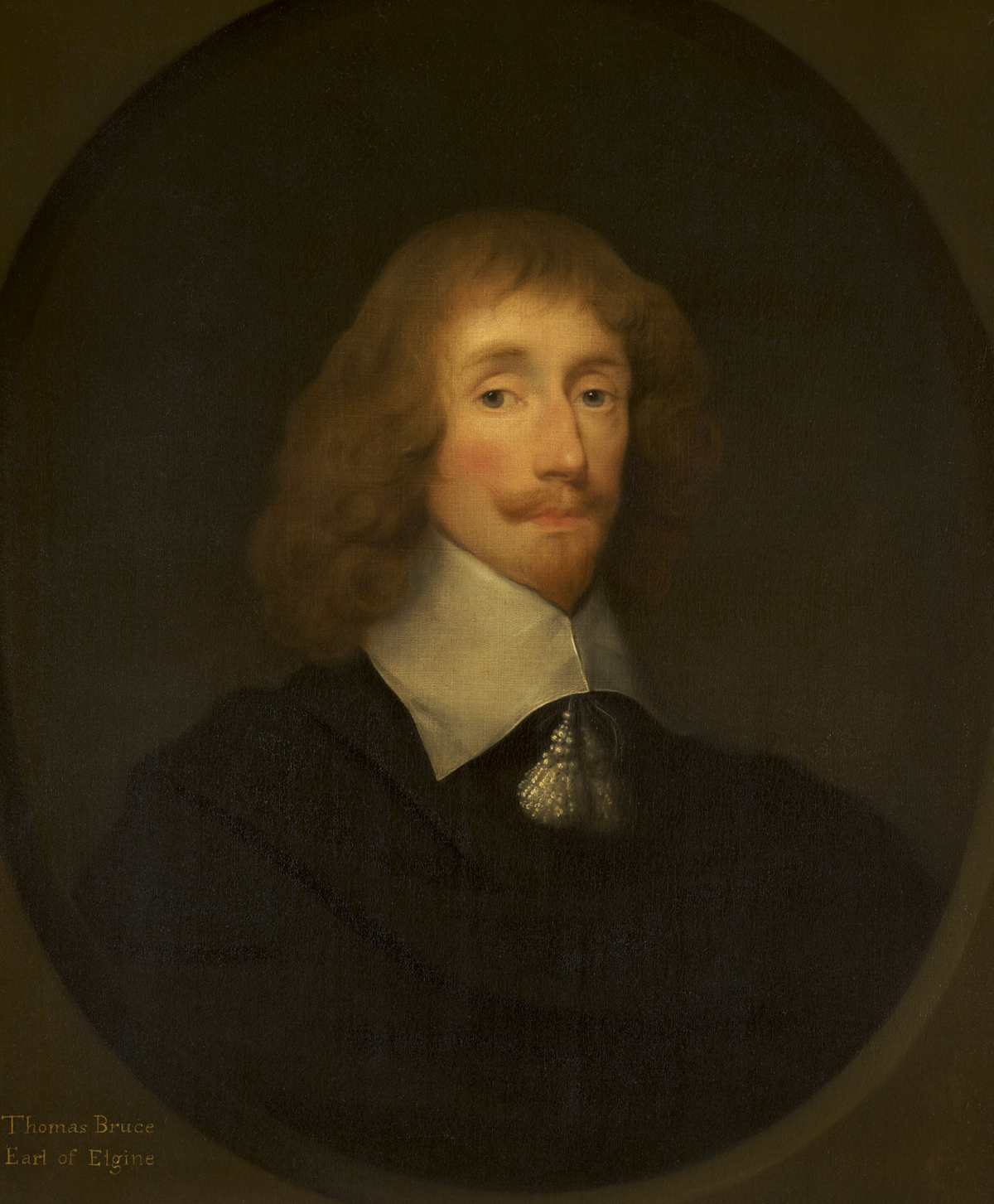
- Portrait by Cornelius Johnson
- Predecessor: Edward Bruce, 2nd Lord Kinloss
- Successor: Robert Bruce, 1st Earl of Ailesbury and 2nd Earl of Elgin
- Other titles: 3rd Lord Kinloss; Baron Bruce of Whorlton
- Born: 2 December 1599; Edinburgh
- Died: 21 December 1663 (aged 64)
- Residence: Houghton House
- Spouses: Anne Chichester; Lady Diana Cecil
- Issue: Robert Bruce, 1st Earl of Ailesbury and 2nd Earl of Elgin
- Parents: Edward Bruce, 1st Lord Kinloss; Magdalene Clerk

Arms of the Earl of Elgin

Thomas Bruce, 1st Earl of Elgin, 3rd Lord Bruce of Kinloss (2 December 1599 – 21 December 1663), of Houghton House in the parish of Maulden in Bedfordshire, was a Scottish nobleman.

== Early life ==
Born in Edinburgh in 1599, Thomas Bruce was the second son of Edward Bruce, 1st Lord Kinloss by his wife Magdalene Clerk. He succeeded to the Scottish peerage title as 3rd Lord Bruce of Kinloss in August 1613, aged 13, on the death of his elder brother, Edward Bruce, 2nd Lord Kinloss, killed in a duel with Edward Sackville, 4th Earl of Dorset. The family estates included Whorlton Castle and manor given to his father by King James I of England in 1603. The King granted the wardship of Thomas and the estates to his mother Magdalene, until he came of age at 21.

In 1614 Viscount Lisle acknowledged Thomas Bruce as a matchmaker in a marriage planned between his son, Robert Sidney, and Elizabeth Cecil. Instead she married Thomas Howard, 1st Earl of Berkshire.

In 1624, King James I granted Houghton House, near Ampthill, Bedfordshire, to Thomas Bruce. The house was built by architects John Thorpe and Inigo Jones in the Jacobean and Classical styles for Mary Herbert, Dowager Countess of Pembroke. It was reverted to the King by Mary's brother two years after the Countess' death in 1621 and became the principal residence for the Bruce family for over a century. King Charles I of England later granted him nearby Houghton Park to preserve game for the royal hunt, but persistent hunting and hawking by the local Conquest family forced the King's subsequent intervention.

== New titles ==
During King Charles I's period of Personal Rule, Thomas Bruce maintained close relations with the court. He attended the King for his coronation in Scotland in 1633 and was created Earl of Elgin on 21 June 1633.

The year after performing in Thomas Carew's masque, Coelum Britannicum, Bruce received the degree of Master of Arts from the University of Oxford in 1636. He was invested as a Knight in 1638 at Windsor, along with William Villiers and Charles, Prince of Wales.

Thomas Bruce continued in royal favour. He was created Baron Bruce of Whorlton, in the Peerage of England, on 29 July 1641. In 1643, he was appointed "Keeper of the King's Park" at Byfleet, a role he held until 1647.

== Civil War ==
Although Bruce's sister Christian Cavendish, Countess of Devonshire was a notable Royalist, Bruce himself took the side of the Parliamentarians, serving on several county committees from 1644 to Pride's Purge.

Shortly before the 1648 outbreak of the Second English Civil War, fellow scot, William Murray, 1st Earl of Dysart, whipping boy of Charles I and husband of his relative, Catherine Bruce, appointed Bruce as principal trustee of Ham House to act on behalf of his wife, Catherine, and their daughters. The move was successful in helping protect Murray's ownership of the estate by making sequestration by the Parliamentarians both more difficult and, given Elgin's influential position with the Scottish Presbyterians, politically undesirable.

Bruce was later described by Sir Philip Warwick as 'a Gentleman of a very good understanding, and of a pious, but timorous and cautious mind'. He recounted how Bruce expressed some uneasy regret for his actions, that he had tried to avoid parliament when he could and denied having been one of the handful of lords that condemned Archbishop Laud to death.

== Marriages and children ==
Thomas Bruce married twice:

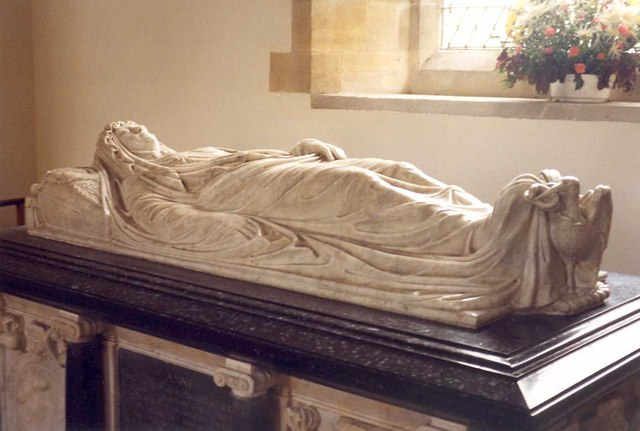
Effigy in the Church of St Peter and St Paul, Exton, Rutland, to Anne Chichester (d.1627) (Countess of Elgin), daughter of Sir Robert Chichester.

- Firstly, on 4 July 1622, he married Anne Chichester (d.1627), a daughter of Sir Robert Chichester of Raleigh (1578–1627), by his first wife, Frances Harington (d. 1615), a daughter of John Harington, 1st Baron Harington of Exton (1540–1613), and a co-heiress of her brother John Harington, 2nd Baron Harington of Exton (1592–1614). Anne was a half-sister of Sir John Chichester, 1st Baronet, of Raleigh (1623–1667). She died on 20 March 1626/27, the day after having given birth to an only child:
  - Robert Bruce, 1st Earl of Ailesbury (1626–1685), only son and heir.

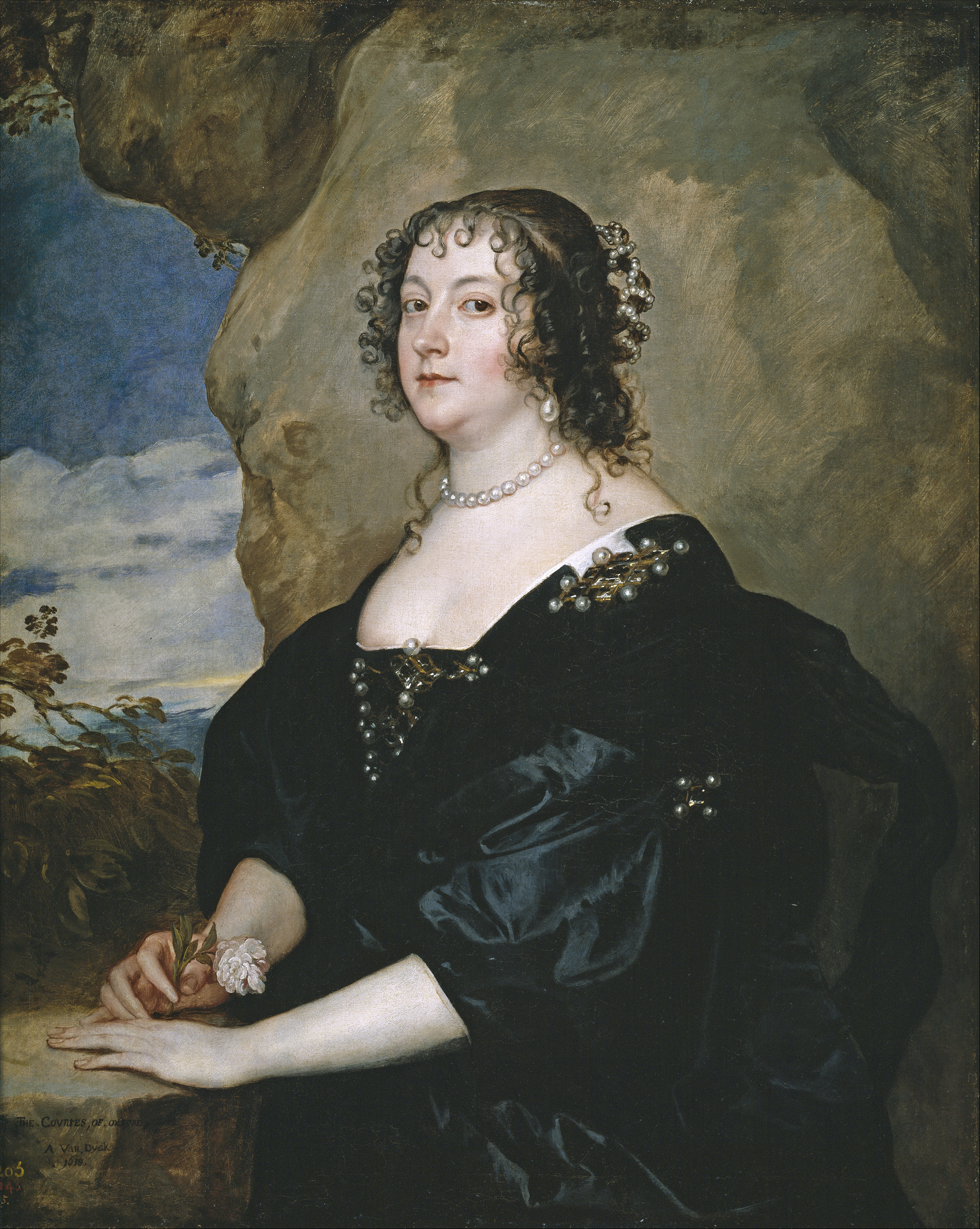
Diana Cecil, 2nd wife of Thomas Bruce and widow of Henry de Vere, 18th Earl of Oxford. Portrait by van Dyck

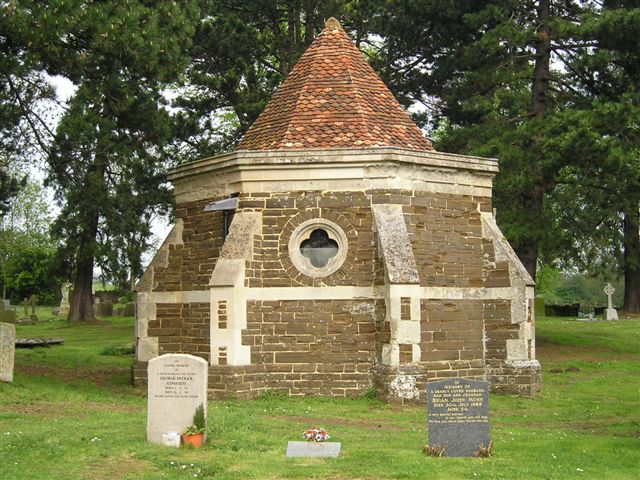
The Ailesbury Mausoleum, Maulden Churchyard, Bedfordshire, built by Thomas Bruce, 1st Earl of Elgin, in memory of his 2nd wife Diana Cecil. One of the earliest free-standing mausoluems built in England

- Secondly, on 12 November 1629, he married Lady Diana Cecil (d.26 February 1658), daughter of William Cecil, 2nd Earl of Exeter by his second wife, Elizabeth Drury, and widow of Henry de Vere, 18th Earl of Oxford. The marriage was childless. Diana had married de Vere in 1624, just a year before his death, and thus brought with her considerable estates at West Tanfield and Manfield, near Bruce's existing Yorkshire estates, as well as property in Lincolnshire and Middlesex, including Clerkenwell Priory. Thomas built in her memory, the Ailesbury Mausoleum, in the churchyard of St. Mary's Church, Maulden, in Bedfordshire, an octagonal building built over an already existing crypt. Inside the Mausoleum survives the monument to Diana, and marble busts of her husband Thomas and of his grandson Edward Bruce. Sir Howard Colvin identified it as one of the first two freestanding mausoleums in England, the other being the Cabell Mausoleum in Buckfastleigh, Devon.

== Death ==
Thomas Bruce died on 21 December 1663 at the age of 64, and was succeeded by his son and heir Robert Bruce, 2nd Earl of Elgin, 1st Earl of Ailesbury.

Peerage of Scotland
New creation	Earl of Elgin; 1633–1663	Succeeded by Robert Bruce
Preceded by Edward Bruce	Lord Kinloss; 1613–1663	Succeeded by Robert Bruce
Preceded by Edward Bruce	Lord Bruce of Kinloss; 1613–1663	Succeeded by Robert Bruce
Peerage of England
New creation	Baron Bruce of Whorlton; 1641–1663	Succeeded by Robert Bruce
