= William Larkin (painter) =

English painter

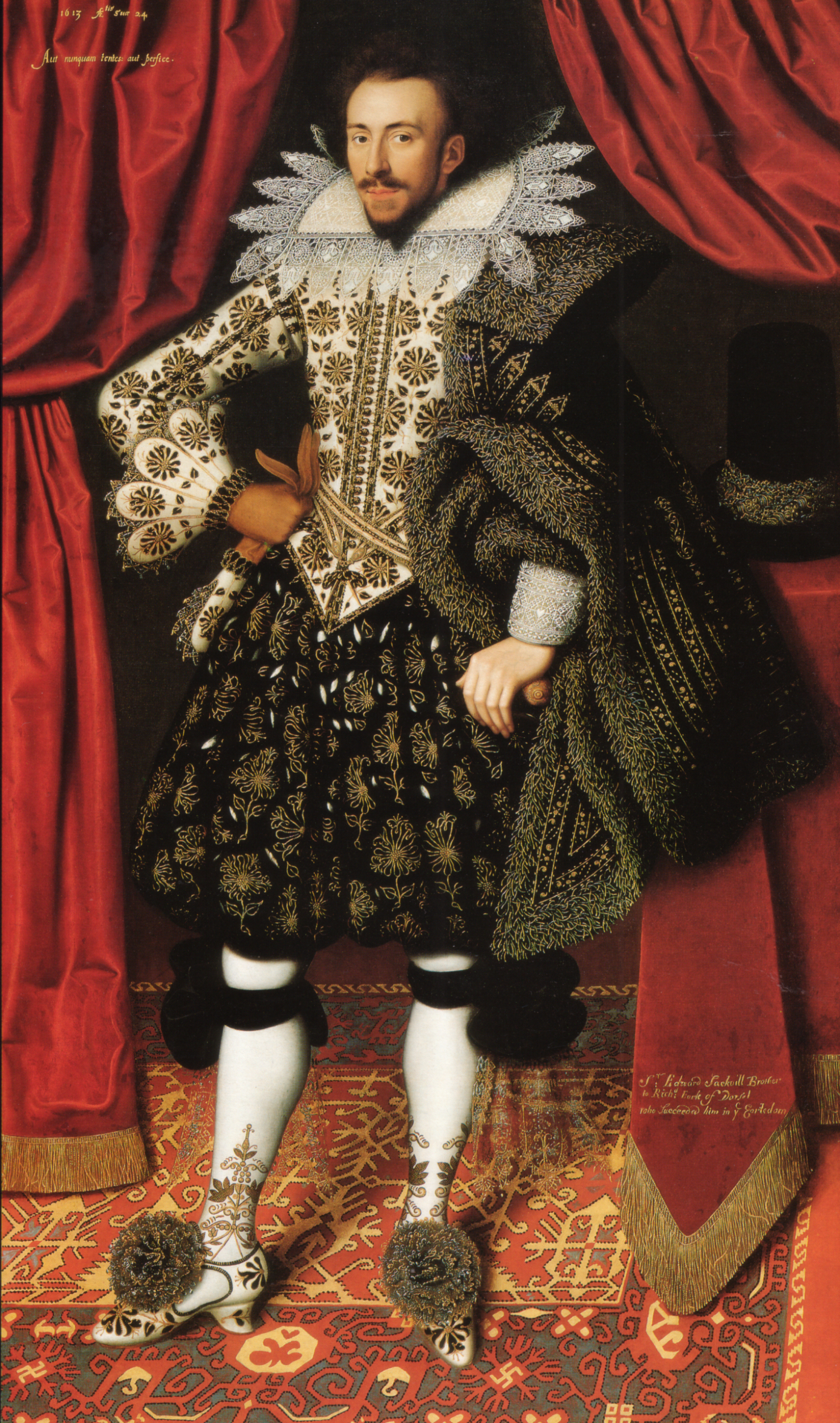
Richard Sackville, 3rd Earl of Dorset by William Larkin, 1613, standing on a Lotto carpet.

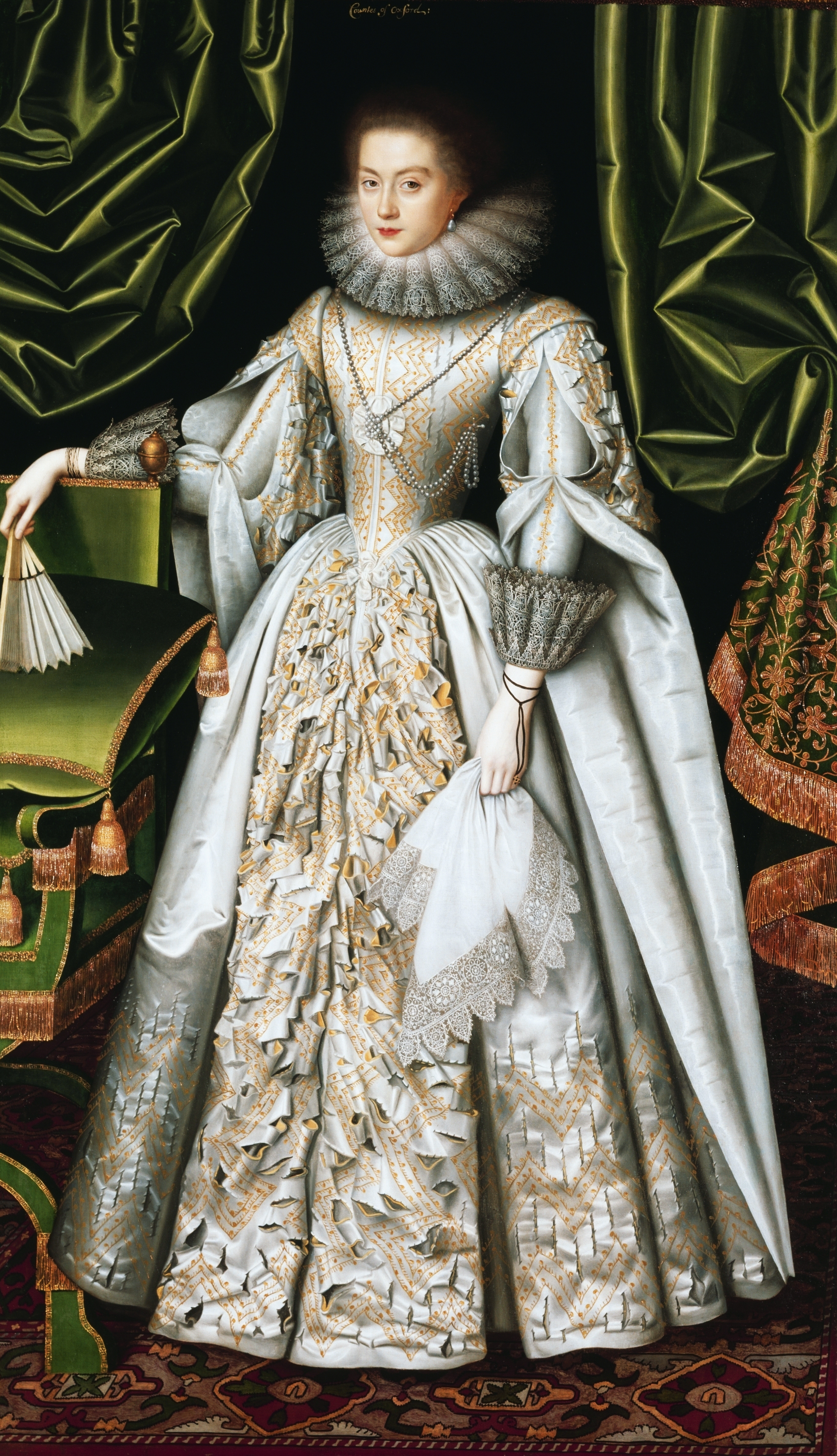
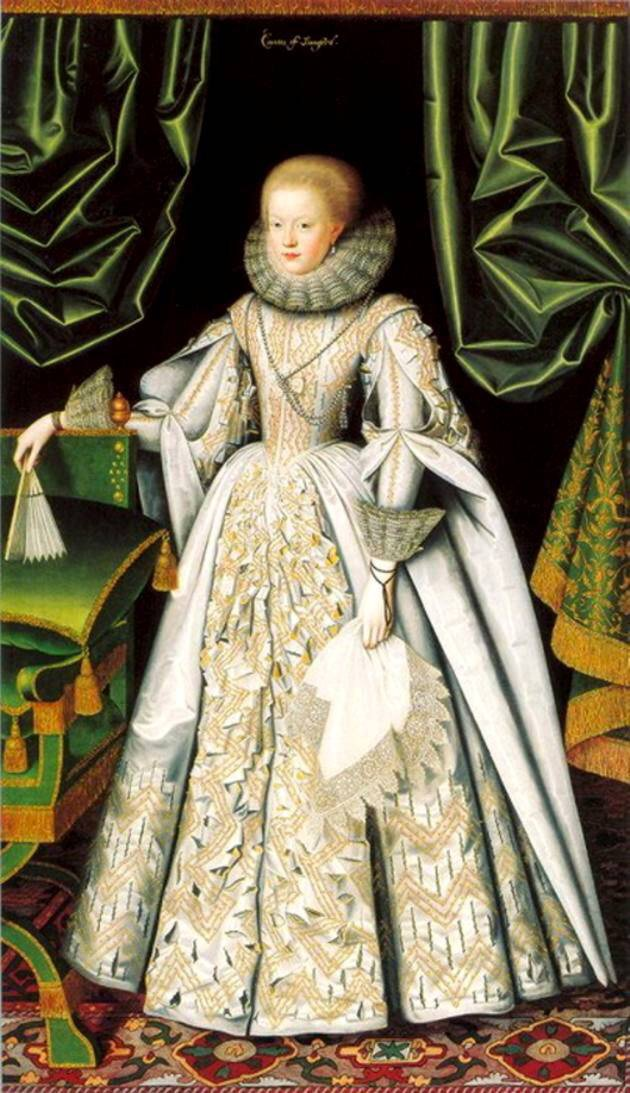
William Cecil's twin daughters Diana and Anne, both paintings by Larkin, 1615)

William Larkin (early 1580s – 1619) was an English painter active from 1609 until his death in 1619, known for his iconic portraits of members of the court of James I of England which capture in brilliant detail the opulent layering of textiles, embroidery, lace, and jewellery characteristic of fashion in the Jacobean era, as well as representing numerous fine examples of oriental carpets in Renaissance painting.

== Life ==
Larkin was born in London in the early 1580s, and lived in the parishes of St Sepulchre-without-Newgate, Holborn, and St Anne Blackfriars. He became a freeman of the Worshipful Company of Painter-Stainers on 7 July 1606 under the patronage of Lady Arbella Stuart and Edward Seymour, 1st Earl of Hertford. Married before 1612, he buried a stillborn son in that year; a son, William, in 1613; and a daughter, Mary, in January 1614/15, all at St Anne Blackfriars. Another daughter called Mary was alive at the time of his death. He died sometime between the witnessing of his will on 10 April 1619 and its proving on 14 May. The date of his burial is unknown because the parish records were destroyed in the Great Fire of London in 1666.

== Works ==
About 40 portraits by Larkin have been identified, of courtiers and gentry, but he seems never to have painted members of the royal family. A series of nine full-length portraits by Larkin formerly owned by the Earls of Suffolk and now known as the Suffolk Collection is housed in Kenwood House, London.

=== Rediscovery ===
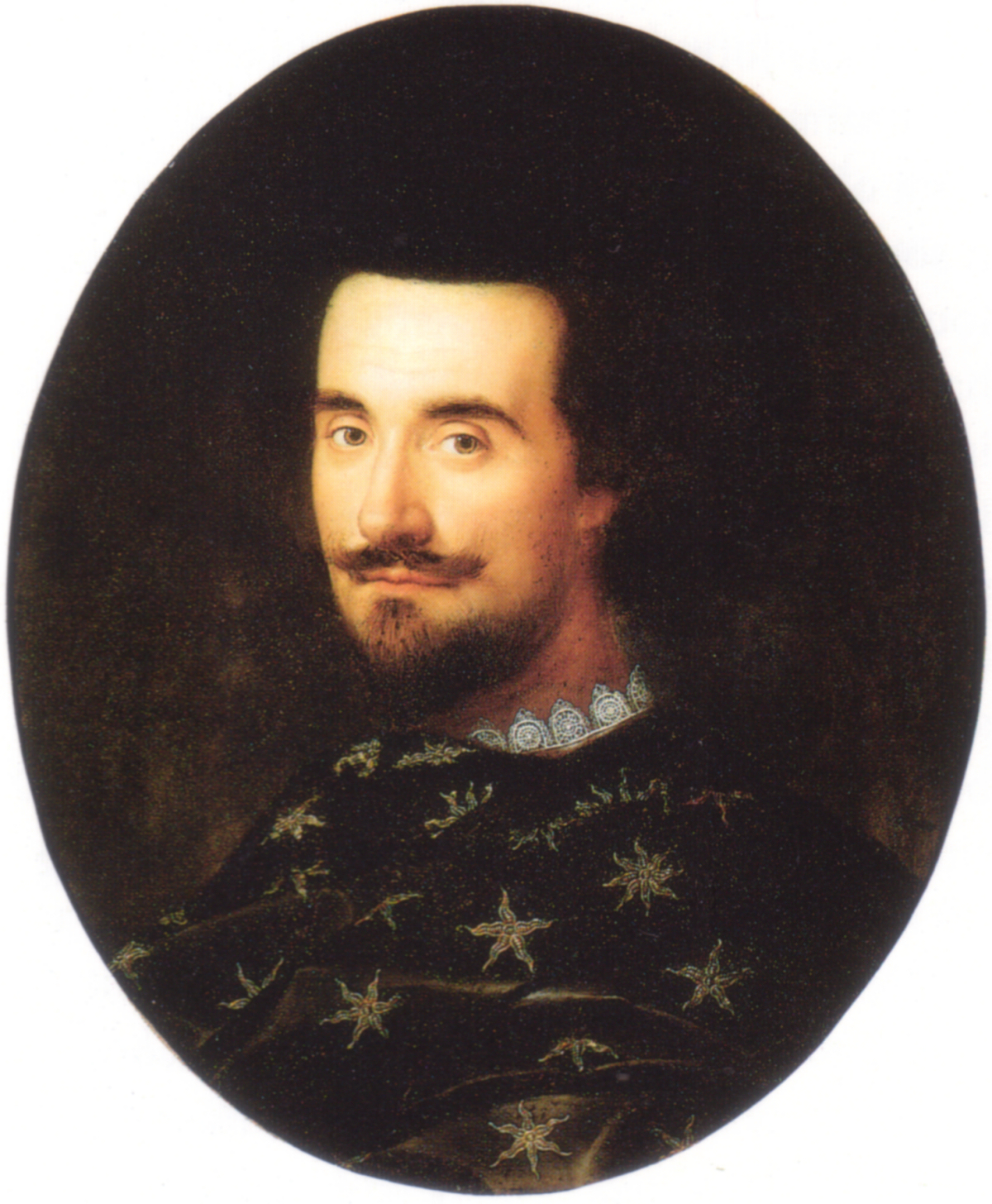
Edward Herbert, 1st Baron Herbert of Cherbury, 1609–10

Although Larkin's role as a portrait painter is recorded in contemporary documents, no surviving works were attributed to him until 1952, when James Lees-Milne identified Larkin as the painter of two portraits in oil on copper at Charlecote Park of Lord Herbert of Cherbury and Sir Thomas Lucy III which had formerly been assumed to be the work of Isaac Oliver. The identification was based on a reference in Herbert's autobiography to a portrait of himself ordered by Richard Sackville, 3rd Earl of Dorset, a "Coppy of a Picture which one Larkin a Painter drew for mee, the Originall whereof I intended ... for Sir Thomas Lucy," Cleaning revealed portions of inscriptions that Lees-Milne suggested showed that the oval portraits had been cut down from rectangular originals.

Other documentary evidence of Larkin's work is found in the Diary of Dorset's wife, Lady Anne Clifford, who sat for Larkin in 1619; in the Rutland Papers for 1617 and 1619; and in a seventeenth-century inventory of paintings at Claydon House including a portrait of Frances Carr, Countess of Somerset.

=== The "Curtain Master" ===
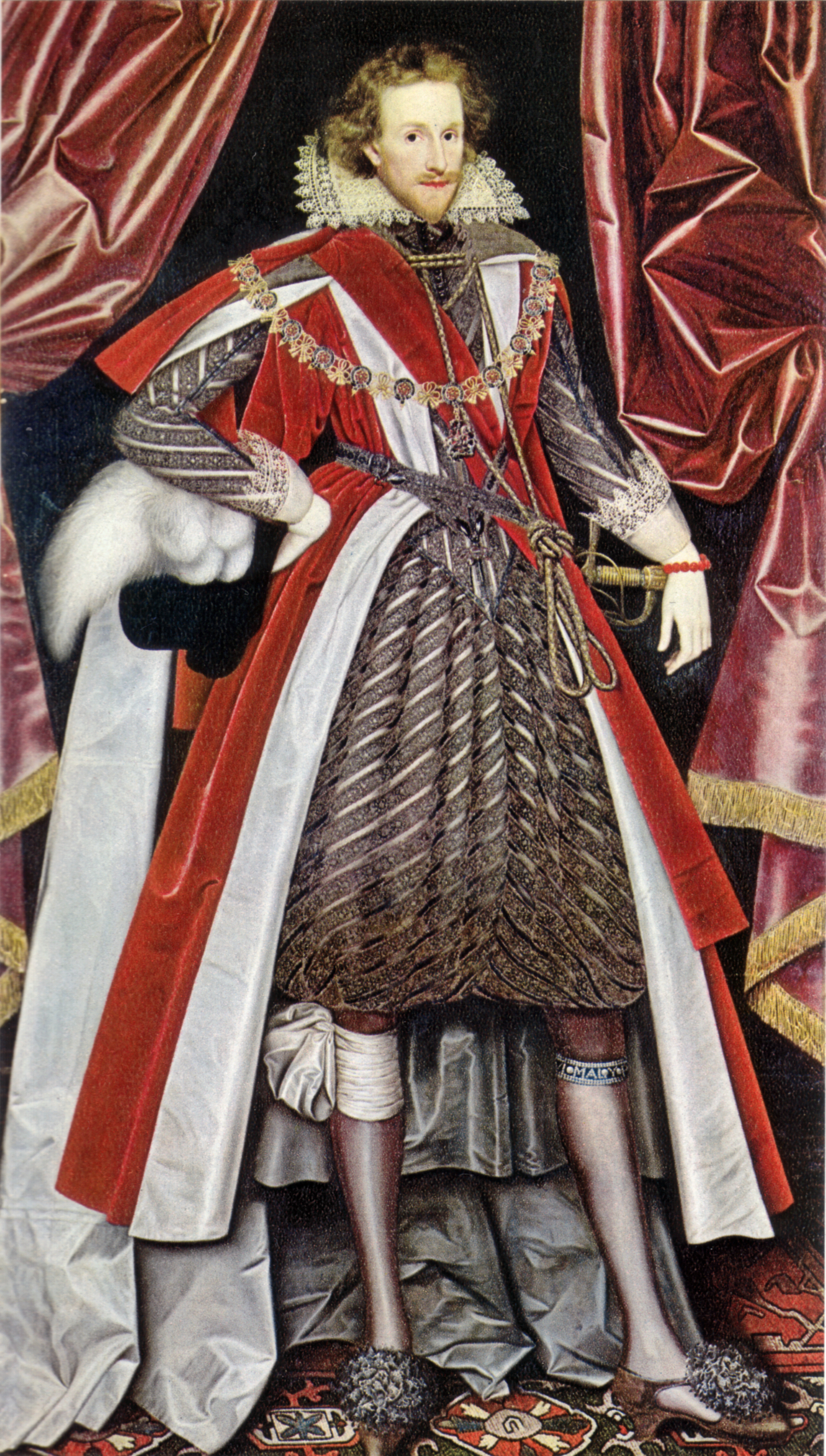
Philip Herbert, 4th Earl of Pembroke, c. 1615

In 1969, art historian Roy Strong identified Larkin with the artist formerly known as the "Curtain Master" based on Larkin's patronage by the Earl of Dorset. The works of the Curtain Master are characterized by identically draped, silk-fringed curtains framing the sitter, rendered in various colours, and one of several carpets on the floor. The attribution to Larkin is supported by later technical analysis comparing these portraits to the documented portrait of Lord Herbert at Charlecote Park, although various hands are identified in the backgrounds of the full-length portraits, indicating that Larkin employed assistants in his workshop or studio to paint these repetitive details, a common practice at the time.

=== Critical assessment ===
Larkin's work marks the last stage in a tradition of English portraiture traceable from the later work of Hans Holbein the Younger through Nicholas Hilliard in which the sitter is painted in flat, lightly modelled fashion, surrounded by meticulously rendered wardrobe and props, with each detail of lace, embroidery, and gilding carefully delineated. Writing in 1960, Sir David Piper said of the paintings now in the Suffolk collection and their ilk "Artistically, they are a dead end, but they have a strange and fascinating splendour." The deaths of Hilliard, Larkin, and fellow-portraitist Robert Peake the Elder in 1619 mark the end of this insular tradition in British art.

=== Gallery ===
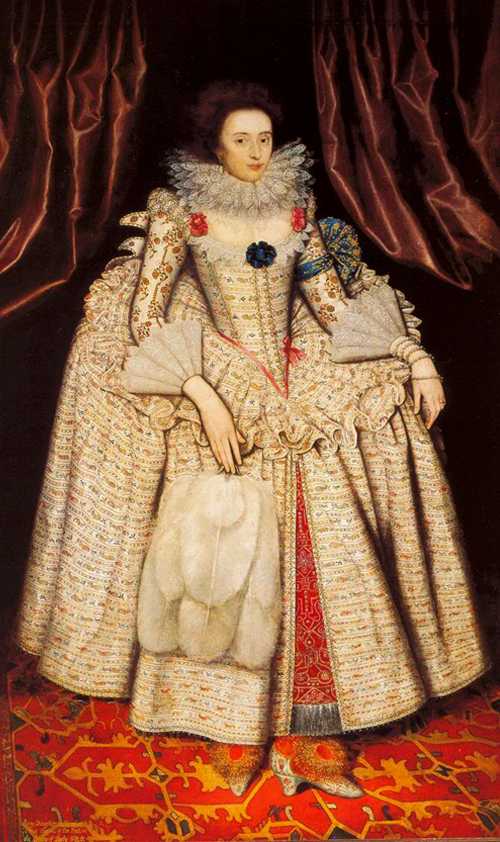
Mary Curzon (1585–1645), Countess of Dorset, daughter and heiress of Sir George Curzon (d.1622) of Croxall, Derbyshire, and wife of Sir Edward Sackville

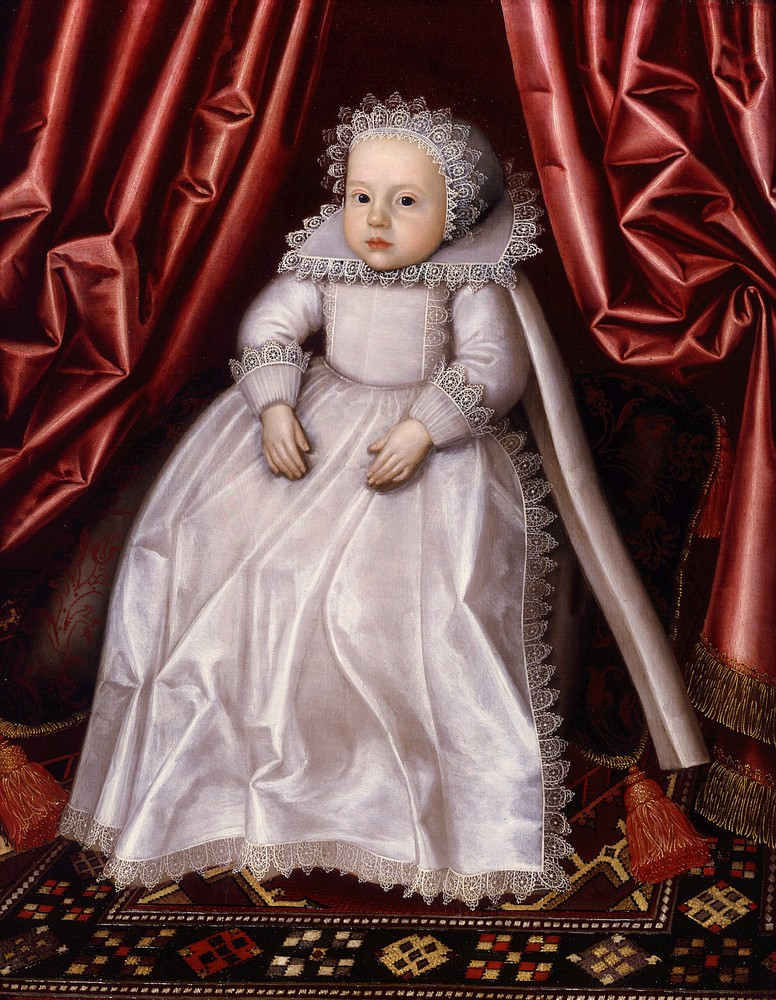
A baby traditionally called Lady Waugh, who has yet to be "shortcoated", ca. 1615

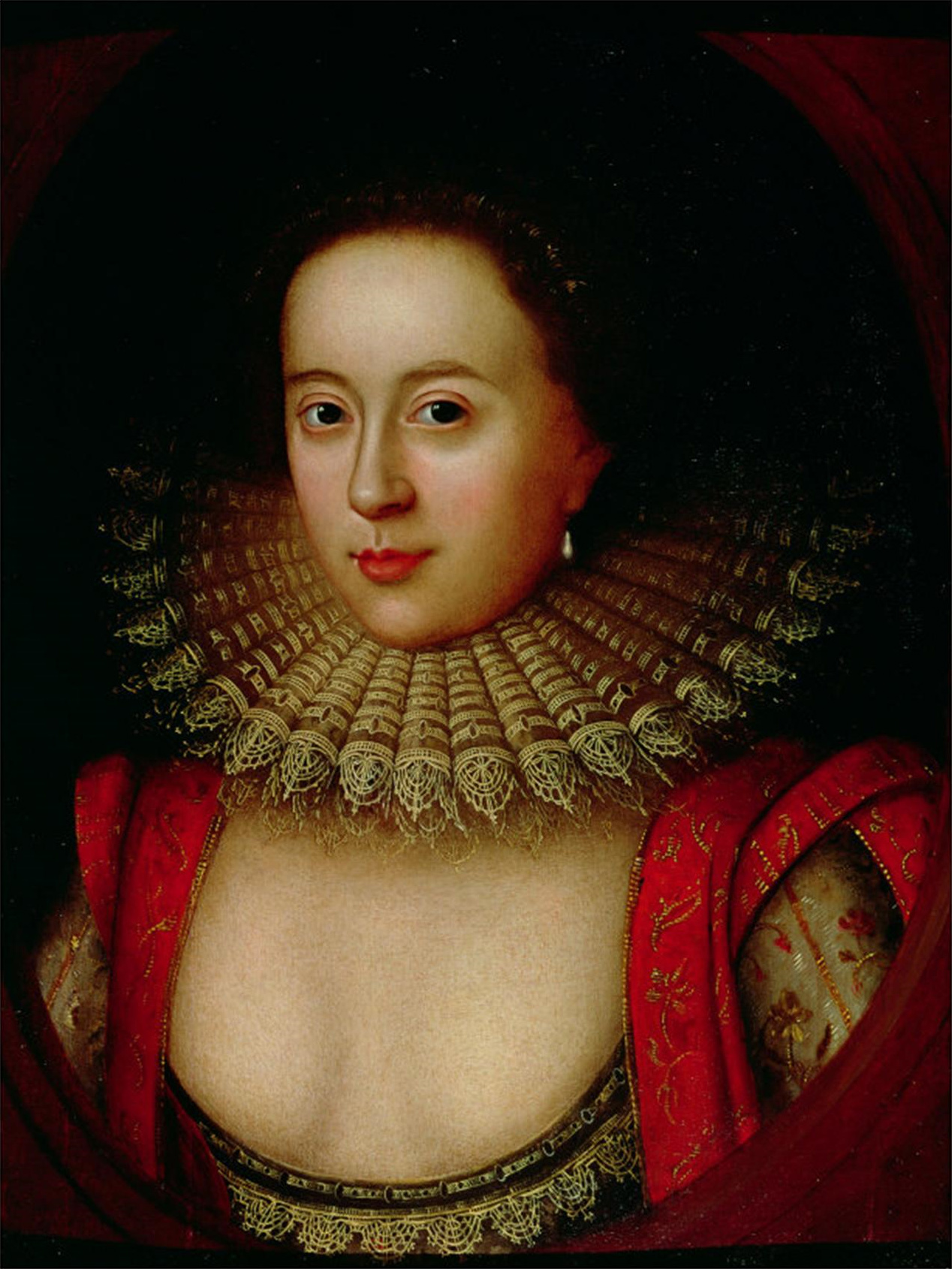
Frances Carr, née Howard, Countess of Somerset, later convicted of the murder of Sir Thomas Overbury in a famous scandal, c. 1615

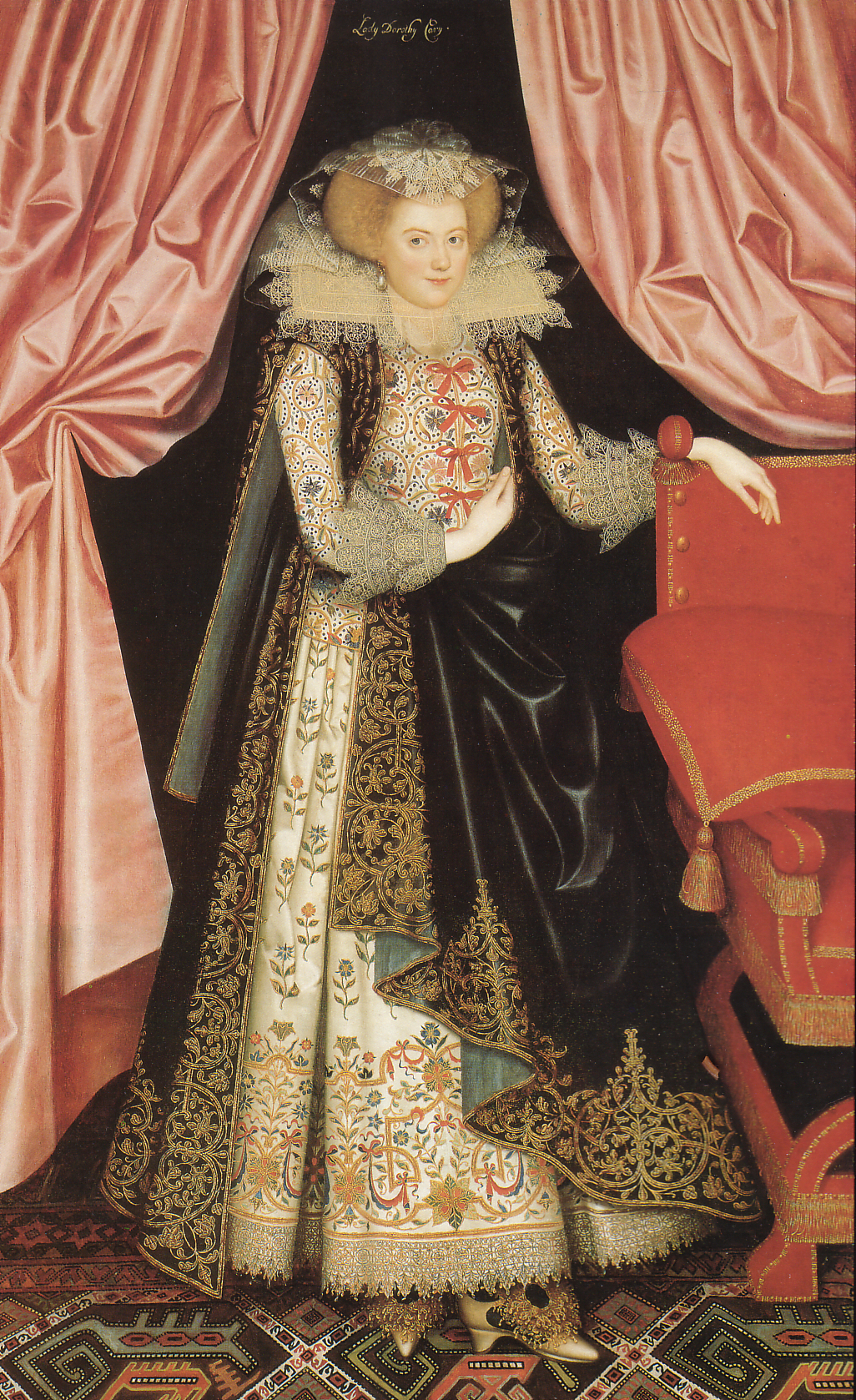
Traditionally called Dorothy Cary, later Viscountess Rochford, c. 1614–1618, but now re-identified as Elizabeth Cary (née Tanfield), Viscountess Falkland

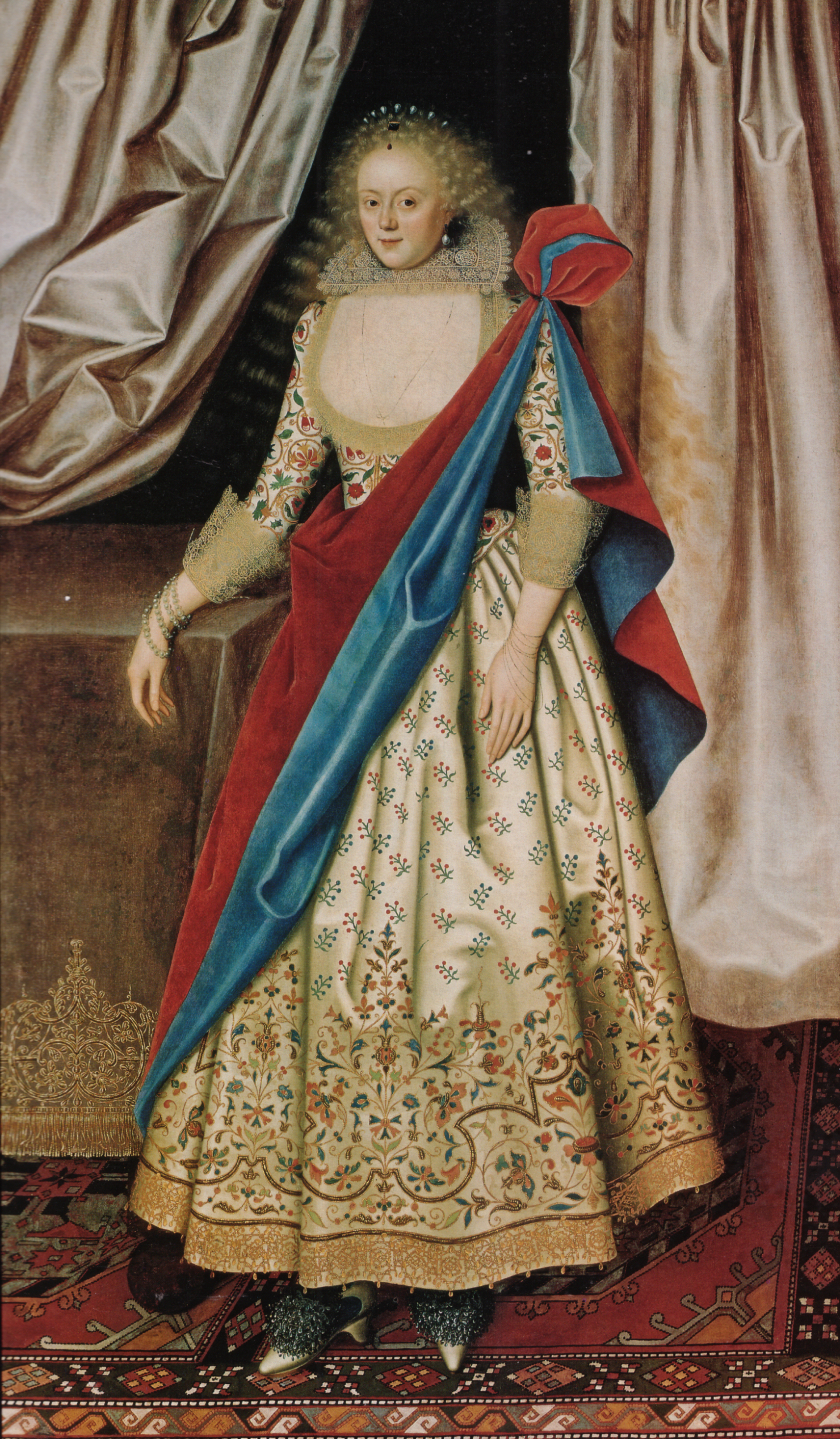
Isabella Rich, Mrs Rogers, 1614–18
