= Houghton House =

Grade I listed building in Bedfordshire, England

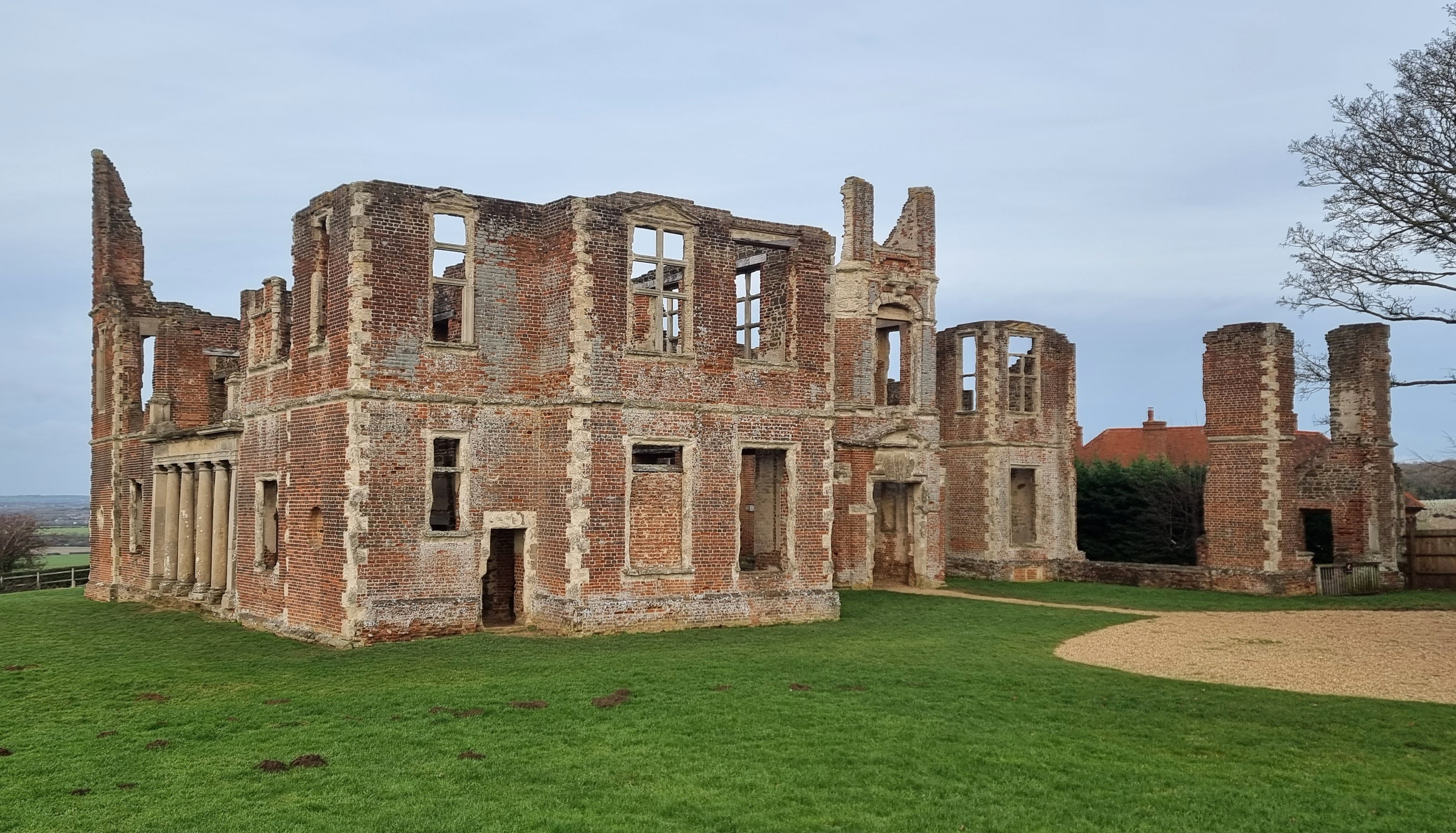
- Houghton House, Bedfordshire, England

- Location within Bedfordshire

General information
- Type: Manor house
- Location: Houghton Conquest, Bedfordshire, England
- Coordinates: 52.044°N 0.48626°W
- Ordnance Survey: TL0392239484
- Construction started: 1615
- Completed: 1621
- Demolished: 1794 (roof and interiors only, natural decay thereafter)
- Client: Mary Sidney
- Owner: English Heritage

Design and construction
- Architects: John Thorpe; Inigo Jones
- Designations: Grade I listed building

Website
- https://www.english-heritage.org.uk/visit/places/houghton-house/

Houghton House is a ruined mansion house in the parish of Houghton Conquest, Bedfordshire. It is a Grade I listed building, positioned above the surrounding countryside, and commands excellent views. Built from 1615 to 1621, it is said that the house was the model for House Beautiful in John Bunyan's The Pilgrim's Progress (1678). It was abandoned in 1794 and stripped (by the owner) of its interiors and roof for sale as building supplies. Today the property is owned by English Heritage, and is open to free public access during daylight hours.

== Descent ==
=== Herbert ===
The estate of Houghton was granted by King James I of England (1603–1625) to Mary Herbert, Dowager Countess of Pembroke (1561–1621), a.k.a. Mary Sidney, a courtier, writer, translator, and literary patron, who commenced the building of the existing house in about 1615. Two architects were very likely responsible for the design, John Thorpe, who worked in the Jacobean tradition, and Inigo Jones, who introduced the Classical style of architecture into England. The Countess of Pembroke was visited there by King James I in 1621, soon after its completion. Shortly afterwards, on 25 September 1621, she died of the smallpox. The surviving Jacobean-style frieze on the western side of the house displays heraldic elements relating to the Sidney family and to the Countess's relations, the Dudley family.

=== Bruce ===
Two years after the death of the Countess of Pembroke, the house reverted to King James I by the Countess' brother, the King then granted the estate to Thomas Bruce, 1st Earl of Elgin (1599–1663) in 1624, which became the main residence of the Bruce family for three generations. King Charles I of England later granted him nearby Houghton Park to preserve game for the royal hunt, but persistent hunting and hawking by the local Conquest family forced the King's subsequent intervention.

In the churchyard of nearby Maulden Church, the advowson of which was owned by the Bruce family, is the Ailesbury Mausoleum, the earliest free-standing mausoleum in England, built in 1656 by Thomas Bruce, 1st Earl of Elgin in memory of his 2nd wife, Lady Diana Cecil. The Bruce family resided in the house until Thomas Bruce, 3rd Earl of Elgin, 2nd Earl of Ailesbury went into exile on the Continent in 1696 on account of his loyalty to the deposed King James II of England (1685-deposed 1688, died 1701).

=== Russell ===
Thomas Bruce, 3rd Earl of Elgin, 2nd Earl of Ailesbury never returned to Houghton and in 1738 sold the house to John Russell, 4th Duke of Bedford, whose principal seat was Woburn Abbey, about seven miles from Houghton. His son and heir apparent, Francis Russell, Marquess of Tavistock (d.1767), lived at Houghton from 1764 until he died in a hunting accident in 1767. Thus the 4th Duke's estates, including Houghton, and titles passed to his grandson, Francis Russell, 5th Duke of Bedford (d.1802), who having let the deerpark to a neighbour found he was unable to let the house without its grounds. Considering the house as a liability, in 1794 he ordered Houghton to be dismantled, and accordingly the furnishings were stripped out and the roof removed to be sold as building materials. The staircase survives in The Swan Hotel in Bedford, roughly 8 miles (13 km) north of Houghton House. The 5th Duke never married and thus did not produce a legitimate male heir. He died in 1802 by which time the house, by then long open to the elements, was already in decay.

=== 21st century ===
The ruins were acquired by English Heritage, and is open to free public access during daylight hours. Conservation work was undertaken in 2006 to help maintain safety and improve the understanding of the site and new visitor information boards were installed. By 2007 several of these had been vandalised leaving empty boards behind, but these have since been restored.

== Gallery ==
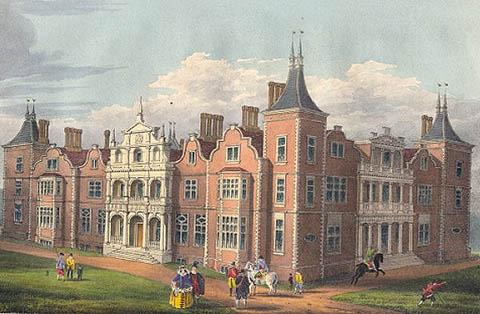
Houghton House by the Rev I. D. Parry published 1827

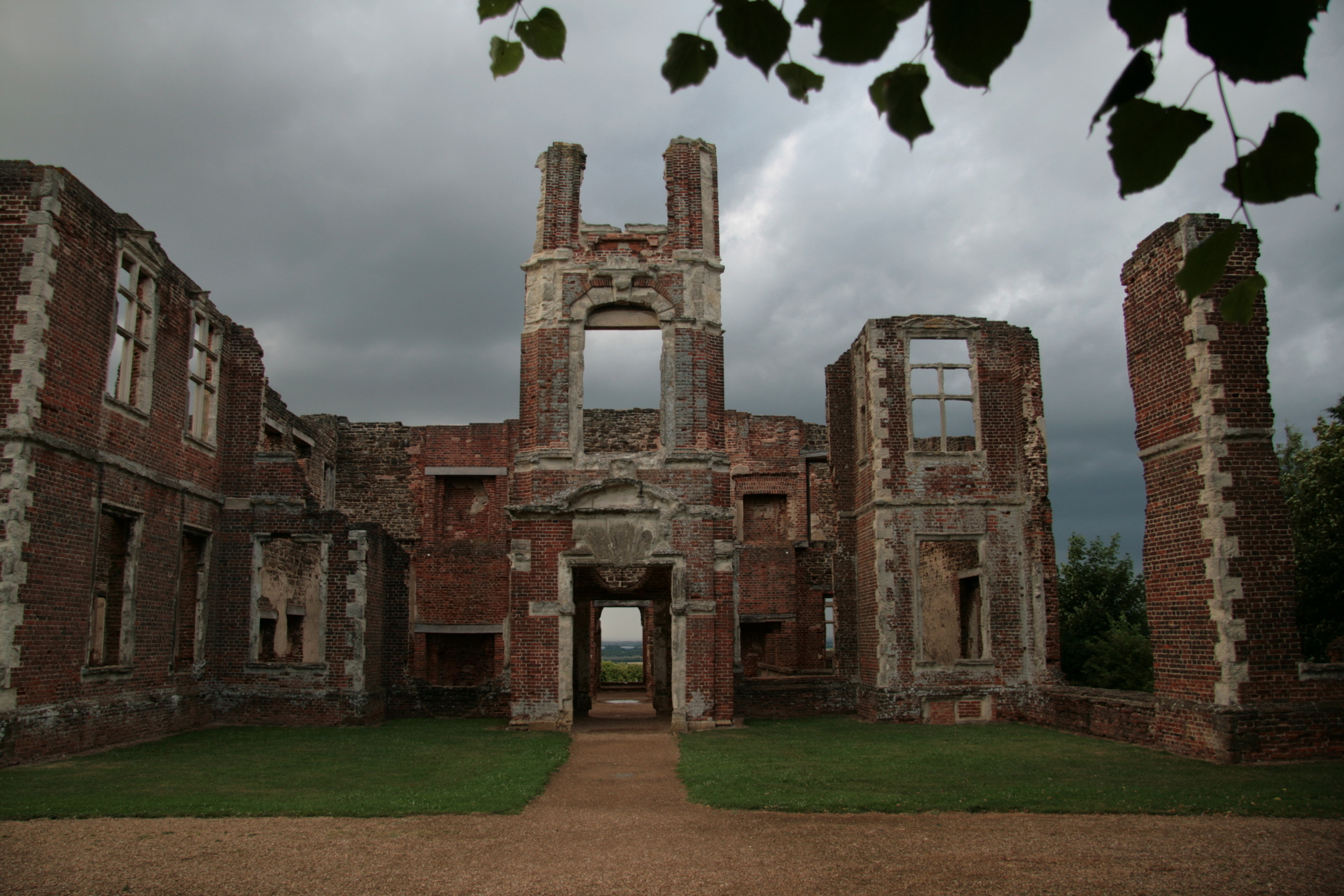
Main entrance

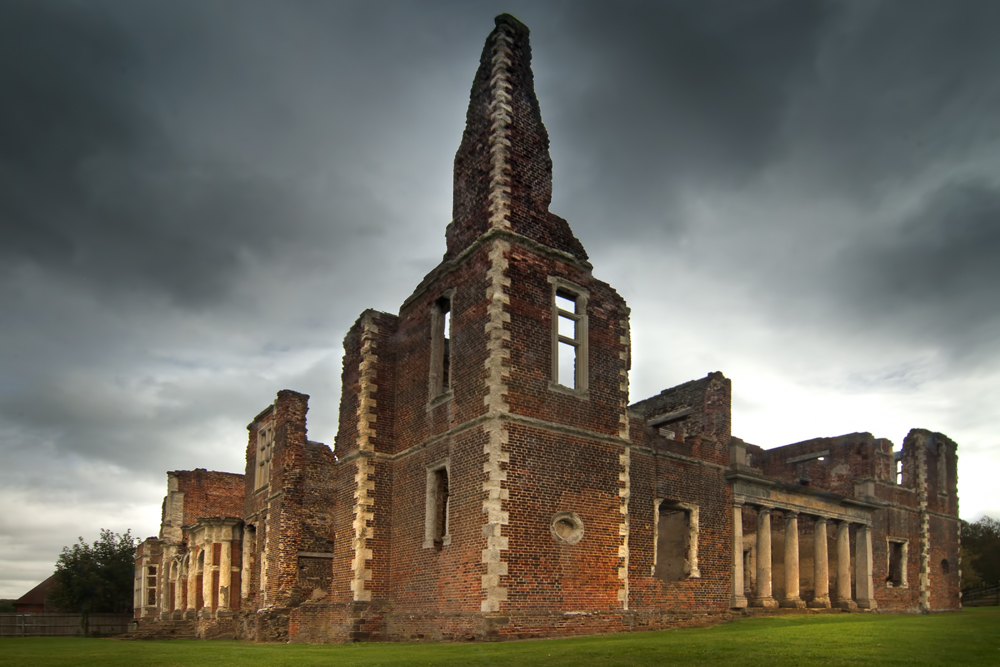
North and west facades

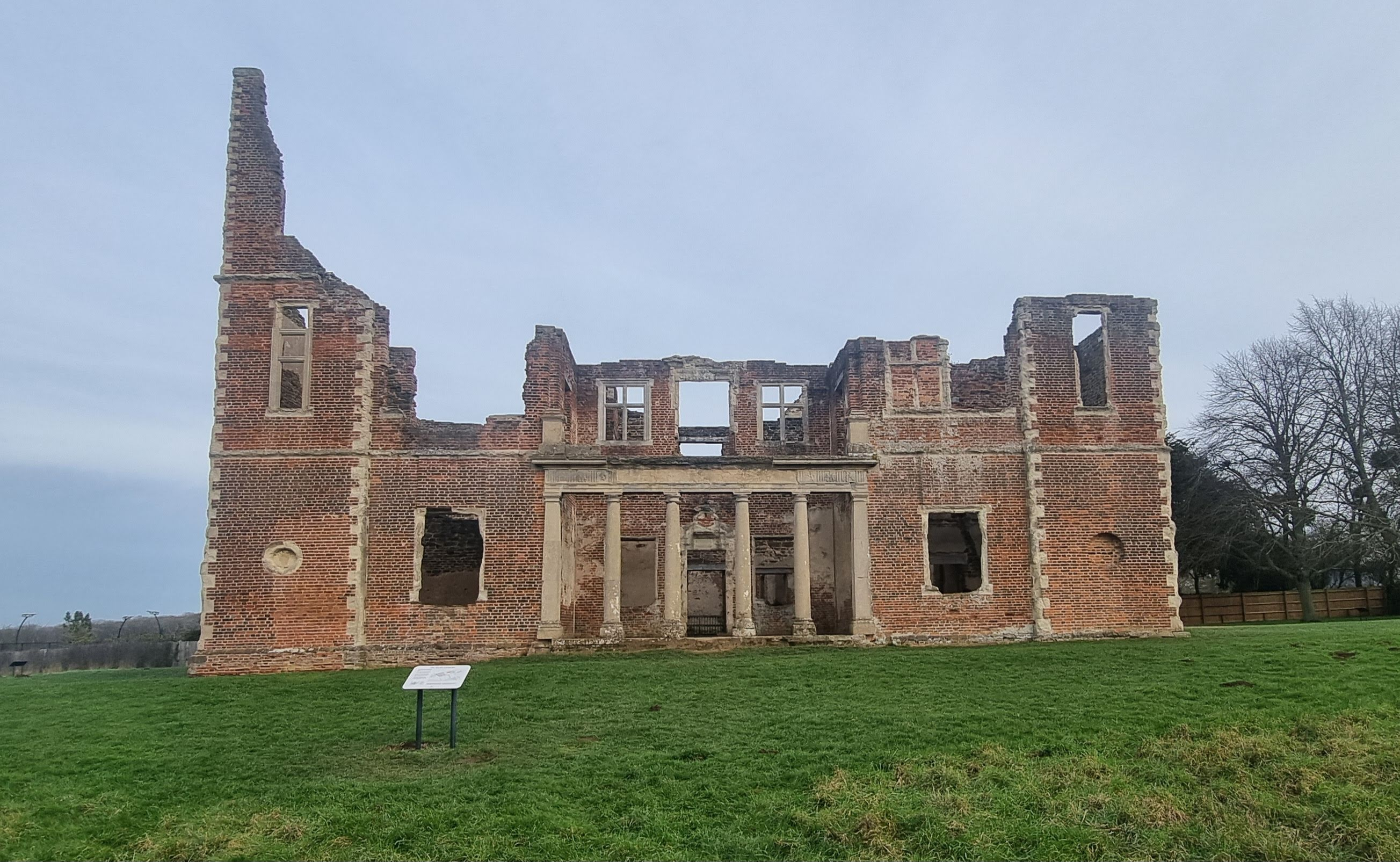
Houghton House, north facade
