= Robert Bruce, 1st Earl of Ailesbury =

Scottish politician

Robert Bruce
- Earl of Ailesbury
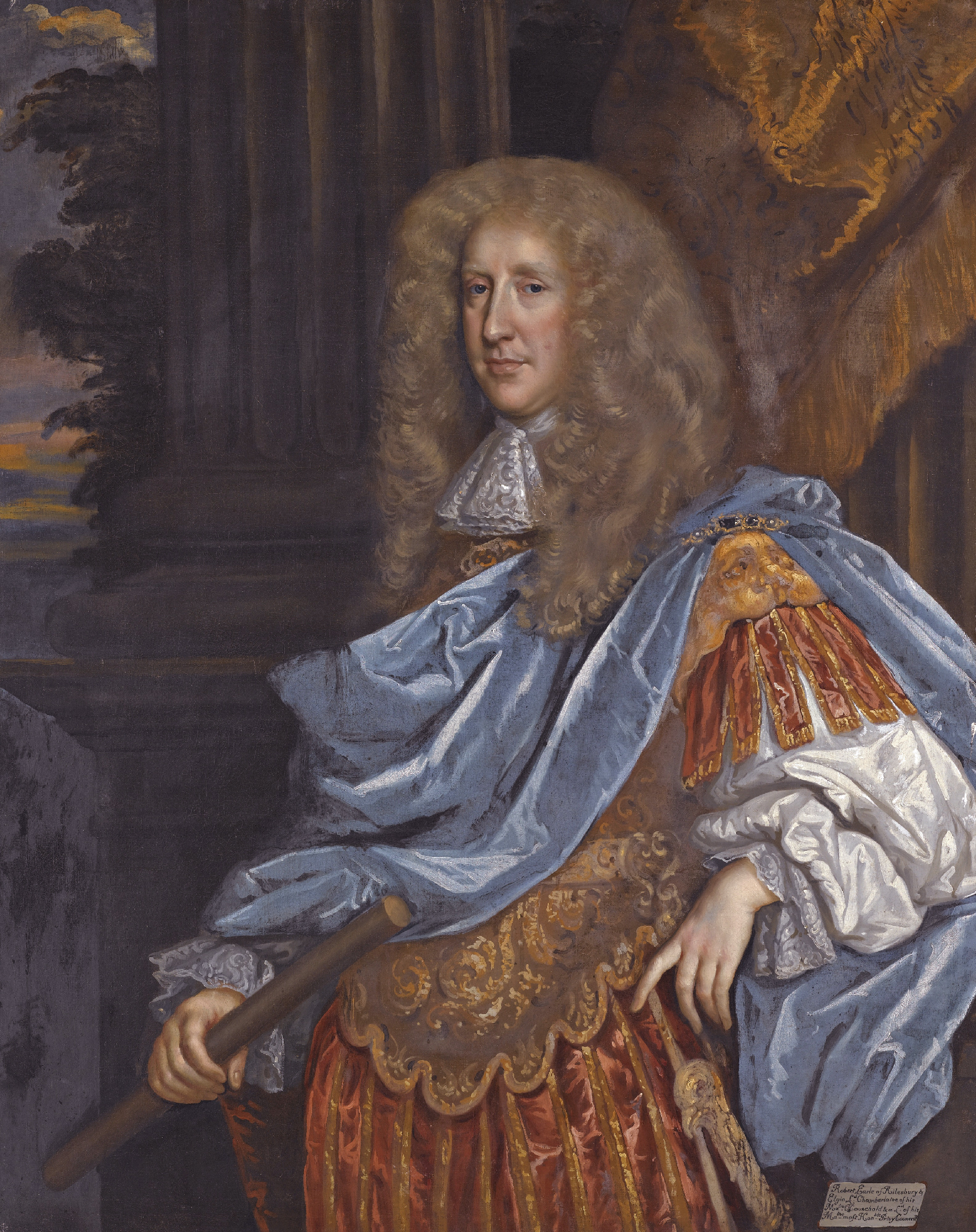
- Portrait by Henri Gascar
- Tenure: 18 March 1664 – 20 October 1685
- Predecessor: Thomas Bruce, 1st Earl of Elgin
- Successor: Thomas Bruce, 2nd Earl of Ailesbury
- Other titles: 2nd Earl of Elgin; Viscount Bruce of Ampthill; Baron Bruce of Skelton
- Born: ca. March 1626
- Died: 20 October 1685; Houghton House, Bedfordshire,
- Residence: Houghton House
- Spouse: Lady Diana Grey
- Issue: Hon. Edward Bruce; Thomas Bruce, 2nd Earl of Ailesbury; Diana Bruce, Lady Roos; Mary Bruce, Lady Walter; Christiana Bruce, Lady Rolle; Anne Bruce, Lady Rich; Hon. Robert Bruce (d. 1652); Hon. Charles Bruce; Hon. Bernard Bruce; Anne Charlotte Bruce, Lady Bagenel; Henrietta Bruce-Ogle; Hon. Robert Bruce (d. 1728); Hon. James Bruce
- Parents: Thomas Bruce, 1st Earl of Elgin; Anne Chichester

Robert Bruce, 1st Earl of Ailesbury (later styled Aylesbury) and 2nd Earl of Elgin, PC, FRS (ca. March 1626 – 20 October 1685), was a Scottish politician who sat in the House of Commons from 1660 to 1663, when he inherited his father's title as Earl of Elgin.

== Life ==
Robert Bruce was the son of Thomas Bruce, 1st Earl of Elgin by his first wife, Anne Chichester. His portrait, as "Lord Kinloss" at the age of 9 was painted by Cornelius Johnson. He went on a Grand Tour in Europe in the years 1642 to 1646.

Coat of arms of the Earl of Elgin

During his father's lifetime, Lord Bruce, as he was styled, was Member of Parliament for Bedfordshire in the Convention Parliament in 1660 and the Cavalier Parliament in 1661, until he succeeded to his father's titles, becoming the 2nd Earl of Elgin in 1663. The following year, he was created Earl of Ailesbury on 18 March 1664, as well as Viscount Bruce of Ampthill and Baron Bruce of Skelton, for his services in procuring the English Restoration. He was Lord Lieutenant of Bedfordshire from 1660 with the Earl of Cleveland, and solely, from 1667 to his death.

In October 1678, Lord Ailesbury was invested as a Privy Counsellor (PC) and a Gentleman of the Bedchamber. He was Lord Lieutenant of Cambridgeshire and Hampshire from 1681 to his death. In 1685, he was invested as a Fellow of the Royal Society and Lord Chamberlain on 30 July 1685.

Robert Bruce died in 1685, aged 58, at Houghton House, just north of Ampthill, Bedfordshire, and was buried on 26 October of that year, at Maulden. His widow, the Dowager Countess of Ailesbury, built Ampthill House nearby in 1686, originally as a dower house. By this time, the Bruce family had extensive estates, among them were: Whorlton Castle, West Tanfield, Manfield, and Clerkenwell Priory.

== Marriage and progeny ==
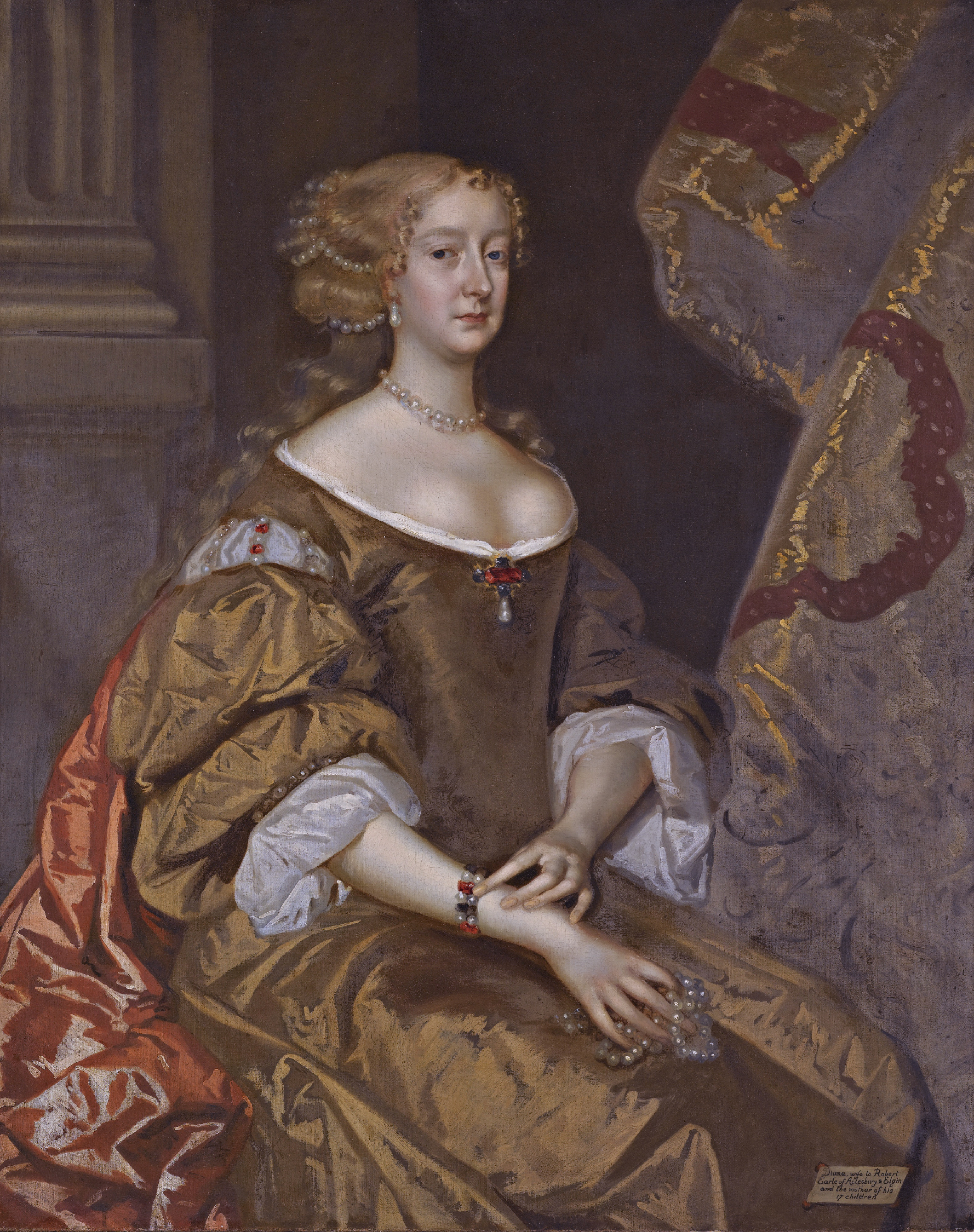
Diana Grey, Countess of Ailesbury, by Henri Gascar

Robert Bruce married Lady Diana Grey, daughter of Henry Grey, 1st Earl of Stamford and Lady Anne Cecil, on 16 February 1645. They had seventeen children, nine of whom seem to have survived to adulthood:

- Hon. Edward Bruce (b. 1644/5, d. 1662)
- Thomas Bruce, 2nd Earl of Ailesbury (b. 1656, d. 16 December 1741)
- Hon. Henry Bruce (b. 1656?, d. young)
- Lady Diana Bruce (d. 15 July 1672), married firstly, Sir Seymour Shirley, 5th Baronet, on 29 January 1666; married secondly, on 10 November 1671, John Manners, Lord Roos, who became Duke of Rutland after her death.
- Lady Mary Bruce (b. 31 December 1657, bur. 15 May 1711), married Sir William Walter, 2nd Baronet.
- Lady Christiana (or Christian) Bruce (b.1658), married firstly, on 4 June 1677 at Ampthill, John Rolle (d.1689), eldest son and heir apparent of Sir John Rolle of Stevenstone, Devon (d.1706), with whom she had two sons, Robert Rolle (c. 1677-18 November 1710) and John Rolle (1679–1730); married secondly, Sir Richard Gayer (or Geyer/Gere) of Stoke Poges, Buckinghamshire.
- Lady Anne Bruce (1st Anne, b. c. 1660, d. before 1717), married Sir William Rich, 2nd Baronet in 1672.
- Hon. Robert Bruce (1st Robert?, d. 1652)
- Hon. Charles Bruce (d. 1661)
- Hon. Bernard (or Barnard) Bruce (b. 1666, d. 1669)
- Lady Arabella Bruce (d. young)
- Lady Anne Charlotte Bruce (2nd Anne, d. 13 March 1713), married Sir Nicholas Bagenal of Newry, a grandson of Henry Bagenal.
- Lady Henrietta Bruce, married Thomas Ogle.
- Hon. Robert Bruce (2nd Robert?, d. 1728)
- Hon. James Bruce (d. 1738)
- Lady Christian Bruce (2nd Christian?, d. young).
- Lady Elizabeth Bruce (d. young).

== Notes ==
Parliament of England
Preceded by Not represented in the restored Rump	Member of Parliament for Bedfordshire; 1660–1663; With: Samuel Browne 1660–1661; Sir Humphrey Winch, 1st Baronet 1661–1663	Succeeded by Sir Humphrey Winch, 1st Baronet; Sir John Napier
Honorary titles
Preceded by The Earl of Bolingbroke	Custos Rotulorum of Bedfordshire jointly with The Earl of Bolingbroke 1671–1681; 1671–1685	Succeeded by The Earl of Ailesbury
Preceded by The Earl of Cleveland	Lord Lieutenant of Bedfordshire jointly with The Earl of Cleveland 1660–1667; 1660–1685	Succeeded by The Earl of Ailesbury
Preceded by The Earl of Manchester	Lord Lieutenant of Huntingdonshire (in the absence of The Earl of Sandwich); 1681–1685	Succeeded by The Earl of Ailesbury
Preceded by The Lord Alington	Lord Lieutenant of Cambridgeshire (in the absence of The Earl of Sandwich); 1685	Vacant Title next held by The Lord Dover
Political offices
Preceded by The Earl of Arlington	Lord Chamberlain; 1685	Succeeded by The Earl of Mulgrave
Peerage of Scotland
Preceded by Thomas Bruce	Earl of Elgin; 1663–1685	Succeeded by Thomas Bruce
Peerage of England
New creation	Earl of Ailesbury; 1664–1685	Succeeded by Thomas Bruce
Preceded by Thomas Bruce	Baron Bruce of Whorlton; 1663–1685	Succeeded by Thomas Bruce
