= Diana Cecil =

English aristocrat (1596–1658)

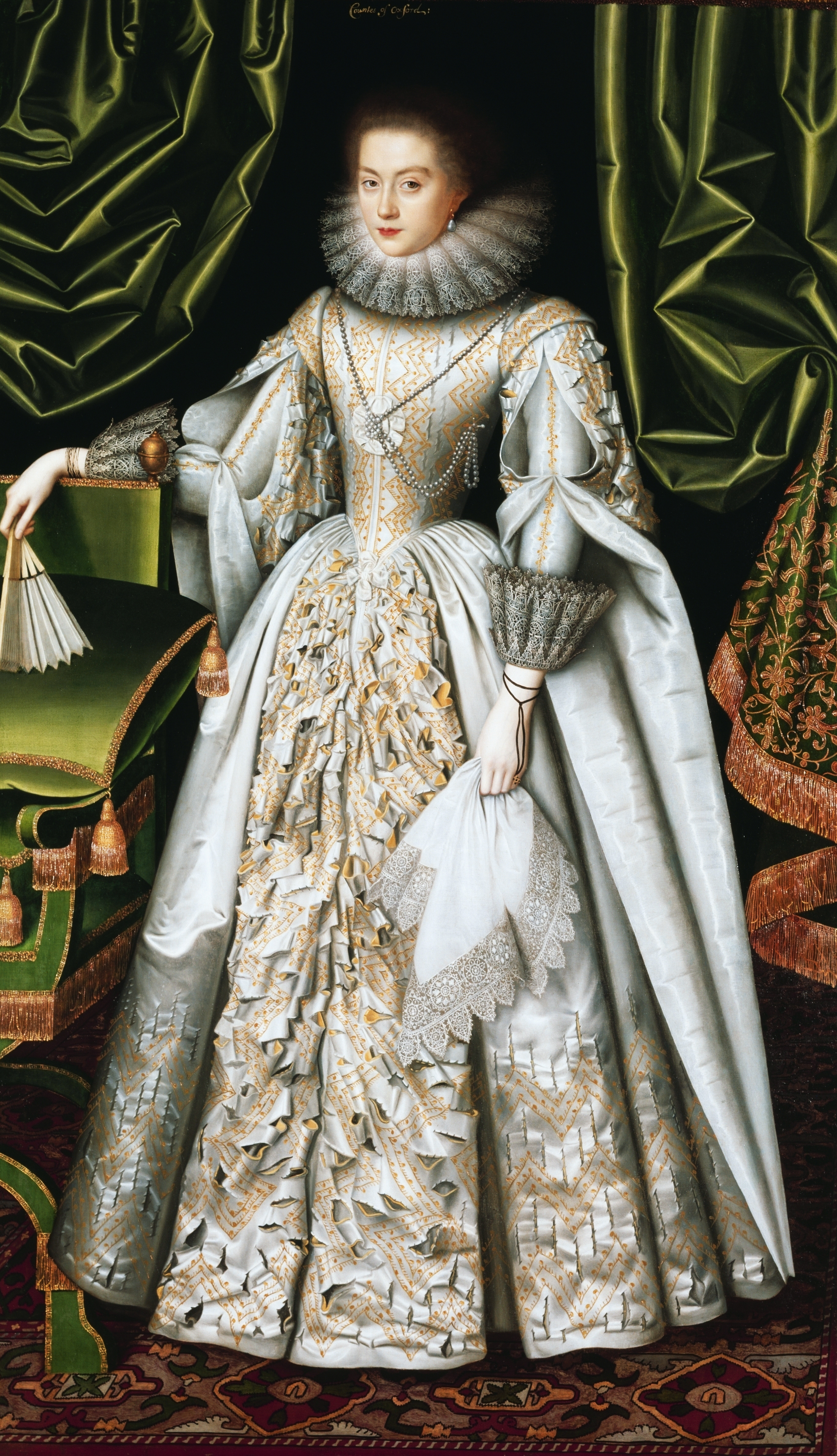
Diana Cecil, by William Larkin circa 1614

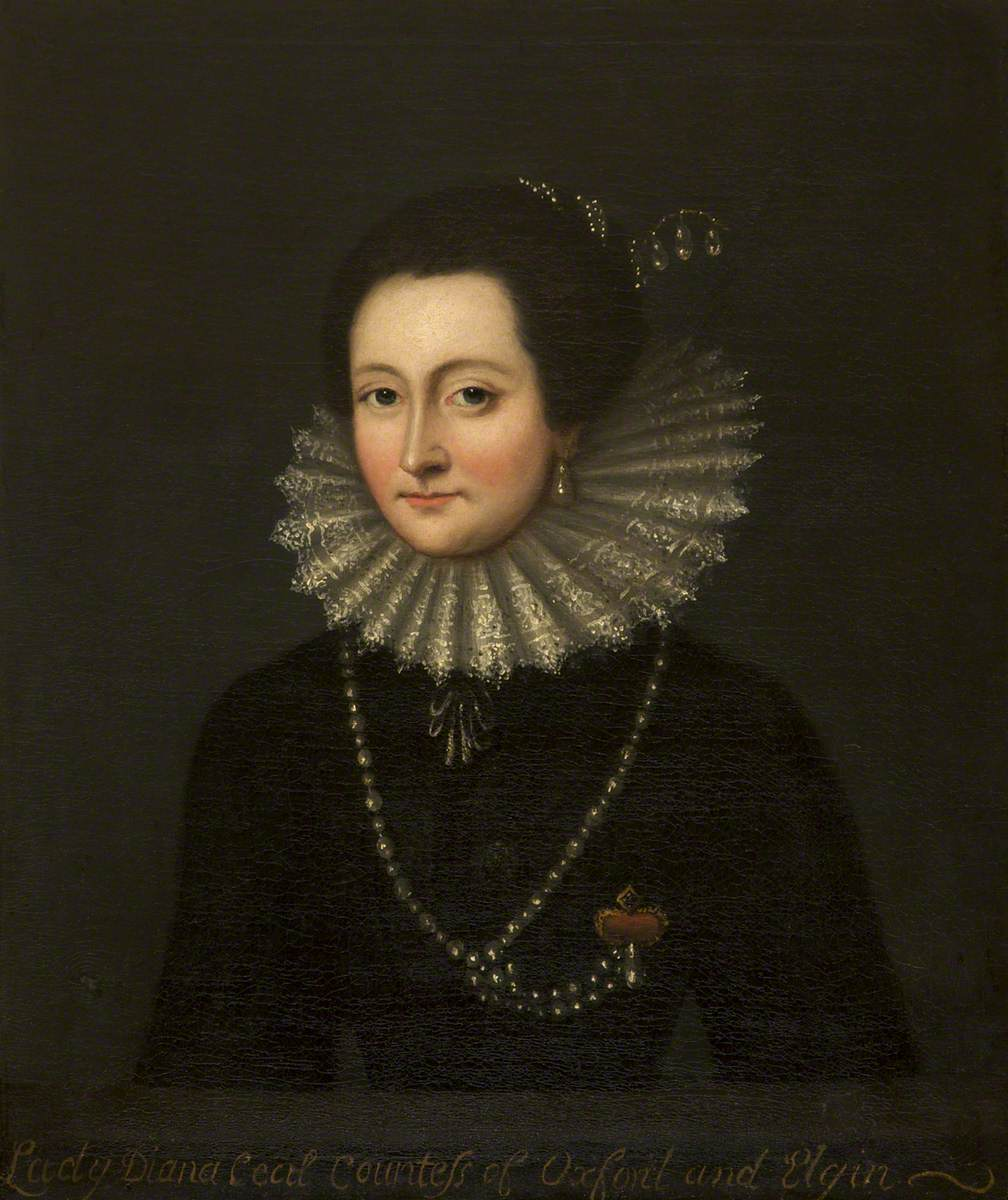
Diana, Countess of Oxford, after Cornelius Johnson, National Trust, Dunham Massey

Diana Cecil, Countess of Oxford (1596–1654) was an English aristocrat. She was a daughter of William Cecil, 2nd Earl of Exeter and his second wife Elizabeth Drury, a daughter of Sir William Drury and Elizabeth Stafford.

Her portrait was painted by William Larkin, by the artist known as the "Comet Master" or Paul van Somer, by Cornelius Johnson, and by Anthony van Dyck.

In 1624 she married Henry de Vere, 18th Earl of Oxford. He died at the siege of Breda in 1625.

In 1629 she married Thomas Bruce, 1st Earl of Elgin.

She died on 26 February 1654.

Thomas Bruce built the Ailesbury Mausoleum in her memory in the churchyard of St. Mary's Church, Maulden, Bedfordshire. The octagonal building was constructed over an existing crypt. Inside the Mausoleum there is a monument to Diana, and marble busts of Thomas Bruce and of his grandson Edward Bruce.
